= 2007 World Women's Handball Championship squads =

List of handball players

The following squads and players competed in the World Women's Handball Championship in 2007 in France.

== Angola ==
1. Maria Tavares
2. Maria Eduardo
3. Ilda Bengue
4. Filomena Trindade
5. Bombo Calandula
6. Carolina Morais
7. Nair Almeida
8. Rosa Amaral
9. Isabel Fernandes
10. Marcelina Kiala
11. Maria Pedro
12. Luisa Kiala
13. Natalia Bernardo
14. Elizabeth Cailo
15. Cristina Branco
16. Cilizia Tavares

Coach: Jeronimo Neto

== Argentina ==
1. Silvina Schlesinger
2. Antonela Mena
3. Cinthya Basile
4. Georgina Constantino
5. Bibiana Ferrea
6. Magdalena Decilio
7. Maria Romero
8. Lucia Haro
9. Maria Acosta
10. Sonia Meyer
11. Silvana Totolo
12. Valentina Kogan
13. Lucia Fernandez
14. Valeria Bianchi
15. Mariana Sanguinetti
16. Marisol Carratu

Coach: Daniel Marcos Zeballos

== Australia ==
1. Megan Miller
2. Olivia Doherty
3. Katia Boyd
4. Lilly Maher
5. Solveig Petersen
6. Raelene Boulton
7. Caitlin Wynne
8. Catherine Kent
9. Kimberly Tennant
10. Rosalie Boyd
11. Allira Hudson-Gofers
12. Joanna Blondell
13. Aminta Thomas
14. Nicole Hughes
15. Sally Potocki
16. Mary Kelly

Coach: Katsuhiko Kinoshita

== Austria ==
1. Natalia Rusnatchenko
2. Tamara Bösch
3. Marina Budecevic
4. Alexandra Materzok
5. Laura Magelinskas
6. Lina Simkunaite
7. Sabrina Thurner
8. Natascha Schilk
9. Beate Scheffknecht
10. Petra Blazek
11. Isabel Plach
12. Katrin Engel
13. Nina Stumvoll
14. Simona Spiridon
15. Katharina Reingruber

Coach: Herbert Müller

== Brazil ==
1. Chana Masson
2. Fabiana Diniz
3. Alexandra Nascimento
4. Fabiana Gripa
5. Deonise Cavaleiro
6. Daniela Piedade
7. Mayara Moura
8. Aline Waleska Rosas
9. Viviane Jacques
10. Juceli Aparecida Rosa
11. Silvia Helena Pinheiro
12. Darly Zoqby
13. Idalina Mesquita
14. Eduarda Amorim
15. Aline Silva
16. Francine Moraes

Coach: Juan Oliver

== China ==
1. Liu Gui Ni
2. Wei Qiu Xiang
3. Liu Yun
4. Liu Jin Lan
5. Shen Ping
6. Yang Liu
7. Wang Min
8. Wang Sha Sha
9. Wang Ru
10. Huang Hong
11. Wu Ya Nan
12. Liu Xiao Mei
13. Wu Wen Juan
14. Huang Dong Jie
15. Shi Xiao Jun
16. Yan Mei Zhu

Coach: Kang Jae Won

== Croatia ==
1. Jelena Grubisic
2. Miranda Tatari
3. Dijana Golubic
4. Vesna Milanovic-Litre
5. Petra Starcek
6. Anita Gace
7. Nikica Pusic
8. Bozica Palcic
9. Ana Krizanac
10. Lidija Horvat
11. Svitlana Pasicnik
12. Andrea Penezic
13. Ivana Jelcic
14. Ivana Lovric
15. Maja Zebic
16. Kristina Franic

Coach: Josip Sojat

== Dominican Republic ==
1. Ofelia Vazquez
2. Crisleidy Hernandez
3. Nargelin Amparo
4. Ingrid Santos
5. Judith Granado
6. Yndiana Mateo
7. Nancy Pena
8. Mariela Andino
9. Miledys Garcia
10. Suleydy Suarez
11. Yacaira Tejeda
12. Elisabeth Mejia
13. Rosa Mambru
14. Rudth de Leon
15. Luisa Pierre
16. Mariela Cespedes

Coach: Felix Romero

== France ==
1. Amandine Leynaud
2. Stéphanie Lambert
3. Nina Kamto Njitam
4. Camille Ayglon
5. Allison Pineau
6. Veronique Pecqueux-Rolland
7. Sophie Herbrecht
8. Stéphanie Cano
9. Isabelle Wendling
10. Myriam Borg
11. Valérie Nicolas
12. Siraba Dembele
13. Delphine Guehl
14. Christine Vanparys-Torres
15. Raphaelle Tervel
16. Maakan Tounkara
17. Katty Piejos
18. Mariama Signate

Coach: Olivier Krumbholz

== Germany ==
1. Sabine Englert
2. Nadine Härdter
3. Ulrike Stange
4. Grit Jurack
5. Ania Rösler
6. Nina Wörz
7. Anne Müller
8. Nora Reiche
9. Anna Loerper
10. Mandy Hering
11. Nadine Krause
12. Kathrin Blacha
13. Susann Müller
14. Clara Woltering
15. Maike Brückmann
16. Maren Baumbach
17. Stefanie Melbeck

Coach: Armin Emrich

== Hungary ==
1. Orsolya Herr
2. Katalin Pálinger
3. Mónika Kovacsicz
4. Beatrix Balogh
5. Ibolya Mehlmann
6. Ágnes Hornyák
7. Rita Borbás
8. Piroska Szamoránsky
9. Anita Görbicz
10. Bernadett Ferling
11. Zita Szucsánszki
12. Zsuzsanna Tomori
13. Tímea Tóth
14. Gabriella Szűcs
15. Orsolya Vérten
16. Erika Kirsner

Coach: András Németh

== Japan ==
1. Sachiko Katsuda
2. Yuko Arihama
3. Mariko Komatsu
4. Mineko Hirai
5. Kaori Onozawa
6. Akiko Kinjo
7. Hitomi Sakugawa
8. Tomoko Sakamoto
9. Shio Fujii
10. Aiko Hayafune
11. Kimiko Hida
12. Keiko Mizuno
13. Noriko Omae
14. Hisayo Taniguchi
15. Kazusa Nagano
16. Akie Uegaki

Coach: Bert Bouwer

== Kazakhstan ==
1. Ruta Pozhemite
2. Tatyana Chumakova
3. Irina Borechko
4. Marina Pikalova
5. Lyazzat Kilibayeva
6. Yelena Kozlova
7. Anastassiya Batuyeva
8. Yelena Portova
9. Olga Yegunova
10. Yekaterina Mishurina
11. Natalya Kulakova
12. Gulzira Iskakova
13. Zhannat Aitenova
14. Natalya Kubrina
15. Natalya Yakovleva
16. Yana Vassilyeva

Coach: Lev Yaniev

== Macedonia ==
1. Olga Kolesnik
2. Robertina Mecevska
3. Natasa Kocevska
4. Anzela Platon
5. Alegra Oholanga Loki
6. Elena Gjorgjievska
7. Daniela Noveska
8. Valentina Radulovic
9. Natasa Mladenovska
10. Natalja Todorovska
11. Julija Portjanko
12. Biljana Crvenkoska
13. Tanja Andrejeva
14. Dragana Pecevska
15. Marina Lambevska
16. Mirjeta Bajramoska

Coach: Ljubomir Savevski

== Norway ==
1. Kari Aalvik Grimsbø
2. Anette Hovind Johansen
3. Katja Nyberg
4. Ragnhild Aamodt
5. Gøril Snorroeggen
6. Else-Marthe Sørlie Lybekk
7. Tonje Nøstvold
8. Karoline Dyhre Breivang
9. Gro Hammerseng
10. Kari Mette Johansen
11. Terese Pedersen
12. Marit Malm Frafjord
13. Katrine Lunde Haraldsen
14. Linn Jørum Sulland
15. Linn Kristin Riegelhuth
16. Vigdis Hårsaker

Coach: Marit Breivik

== Paraguay ==
1. Maria Villalba
2. Fabiana Alvan
3. Nadia Alcaraz
4. Marian Aluan
5. Teresa Fernandez
6. Gladys Brusquetti
7. Giovanna Bettini
8. Beatriz Cristaldo
9. Marizza Faria
10. Giutiana Cristaldo
11. Nilsa Romero
12. Carmen Rios
13. Clara Rivas
14. Aline Chovo
15. Luz Genes
16. Olga Subeldia

Coach: Ruben Subeldia

== Poland ==
1. Aleksandra Jacek
2. Dorota Malczewska
3. Kaja Zaleczna
4. Ewa Damiecka
5. Dagmara Kowalska
6. Malgorzata Majerek
7. Kinga Polenz
8. Iwona Lacz
9. Agnieszka Wolska
10. Karolina Kudlacz
11. Izabela Duda
12. Magdalena Chemicz
13. Katarzyna Duran
14. Kinga Byzdra
15. Malgorzata Sadowska
16. Klaudia Pielesz

Coach: Zenon Lakomy

== Republic of the Congo ==
1. Virginia Yende
2. Jumelle Okoko
3. Nelle Bouangoli
4. Jocelyne Mavoungou Tsahout
5. Didiane Oumba
6. Prisca Ngoli Madzou
7. Leontine Kibamba Nkembo
8. Gisele Donguet
9. Monona Bassarila Ndona
10. Clarisse Leroy Opondzo
11. Chantal Okoye Mbon
12. Amelie Okombi Mouakale
13. Aurelle Itoua Atsono
14. Aubine Menet Ngamabana
15. Carmelia Assiana
16. Fleurine Ngayoulou Ngampika

Coach: Gheorghe Ionescu

== Romania ==
1. Tereza Paslaru
2. Ramona Maier
3. Roxana Gatzel
4. Florina Barsan
5. Raluca Ivan
6. Camelia Balint
7. Adriana Olteanu
8. Cristina Neagu
9. Aurelia Bradeanu
10. Ionela Stanca
11. Clara Vadineanu
12. Talida Tolnai
13. Steluta Luca
14. Luminita Dinu
15. Adina Meirosu
16. Valeria Bese
17. Narcissa Lecusanu

Coach: Gheorghe Tadici

== Russia ==
1. Inna Suslina
2. Polina Vyakhireva
3. Irina Poltoratskaya
4. Oxana Romenskaya
5. Liudmila Postnova
6. Anna Kareeva
7. Ekaterina Andryushina
8. Yana Uskova
9. Elena Polenova
10. Emilyia Turey
11. Natalia Shipilova
12. Maria Sidorova
13. Olga Levina
14. Nadezhda Muravyeva
15. Elena Dmitrieva
16. Irina Bliznova

Coach: Evgeny Trefilov

== Spain ==
1. Tatiana Garmendia Lopez
2. Patricia Pinedo Saenz
3. Beatriz Fernandez Ibanez
4. Maria Berenguel Verdegay
5. Carmen Martin Berenguer
6. Elisabeth Pinedo Saenz
7. Marta Mangue Gonzalez
8. Macarena Aguilar Diaz
9. Aitziber Elejaga Vargas
10. Goretti Castaneda Mora
11. Patricia Alonso Jimenez
12. Isabell Ortuno Torrico
13. Maria Sanchez Bravo
14. Begona Fernandez Molinos
15. Andrea Arias Dasilva
16. Noelia Oncina Moreno

Coach: Jorge Duenas de Galarza

== Tunisia ==
1. Noura Ben Slama
2. Sonia Ghribi
3. Manel Kouki
4. Rym Mannai
5. Amira Fekih Romdhane
6. Sinda Fadhloun
7. Ines Khouildi
8. Hela Msaad
9. Raja Toumi
10. Ines Jaouadi
11. Abir Riyahi
12. Nadia Zekri
13. Rahma Tered
14. Ouided Kilani
15. Haifa Abdelhak
16. Mouna Chebbah

Coach: Bogosav Peric

== South Korea ==
1. Oh Young Ran
2. Woo Sun Hee
3. Kim On A
4. Huh Soon Young
5. Yoo Hyun Ji
6. An Jung Hwa
7. Kim Mam Sun
8. Kim Cha Youn
9. Oh Seong Ok
10. Yong Se Ra
11. Park Chung Hee
12. Lee Sang Eun
13. Lee Min Hee
14. Myoung Bok Hee
15. Choi Im Jeong
16. Moon Pil Hee

Coach: Lim Young Chul

== Ukraine ==
1. Oksana Sakada
2. Mariya Boklashchuk
3. Olena Iatsenko
4. Viktoriya Borshchenko
5. Olena Radchenko
6. Olena Tsyhytsia
7. Iryna Shybanova
8. Olena Reznir
9. Viktoriya Tymoshenkova
10. Yuliya Manaharova
11. Natalya Lyapina
12. Tetiana Vorozhtsova
13. Yuliya Snopova
14. Viktoria Tsybulenko
15. Maria Makarenko
16. Iryna Sheyenko

Coach: Leonid Ratner
