= Handball at the 2006 Asian Games =

2006 Asian Games event

- Venue: Al-Gharafa Indoor Hall
- Date: 3–14 December 2006
- Competitors: 355 from 18 nations

The handball events at the 2006 Asian Games were held in Al-Rayyan, Qatar between 3 December and 14 December 2006. It was the seventh time handball was included at the Asian Games. All matches were held in the Al-Gharafa Indoor Hall.

== Schedule ==
P	Preliminary round	S	Second round	C	Classification	½	Semifinals	F	Finals

Event↓/Date →	3rd Sun	4th Mon	5th Tue	6th Wed	7th Thu	8th Fri	9th Sat	10th Sun	11th Mon	12th Tue	13th Wed	14th Thu
Men	P	P	P	P	S	S	S	C	½	C	C	F
Women				P	P	P	P	P	½	C	F	

== Medalists ==
Event	Gold	Silver	Bronze
Men	Kuwait; Torki Al-Khalidi; Bader Abbas; Abdulaziz Al-Zoabi; Faisal Al-Mutairi; Saleh Al-Jaimaz; Husain Siwan; Fahad Rabie; Abdullah Al-Theyab; Yousef Al-Fadhli; Ali Al-Haddad; Mahdi Al-Qallaf; Meshal Swailem; Hamad Al-Rashidi; Ali Al-Mithin; Saad Al-Azemi; Ali Murad	Qatar; Anas Al-Suweidan; Adnan Al-Ali; Khalid Al-Hashmi; Rashid Al-Remaihi; Samir Hashim; Abdulla Saad Al-Saad; Mohamed Bajawi; Mohammed Walid Ghazal; Ahmed Saad Al-Saad; Mubarak Bilal Al-Ali; Mohsin Yafai; Yousef Ashoor; Fawaz Al-Moadhadi; Khalid Al-Marri; Yousef Al-Maalem; Badi Johar	Iran; Iman Ehsannejad; Mohammad Reza Rajabi; Mohammad Reza Jafarnia; Hani Zamani; Masoud Zohrabi; Saeid Pourghasemi; Mostafa Sadati; Allahkaram Esteki; Farid Alimoradi; Alireza Rabie; Hossein Shahabi; Ali Akbar Khoshnevis; Rasoul Dehghani; Peyman Sadeghi; Hojjat Rahshenas
Women	South Korea; Woo Sun-hee; Yoon Hyun-kyung; Huh Soon-young; Lee Gong-joo; An Jung-hwa; Yu Ji-yeong; Kim Cha-youn; Huh Young-sook; Moon Kyeong-ha; Park Chung-hee; Kwon Geun-hae; Lee Min-hee; Myoung Bok-hee; Kang Ji-hey; Choi Im-jeong; Moon Pil-hee	Kazakhstan; Olga Travnikova; Olga Adzhiderskaya; Marina Buzmakova; Irina Borechko; Marina Pikalova; Alexandra Yefimova; Lyazzat Kilibayeva; Yelena Kozlova; Gulnar Mendybayeva; Yelena Portova; Natalya Kubrina; Anastassiya Batuyeva; Yuliya Goncharova; Yevgeniya Nikolayeva; Natalya Yakovleva; Yana Vassilyeva	Japan; Sachiko Katsuda; Yuko Arihama; Mariko Komatsu; Kaori Onozawa; Akiko Kinjo; Hitomi Sakugawa; Tomoko Sakamoto; Aiko Hayafune; Kimiko Hida; Keiko Mizuno; Noriko Omae; Hisayo Taniguchi; Mami Tanaka; Kazusa Nagano; Eiko Yamada; Akie Uegaki

== Medal table ==
Rank	Nation	Gold	Silver	Bronze	Total
1	Kuwait (KUW)	1	0	0	1
1	South Korea (KOR)	1	0	0	1
3	Kazakhstan (KAZ)	0	1	0	1
3	Qatar (QAT)	0	1	0	1
5	Iran (IRI)	0	0	1	1
5	Japan (JPN)	0	0	1	1
Totals (6 entries)		2	2	2	6

== Draw ==
A draw ceremony was held on 7 September 2006 to determine the groups for the men's and women's competitions. The teams were seeded based on their final ranking at the 2002 Asian Games.

=== Men ===
Group A

- Bahrain (6)
- Qatar (Host)
- India
- Macau

Group B

- Kuwait (2)
- China (7)
- Hong Kong
- Iran

Group C

- Japan (4)
- United Arab Emirates (8)
- Uzbekistan
- Saudi Arabia

Group D

- South Korea (1)
- Lebanon
- Syria

=== Women ===
Group A

- Kazakhstan (2)
- China (3)
- Uzbekistan
- India

Group B

- South Korea (1)
- Japan (4)
- Thailand
- Chinese Taipei

== Final standing ==
=== Men ===
Rank	Team	Pld	W	D	L
1st place, gold medalist(s)	Kuwait	8	8	0	0
2nd place, silver medalist(s)	Qatar	8	7	0	1
3rd place, bronze medalist(s)	Iran	8	5	0	3
4	South Korea	7	3	1	3
5	Syria	6	3	0	3
6	Japan	7	3	1	3
7	Bahrain	7	3	0	4
8	Saudi Arabia	7	3	0	4
9	Lebanon	4	2	0	2
10	United Arab Emirates	5	2	0	3
11	China	5	2	0	3
12	India	5	1	0	4
13	Hong Kong	4	1	0	3
14	Uzbekistan	5	1	0	4
15	Macau	4	0	0	4

=== Women ===
Rank	Team	Pld	W	D	L
1st place, gold medalist(s)	South Korea	5	5	0	0
2nd place, silver medalist(s)	Kazakhstan	5	4	0	1
3rd place, bronze medalist(s)	Japan	5	3	0	2
4	China	5	2	0	3
5	Chinese Taipei	4	2	0	2
6	Uzbekistan	4	1	0	3
7	Thailand	4	1	0	3
8	India	4	0	0	4
