= Handball at the 2010 Asian Games – Women's tournament =

Women at the 2010 Asian Games
- Venue: Guanggong Gymnasium
- Date: 18–26 November 2010
- Competitors: 140 from 9 nations

Medalists
gold medal	China
silver medal	Japan
bronze medal	South Korea

Women's handball at the 2010 Asian Games was held in Guangzhou, Guangdong, China from 18 November to 26, 2010.

== Squads ==
China	Chinese Taipei	India	Japan
Xu Mo; Wei Qiuxiang; Ma Ling; Li Bing; Luan Zheng; Li Yao; Zhou Meiwei; Wang Shasha; An Ni; Huang Hong; Liu Xiaomei; Sun Mengying; Sha Zhengwen; Li Weiwei; Zhao Jiaqin; Yan Meizhu	Huang Wei-jung; Chien Chen-chen; Chiu Pei-wen; Tsai Tzu-hsuan; Lin Wen-ya; Hung Tzu-chin; Ho Yu-chen; Wu Yu-jhen; Yang Ya-ting; Chen Yin-ling; Chiu Yu-ting; Fu Ying-wei; Lin Chia-ho; Shih Hsin-yu; Chu Chiu-en; Chen Te-jung	Priyanka; Manisha Rathore; Varuni Negi; Rajwant Kaur; Sanjeeta Ruhel; Reena Kumari; Nisha Patil; Preeti Jangra; Pano Mardi; Dendukuri Madhavi; Gurpreet Kaur; Harleen Kaur; Gurmail Kaur; Venkata Lakshmi; Praseetha Prasannan; Rita Devi	Megumi Takahashi; Aimi Ito; Akie Uegaki; Akina Shinjo; Kaori Nakamura; Shio Fujii; Kumi Mori; Karina Maki; Hiromi Tashiro; Yuko Arihama; Kaoru Yokoshima; Mayuko Ishitate; Rika Wakamatsu; Kaori Fujima; Aiko Hayafune; Sayo Shiota
Kazakhstan	North Korea	Qatar	South Korea
Yevgeniya Nikolayeva; Marina Pikalova; Kristina Nedopekina; Assem Batyrbekova; Yelena Kozlova; Gulzira Iskakova; Olga Yegunova; Yelena Suyazova; Tatyana Parfenova; Natalya Kulakova; Yelena Portova; Yevgeniya Zhulkina; Tatyana Konstantinova; Natalya Kubrina; Dina Sashurkova; Natalya Yakovleva	Ro Myong-a; O Kyong-sun; Jong Yun-mi; Yang Un-sil; Pak Yong-mi; Han Sol-gyong; Kim Un-ok; Kim Chun-yong; Kang Un-hui; Ri Hye-song; Han Jong-hyang; Kil Mi-hyang; Kwak Sun-ok; Mun Un-suk; Yang Un-gyong	Buthaina Al-Muhaizaa; Sara Al-Dossari; Dhabia Al-Naemi; Sulaymah Al-Marri; Maryam Al-Suwaidi; Zayadien Al-Naemi; Abeer Saban Sallam; Aisha Al-Meamari; Noora Al-Muslemani; Rouza Saleh Khalfan; Reem Al-Naemi; Fatma Al-Suwaidi; Alia Al-Abdulla	Woo Sun-hee; Kim On-a; Huh Soon-young; Baek Seung-hee; Bae Min-hee; Kim Cha-youn; Yoon Hyun-kyung; Moon Kyeong-ha; Ryu Eun-hee; Nam Hyun-hwa; Lee Min-hee; Myoung Bok-hee; Kang Ji-hey; Jung Ji-hae; Moon Pil-hee; Lee Eun-bi
Thailand			
Keeratika Lokam; Jitthita Sipak; Thippawan Wongmak; Patchara Nunsuwan; Wongduean Sawatporn; Sunanta Hongbooddee; Sukanya Noowong; Kadnarin Kangrit; Taweeporn Meephian; Panida Nongrueang; Areerat Pinitmontree; Ponpimon Boonnam; Jatuporn Phonsen; Pattarasiri Thanawat; Soonyakan Panyim; Nattha Suphasanan			

== Results ==
All times are China Standard Time (UTC+08:00)

=== Preliminary round ===
==== Group A ====
Pos	Team	Pld	W	D	L	GF	GA	GD	Pts	Qualification
1	South Korea	4	4	0	0	145	65	+80	8	Semifinals
2	Kazakhstan	4	3	0	1	115	71	+44	6	Semifinals
3	Chinese Taipei	4	2	0	2	116	98	+18	4	Placement 5th–6th
4	Thailand	4	1	0	3	78	108	−30	2	Placement 7th–8th
5	Qatar	4	0	0	4	49	161	−112	0	

Source: Results

18 November; 19:00	South Korea	38–17	Thailand	Guanggong Gymnasium, Guangzhou; Referees: Liu, Liu (CHN)
18 November; 19:00	Woo 6	(20–7)	Thanawat 9	Guanggong Gymnasium, Guangzhou; Referees: Liu, Liu (CHN)
18 November; 19:00	3× (yellow card) 3× (suspension)		3× (yellow card) 2× (suspension)	Guanggong Gymnasium, Guangzhou; Referees: Liu, Liu (CHN)

18 November; 20:45	Chinese Taipei	43–14	Qatar	Guanggong Gymnasium, Guangzhou; Referees: Fukushima, Ienaga (JPN)
18 November; 20:45	Chiu P., Tsai, Lin W. 5	(23–5)	Khalfan 7	Guanggong Gymnasium, Guangzhou; Referees: Fukushima, Ienaga (JPN)
18 November; 20:45	3× (yellow card) 3× (suspension)		2× (yellow card) 2× (suspension)	Guanggong Gymnasium, Guangzhou; Referees: Fukushima, Ienaga (JPN)

19 November; 19:00	South Korea	36–19	Chinese Taipei	Guanggong Gymnasium, Guangzhou; Referees: Karbaschi, Kolahdouzan (IRI)
19 November; 19:00	Woo 9	(15–10)	Chiu Y. 5	Guanggong Gymnasium, Guangzhou; Referees: Karbaschi, Kolahdouzan (IRI)
19 November; 19:00	3× (yellow card) 5× (suspension) 1× (red card)		3× (yellow card) 1× (suspension) 1× (red card)	Guanggong Gymnasium, Guangzhou; Referees: Karbaschi, Kolahdouzan (IRI)

19 November; 20:45	Kazakhstan	25–14	Thailand	Guanggong Gymnasium, Guangzhou; Referees: Mousavian, Taghavi (IRI)
19 November; 20:45	Zhulkina 5	(16–4)	Phonsen, Suphasanan 4	Guanggong Gymnasium, Guangzhou; Referees: Mousavian, Taghavi (IRI)
19 November; 20:45	2× (yellow card) 3× (suspension)		4× (yellow card) 5× (suspension)	Guanggong Gymnasium, Guangzhou; Referees: Mousavian, Taghavi (IRI)

20 November; 20:45	Kazakhstan	43–9	Qatar	Guanggong Gymnasium, Guangzhou; Referees: Li, Wang (CHN)
20 November; 20:45	Iskakova 10	(19–4)	Khalfan 4	Guanggong Gymnasium, Guangzhou; Referees: Li, Wang (CHN)
20 November; 20:45	2× (yellow card) 3× (suspension)		3× (yellow card) 2× (suspension)	Guanggong Gymnasium, Guangzhou; Referees: Li, Wang (CHN)

21 November; 17:15	South Korea	46–12	Qatar	Guanggong Gymnasium, Guangzhou; Referees: Hizaki, Ikebuchi (JPN)
21 November; 17:15	Lee E. 8	(23–7)	Khalfan 5	Guanggong Gymnasium, Guangzhou; Referees: Hizaki, Ikebuchi (JPN)
21 November; 17:15	3× (yellow card) 3× (suspension)		5× (suspension)	Guanggong Gymnasium, Guangzhou; Referees: Hizaki, Ikebuchi (JPN)

21 November; 19:00	Chinese Taipei	31–18	Thailand	Guanggong Gymnasium, Guangzhou; Referees: Al-Marzouqi, Al-Nuaimi (UAE)
21 November; 19:00	Yang, Chu 7	(15–12)	Thanawat 8	Guanggong Gymnasium, Guangzhou; Referees: Al-Marzouqi, Al-Nuaimi (UAE)
21 November; 19:00	3× (yellow card) 2× (suspension)		3× (yellow card) 3× (suspension) 1× (red card)	Guanggong Gymnasium, Guangzhou; Referees: Al-Marzouqi, Al-Nuaimi (UAE)

22 November; 19:00	Kazakhstan	30–23	Chinese Taipei	Guanggong Gymnasium, Guangzhou; Referees: Al-Mutawa, Al-Suwailam (KUW)
22 November; 19:00	Nedopekina 8	(13–9)	Chu 8	Guanggong Gymnasium, Guangzhou; Referees: Al-Mutawa, Al-Suwailam (KUW)
22 November; 19:00	3× (yellow card) 2× (suspension)		3× (yellow card) 4× (suspension)	Guanggong Gymnasium, Guangzhou; Referees: Al-Mutawa, Al-Suwailam (KUW)

23 November; 17:15	Thailand	29–14	Qatar	Guanggong Gymnasium, Guangzhou; Referees: Li, Wang (CHN)
23 November; 17:15	Thanawat 7	(14–10)	Al-Muhaizaa, Al-Marri, M. Al-Suwaidi 3	Guanggong Gymnasium, Guangzhou; Referees: Li, Wang (CHN)
23 November; 17:15	4× (yellow card) 3× (suspension)		3× (yellow card) 4× (suspension)	Guanggong Gymnasium, Guangzhou; Referees: Li, Wang (CHN)

23 November; 19:00	South Korea	25–17	Kazakhstan	Guanggong Gymnasium, Guangzhou; Referees: Karbaschi, Kolahdouzan (IRI)
23 November; 19:00	Ryu, Moon P. 8	(13–6)	Nedopekina 4	Guanggong Gymnasium, Guangzhou; Referees: Karbaschi, Kolahdouzan (IRI)
23 November; 19:00	3× (yellow card) 5× (suspension)		3× (yellow card) 4× (suspension)	Guanggong Gymnasium, Guangzhou; Referees: Karbaschi, Kolahdouzan (IRI)

==== Group B ====
Pos	Team	Pld	W	D	L	GF	GA	GD	Pts	Qualification
1	China	3	3	0	0	94	49	+45	6	Semifinals
2	Japan	3	2	0	1	82	68	+14	4	Semifinals
3	North Korea	3	1	0	2	90	74	+16	2	Placement 5th–6th
4	India	3	0	0	3	42	117	−75	0	Placement 7th–8th

Source: Results

18 November; 17:15	China	43–9	India	Guanggong Gymnasium, Guangzhou; Referees: Al-Mizili, Al-Mawlani (BHR)
18 November; 17:15	Wei 10	(20–3)	Negi, Patil, Madhavi 3	Guanggong Gymnasium, Guangzhou; Referees: Al-Mizili, Al-Mawlani (BHR)
18 November; 17:15	3× (yellow card) 3× (suspension)		3× (yellow card) 3× (suspension)	Guanggong Gymnasium, Guangzhou; Referees: Al-Mizili, Al-Mawlani (BHR)

19 November; 17:15	Japan	31–27	North Korea	Guanggong Gymnasium, Guangzhou; Referees: Al-Mutawa, Al-Suwailam (KUW)
19 November; 17:15	Fujii 10	(14–14)	Kwak 7	Guanggong Gymnasium, Guangzhou; Referees: Al-Mutawa, Al-Suwailam (KUW)
19 November; 17:15	3× (yellow card) 3× (suspension)		3× (yellow card) 3× (suspension)	Guanggong Gymnasium, Guangzhou; Referees: Al-Mutawa, Al-Suwailam (KUW)

20 November; 19:00	Japan	32–16	India	Guanggong Gymnasium, Guangzhou; Referees: Al-Mizili, Al-Mawlani (BHR)
20 November; 19:00	Fujii 6	(19–6)	R. Kaur, Patil 4	Guanggong Gymnasium, Guangzhou; Referees: Al-Mizili, Al-Mawlani (BHR)
20 November; 19:00	3× (yellow card) 3× (suspension)		3× (yellow card) 2× (suspension)	Guanggong Gymnasium, Guangzhou; Referees: Al-Mizili, Al-Mawlani (BHR)

21 November; 20:45	China	26–21	North Korea	Guanggong Gymnasium, Guangzhou; Referees: Karbaschi, Kolahdouzan (IRI)
21 November; 20:45	Wei, Sha 6	(10–8)	Jong 5	Guanggong Gymnasium, Guangzhou; Referees: Karbaschi, Kolahdouzan (IRI)
21 November; 20:45	3× (yellow card) 6× (suspension)		4× (yellow card) 5× (suspension)	Guanggong Gymnasium, Guangzhou; Referees: Karbaschi, Kolahdouzan (IRI)

22 November; 20:45	India	17–42	North Korea	Guanggong Gymnasium, Guangzhou; Referees: Liu, Liu (CHN)
22 November; 20:45	Lakshmi 4	(8–23)	Pak 8	Guanggong Gymnasium, Guangzhou; Referees: Liu, Liu (CHN)
22 November; 20:45	3× (yellow card) 2× (suspension)		3× (yellow card) 5× (suspension)	Guanggong Gymnasium, Guangzhou; Referees: Liu, Liu (CHN)

23 November; 20:45	Japan	19–25	China	Guanggong Gymnasium, Guangzhou; Referees: Al-Mizili, Al-Mawlani (BHR)
23 November; 20:45	Fujii 8	(6–12)	Li W. 6	Guanggong Gymnasium, Guangzhou; Referees: Al-Mizili, Al-Mawlani (BHR)
23 November; 20:45	3× (yellow card) 3× (suspension)		2× (yellow card) 5× (suspension)	Guanggong Gymnasium, Guangzhou; Referees: Al-Mizili, Al-Mawlani (BHR)

=== Placement 5th–8th ===
==== Placement 7th–8th ====
25 November; 18:00	Thailand	25–15	India	Guanggong Gymnasium, Guangzhou; Referees: Li, Wang (CHN)
25 November; 18:00	Thanawat 8	(9–6)	Patil 5	Guanggong Gymnasium, Guangzhou; Referees: Li, Wang (CHN)
25 November; 18:00	3× (yellow card) 3× (suspension)		3× (yellow card) 2× (suspension) 1× (red card)	Guanggong Gymnasium, Guangzhou; Referees: Li, Wang (CHN)

==== Placement 5th–6th ====
25 November; 20:15	Chinese Taipei	17–38	North Korea	Guanggong Gymnasium, Guangzhou; Referees: Fukushima, Ienaga (JPN)
25 November; 20:15	Chu 4	(7–23)	Kwak, Yang U.G. 9	Guanggong Gymnasium, Guangzhou; Referees: Fukushima, Ienaga (JPN)
25 November; 20:15	3× (yellow card) 2× (suspension)		3× (yellow card) 3× (suspension)	Guanggong Gymnasium, Guangzhou; Referees: Fukushima, Ienaga (JPN)

=== Final round ===
Semifinals
25 November
South Korea	28
Japan	29
25 November
China	24
Kazakhstan	18

Gold medal match
26 November
Japan	22
China	31
Bronze medal match
26 November
South Korea	38
Kazakhstan	26

==== Semifinals ====
25 November; 12:00	South Korea	28–29	Japan	Guanggong Gymnasium, Guangzhou; Referees: Mousavian, Taghavi (IRI)
25 November; 12:00	Ryu, Moon P. 6	(11–15)	Fujii 9	Guanggong Gymnasium, Guangzhou; Referees: Mousavian, Taghavi (IRI)
25 November; 12:00	2× (yellow card) 1× (suspension)		4× (yellow card) 2× (suspension)	Guanggong Gymnasium, Guangzhou; Referees: Mousavian, Taghavi (IRI)

25 November; 14:15	China	24–18	Kazakhstan	Guanggong Gymnasium, Guangzhou; Referees: Al-Marzouqi, Al-Nuaimi (UAE)
25 November; 14:15	Li W. 5	(11–10)	Pikalova 5	Guanggong Gymnasium, Guangzhou; Referees: Al-Marzouqi, Al-Nuaimi (UAE)
25 November; 14:15	1× (yellow card) 5× (suspension)		2× (yellow card) 2× (suspension)	Guanggong Gymnasium, Guangzhou; Referees: Al-Marzouqi, Al-Nuaimi (UAE)

==== Bronze medal match ====
26 November; 12:00	South Korea	38–26	Kazakhstan	Guanggong Gymnasium, Guangzhou; Referees: Liu, Liu (CHN)
26 November; 12:00	Woo, Kim O., Ryu 8	(20–11)	Sashurkova 7	Guanggong Gymnasium, Guangzhou; Referees: Liu, Liu (CHN)
26 November; 12:00	3× (yellow card) 4× (suspension) 1× (red card)		3× (yellow card) 2× (suspension) 1× (red card)	Guanggong Gymnasium, Guangzhou; Referees: Liu, Liu (CHN)

==== Gold medal match ====
26 November; 14:15	Japan	22–31	China	Guanggong Gymnasium, Guangzhou; Referees: Al-Marzouqi, Al-Nuaimi (UAE)
26 November; 14:15	Fujii 7	(13–14)	Sha 8	Guanggong Gymnasium, Guangzhou; Referees: Al-Marzouqi, Al-Nuaimi (UAE)
26 November; 14:15	3× (yellow card) 2× (suspension)		3× (yellow card) 3× (suspension)	Guanggong Gymnasium, Guangzhou; Referees: Al-Marzouqi, Al-Nuaimi (UAE)

== Final standing ==
Rank	Team	Pld	W	D	L
1st place, gold medalist(s)	China	5	5	0	0
2nd place, silver medalist(s)	Japan	5	3	0	2
3rd place, bronze medalist(s)	South Korea	6	5	0	1
4	Kazakhstan	6	3	0	3
5	North Korea	4	2	0	2
6	Chinese Taipei	5	2	0	3
7	Thailand	5	2	0	3
8	India	4	0	0	4
9	Qatar	4	0	0	4
