= Handball at the 2006 Asian Games – Women's tournament =

2006 Asian Games Handball competition

Women at the 2006 Asian Games
- Venue: Al-Gharafa Indoor Hall
- Date: 6–13 December 2006
- Competitors: 123 from 8 nations

Medalists
gold medal	South Korea
silver medal	Kazakhstan
bronze medal	Japan

Women's handball at the 2006 Asian Games was held in Al-Gharafa Indoor Hall, Al-Rayyan from 3 December 6 to 13 December 2006.

== Squads ==
China	Chinese Taipei	India	Japan
Liu Guini; Liu Yun; Li Bing; Luan Zheng; Wang Chanchan; Wang Min; Wang Shasha; Zhang Zhiqing; Huang Hong; Wu Yanan; Liu Xiaomei; Sun Laimiao; Yu Geli; Wu Wenjuan; Li Weiwei	Chang Ya-wei; Wen Hui-tzu; Lin Wen-ya; Yang Ya-ting; Hsu Ju-fang; Chen Te-jung; Lin Li-ping; Chia Ling-hui; Tseng Chien-chiu; Chen Yi-ling; Kung Ju-wen; Chu Chiu-en; Yang Chia-wen; Su Chia-li; Chen Ying-ju; Tu Hsiao-yuan	Amita Kumari; P. P. Shajina; Anita Kumari; Sangita Tiwari; Seena Chamundi; Juliet Lawrence; Pushpa; Karishma Sahu; Anamika Mukherjee; Renu Goswami; Kamini Gautam; Priyanka; Urmila Kumari; Pavana Raja Gopal; Sangeeta Kataria; Rita Devi	Sachiko Katsuda; Yuko Arihama; Mariko Komatsu; Kaori Onozawa; Akiko Kinjo; Hitomi Sakugawa; Tomoko Sakamoto; Aiko Hayafune; Kimiko Hida; Keiko Mizuno; Noriko Omae; Hisayo Taniguchi; Mami Tanaka; Kazusa Nagano; Eiko Yamada; Akie Uegaki
Kazakhstan	South Korea	Thailand	Uzbekistan
Olga Travnikova; Olga Adzhiderskaya; Marina Buzmakova; Irina Borechko; Marina Pikalova; Alexandra Yefimova; Lyazzat Kilibayeva; Yelena Kozlova; Gulnar Mendybayeva; Yelena Portova; Natalya Kubrina; Anastassiya Batuyeva; Yuliya Goncharova; Yevgeniya Nikolayeva; Natalya Yakovleva; Yana Vassilyeva	Woo Sun-hee; Yoon Hyun-kyung; Huh Soon-young; Lee Gong-joo; An Jung-hwa; Yu Ji-yeong; Kim Cha-youn; Huh Young-sook; Moon Kyeong-ha; Park Chung-hee; Kwon Geun-hae; Lee Min-hee; Myoung Bok-hee; Kang Ji-hey; Choi Im-jeong; Moon Pil-hee	Keeratika Lokam; Supannee Vilasang; Jitthita Sipak; Areerat Pinitmontree; Taweeporn Meephian; Jatuporn Phonsen; Thidaporn Sutthachip; Pattarasiri Thanawat; Busarakam Sriruksa; Chamaiporn Camjun; Nattha Suphasanan; Nantiya Chawdorn; Soonyakan Panyim; Duangjai Thaohom; Preeyanut Bureeruk	Dilbar Safina; Nadejda Shadrina; Alla Beketova; Lola Kudratova; Alina Sukhoplyasova; Zinaida Penkova; Anastasiya Tkachyova; Kristina Ofitserova; Asya Yusupova; Ekaterina Antonova; Margarita Pshenichnaya; Elena Udiryakova; Aziza Abzalova

== Results ==
All times are Arabia Standard Time (UTC+03:00)

=== Preliminary league ===
==== Group A ====
Pos	Team	Pld	W	D	L	GF	GA	GD	Pts	Qualification
1	Kazakhstan	3	3	0	0	93	54	+39	6	Semifinals
2	China	3	2	0	1	127	68	+59	4	Semifinals
3	Uzbekistan	3	1	0	2	58	93	−35	2	Placement 5–6
4	India	3	0	0	3	60	123	−63	0	Placement 7–8

Source: Results

6 December; 10:00	Kazakhstan	23–12	Uzbekistan	Al-Gharafa Indoor Hall, Al-Rayyan; Referees: Al-Suwaidi, Al-Marzouqi (UAE)
6 December; 10:00	Pikalova, Yakovleva 5	(13–6)	Sukhoplyasova 4	Al-Gharafa Indoor Hall, Al-Rayyan; Referees: Al-Suwaidi, Al-Marzouqi (UAE)
6 December; 10:00	3× (yellow card) 4× (suspension)		3× (yellow card) 3× (suspension)	Al-Gharafa Indoor Hall, Al-Rayyan; Referees: Al-Suwaidi, Al-Marzouqi (UAE)

6 December; 12:00	China	56–19	India	Al-Gharafa Indoor Hall, Al-Rayyan; Referees: Dib, Haidar (LIB)
6 December; 12:00	Wang M. 7	(29–11)	An. Kumari 13	Al-Gharafa Indoor Hall, Al-Rayyan; Referees: Dib, Haidar (LIB)
6 December; 12:00	3× (yellow card) 2× (suspension)		3× (yellow card) 1× (suspension)	Al-Gharafa Indoor Hall, Al-Rayyan; Referees: Dib, Haidar (LIB)

8 December; 10:00	Kazakhstan	38–17	India	Al-Gharafa Indoor Hall, Al-Rayyan; Referees: Dib, Haidar (LIB)
8 December; 10:00	Pikalova 11	(18–12)	An. Kumari 7	Al-Gharafa Indoor Hall, Al-Rayyan; Referees: Dib, Haidar (LIB)
8 December; 10:00	3× (yellow card) 3× (suspension)		3× (yellow card) 3× (suspension)	Al-Gharafa Indoor Hall, Al-Rayyan; Referees: Dib, Haidar (LIB)

8 December; 12:00	China	46–17	Uzbekistan	Al-Gharafa Indoor Hall, Al-Rayyan; Referees: Kim, Kim (KOR)
8 December; 12:00	Wang M., Li W. 7	(24–9)	Kudratova 4	Al-Gharafa Indoor Hall, Al-Rayyan; Referees: Kim, Kim (KOR)
8 December; 12:00	3× (yellow card) 6× (suspension)		2× (yellow card) 2× (suspension)	Al-Gharafa Indoor Hall, Al-Rayyan; Referees: Kim, Kim (KOR)

10 December; 9:30	Kazakhstan	32–25	China	Al-Gharafa Indoor Hall, Al-Rayyan; Referees: Karbaschi, Kolahdouzan (IRI)
10 December; 9:30	Portova 7	(15–9)	Li W. 8	Al-Gharafa Indoor Hall, Al-Rayyan; Referees: Karbaschi, Kolahdouzan (IRI)
10 December; 9:30	3× (yellow card) 7× (suspension)		4× (yellow card) 9× (suspension)	Al-Gharafa Indoor Hall, Al-Rayyan; Referees: Karbaschi, Kolahdouzan (IRI)

10 December; 13:30	Uzbekistan	29–24	India	Al-Gharafa Indoor Hall, Al-Rayyan; Referees: Tanji, Samha (SYR)
10 December; 13:30	Udiryakova 6	(14–9)	An. Kumari 10	Al-Gharafa Indoor Hall, Al-Rayyan; Referees: Tanji, Samha (SYR)
10 December; 13:30	1× (yellow card) 9× (suspension)		2× (yellow card) 1× (suspension)	Al-Gharafa Indoor Hall, Al-Rayyan; Referees: Tanji, Samha (SYR)

==== Group B ====
Pos	Team	Pld	W	D	L	GF	GA	GD	Pts	Qualification
1	South Korea	3	3	0	0	117	52	+65	6	Semifinals
2	Japan	3	2	0	1	92	61	+31	4	Semifinals
3	Chinese Taipei	3	1	0	2	67	99	−32	2	Placement 5–6
4	Thailand	3	0	0	3	51	115	−64	0	Placement 7–8

Source: Results

7 December; 10:00	South Korea	45–14	Thailand	Al-Gharafa Indoor Hall, Al-Rayyan; Referees: Liu, Liu (CHN)
7 December; 10:00	An 7	(22–7)	Thanawat 4	Al-Gharafa Indoor Hall, Al-Rayyan; Referees: Liu, Liu (CHN)
7 December; 10:00	3× (yellow card)		2× (yellow card) 1× (suspension)	Al-Gharafa Indoor Hall, Al-Rayyan; Referees: Liu, Liu (CHN)

7 December; 12:00	Japan	31–20	Chinese Taipei	Al-Gharafa Indoor Hall, Al-Rayyan; Referees: Abdulhusain, Khalaf (KUW)
7 December; 12:00	Kinjo 5	(14–11)	Chen Y.J. 6	Al-Gharafa Indoor Hall, Al-Rayyan; Referees: Abdulhusain, Khalaf (KUW)
7 December; 12:00	3× (yellow card) 4× (suspension)		2× (yellow card) 4× (suspension)	Al-Gharafa Indoor Hall, Al-Rayyan; Referees: Abdulhusain, Khalaf (KUW)

9 December; 10:00	South Korea	44–17	Chinese Taipei	Al-Gharafa Indoor Hall, Al-Rayyan; Referees: Ogasawara, Hamada (JPN)
9 December; 10:00	Woo 9	(23–8)	Chia 6	Al-Gharafa Indoor Hall, Al-Rayyan; Referees: Ogasawara, Hamada (JPN)
9 December; 10:00	3× (yellow card) 2× (suspension)		3× (yellow card) 2× (suspension)	Al-Gharafa Indoor Hall, Al-Rayyan; Referees: Ogasawara, Hamada (JPN)

9 December; 12:00	Japan	40–13	Thailand	Al-Gharafa Indoor Hall, Al-Rayyan; Referees: Liu, Liu (CHN)
9 December; 12:00	Hayafune, Uegaki 6	(22–7)	Sriruksa, Camjun 3	Al-Gharafa Indoor Hall, Al-Rayyan; Referees: Liu, Liu (CHN)
9 December; 12:00	3× (yellow card) 3× (suspension)		2× (yellow card) 1× (suspension)	Al-Gharafa Indoor Hall, Al-Rayyan; Referees: Liu, Liu (CHN)

10 December; 11:30	South Korea	28–21	Japan	Al-Gharafa Indoor Hall, Al-Rayyan; Referees: Abdulhusain, Khalaf (KUW)
10 December; 11:30	four players 4	(16–9)	Kinjo 7	Al-Gharafa Indoor Hall, Al-Rayyan; Referees: Abdulhusain, Khalaf (KUW)
10 December; 11:30	2× (yellow card) 3× (suspension)		3× (yellow card) 2× (suspension)	Al-Gharafa Indoor Hall, Al-Rayyan; Referees: Abdulhusain, Khalaf (KUW)

10 December; 15:30	Thailand	24–30	Chinese Taipei	Al-Gharafa Indoor Hall, Al-Rayyan; Referees: Dib, Haidar (LIB)
10 December; 15:30	Sriruksa 5	(12–17)	Chia 13	Al-Gharafa Indoor Hall, Al-Rayyan; Referees: Dib, Haidar (LIB)
10 December; 15:30	3× (yellow card) 1× (suspension)		3× (yellow card) 1× (suspension)	Al-Gharafa Indoor Hall, Al-Rayyan; Referees: Dib, Haidar (LIB)

=== Placement 5–8 ===
==== Placement 7–8 ====
12 December; 10:00	India	20–43	Thailand	Al-Gharafa Indoor Hall, Al-Rayyan; Referees: Liu, Liu (CHN)
12 December; 10:00	An. Kumari 5	(9–25)	Thanawat 8	Al-Gharafa Indoor Hall, Al-Rayyan; Referees: Liu, Liu (CHN)
12 December; 10:00	3× (yellow card) 4× (suspension)		3× (yellow card) 4× (suspension)	Al-Gharafa Indoor Hall, Al-Rayyan; Referees: Liu, Liu (CHN)

==== Placement 5–6 ====
12 December; 12:00	Uzbekistan	25–26	Chinese Taipei	Al-Gharafa Indoor Hall, Al-Rayyan; Referees: Dib, Haidar (LIB)
12 December; 12:00	Sukhoplyasova 6	(11–16)	Chen Y.J. 9	Al-Gharafa Indoor Hall, Al-Rayyan; Referees: Dib, Haidar (LIB)
12 December; 12:00	3× (yellow card) 3× (suspension)		3× (yellow card) 1× (suspension)	Al-Gharafa Indoor Hall, Al-Rayyan; Referees: Dib, Haidar (LIB)

=== Final round ===
Semifinals
11 December
Kazakhstan	32
Japan	28
11 December
South Korea	34
China	32

Gold medal match
13 December
Kazakhstan	22
South Korea	29
Bronze medal match
13 December
Japan	25
China	22

==== Semifinals ====
11 December; 14:00	Kazakhstan	32–28	Japan	Al-Gharafa Indoor Hall, Al-Rayyan; Referees: Karbaschi, Kolahdouzan (IRI)
11 December; 14:00	Adzhiderskaya, Kozlova 11	(17–14)	Hayafune 9	Al-Gharafa Indoor Hall, Al-Rayyan; Referees: Karbaschi, Kolahdouzan (IRI)
11 December; 14:00	3× (yellow card) 5× (suspension)		4× (yellow card) 6× (suspension)	Al-Gharafa Indoor Hall, Al-Rayyan; Referees: Karbaschi, Kolahdouzan (IRI)

11 December; 16:00	South Korea	34–32	China	Al-Gharafa Indoor Hall, Al-Rayyan; Referees: Tanji, Samha (SYR)
11 December; 16:00	Choi 8	(18–14)	Li W. 8	Al-Gharafa Indoor Hall, Al-Rayyan; Referees: Tanji, Samha (SYR)
11 December; 16:00	3× (yellow card) 4× (suspension) 1× (red card)		3× (yellow card) 5× (suspension)	Al-Gharafa Indoor Hall, Al-Rayyan; Referees: Tanji, Samha (SYR)

==== Bronze medal match ====
13 December; 16:00	Japan	25–22	China	Al-Gharafa Indoor Hall, Al-Rayyan; Referees: Ossipov, Porol (KAZ)
13 December; 16:00	Kinjo, Taniguchi, Yamada 5	(16–13)	Li W. 13	Al-Gharafa Indoor Hall, Al-Rayyan; Referees: Ossipov, Porol (KAZ)
13 December; 16:00	4× (yellow card) 4× (suspension)		4× (yellow card) 4× (suspension)	Al-Gharafa Indoor Hall, Al-Rayyan; Referees: Ossipov, Porol (KAZ)

==== Gold medal match ====
13 December; 18:00	Kazakhstan	22–29	South Korea	Al-Gharafa Indoor Hall, Al-Rayyan; Referees: Tanji, Samha (SYR)
13 December; 18:00	Adzhiderskaya, Kozlova 4	(14–14)	Moon P. 9	Al-Gharafa Indoor Hall, Al-Rayyan; Referees: Tanji, Samha (SYR)
13 December; 18:00	2× (yellow card) 1× (suspension)		3× (yellow card) 3× (suspension)	Al-Gharafa Indoor Hall, Al-Rayyan; Referees: Tanji, Samha (SYR)

== Final standing ==
Rank	Team	Pld	W	D	L
1st place, gold medalist(s)	South Korea	5	5	0	0
2nd place, silver medalist(s)	Kazakhstan	5	4	0	1
3rd place, bronze medalist(s)	Japan	5	3	0	2
4	China	5	2	0	3
5	Chinese Taipei	4	2	0	2
6	Uzbekistan	4	1	0	3
7	Thailand	4	1	0	3
8	India	4	0	0	4
