= South Korea at the 2006 Asian Games =

- IOC code: KOR
- NOC: Korean Olympic Committee

in Doha
- Competitors: 645 in 37 sports
- Flag bearer: Lee Kyu-sup
- Officials: 187
- Medals Ranked 2nd: Gold 58 Silver 52 Bronze 83 Total 193

Asian Games appearances (overview)
- 1954; 1958; 1962; 1966; 1970; 1974; 1978; 1982; 1986; 1990; 1994; 1998; 2002; 2006; 2010; 2014; 2018; 2022; 2026

South Korea participated in the 2006 Asian Games in Doha, Qatar on 1–15 December 2006. South Korea ranked 2nd with 58 gold medals in this edition of the Asiad.

== Medal summary ==
=== Medal table ===
Sport	Gold	Silver	Bronze	Total
Taekwondo	9	1	1	11
Wrestling	5	3	3	11
Cycling	5	2	8	15
Fencing	4	7	3	14
Judo	4	5	3	12
Bowling	4	4	3	11
Archery	4	1	0	5
Golf	4	0	1	5
Shooting	3	7	10	20
Swimming	3	2	11	16
Soft tennis	2	2	3	7
Equestrian	2	1	1	4
Gymnastics	2	0	4	6
Rowing	1	2	1	4
Athletics	1	1	3	5
Sailing	1	1	2	4
Tennis	1	1	1	3
Handball	1	0	0	1
Hockey	1	0	0	1
Volleyball	1	0	0	1
Weightlifting	0	4	4	8
Boxing	0	3	1	4
Table tennis	0	2	3	5
Badminton	0	1	5	6
Cue sports	0	1	1	2
Rugby union	0	1	0	1
Wushu	0	0	3	3
Bodybuilding	0	0	2	2
Canoeing	0	0	2	2
Diving	0	0	2	2
Baseball	0	0	1	1
Sepaktakraw	0	0	1	1
Totals (32 entries)	58	52	83	193

=== Medalists ===
==== Gold ====
- Archery – Men's individual : Im Dong-Hyun
- Archery – Women's individual : Park Sung-hyun
- Archery – Men's team : Im Dong-Hyun, Jang Yong-Ho, Lee Chang-Hwan, Park Kyung-Mo
- Archery – Women's team : Lee Tuk-Young, Park Sung-hyun, Yun Mi-Jin, Yun Ok-Hee
- Athletics – Men's javelin throw : Park Jae-Myong
- Bowling – Men's masters : Jo Nam-Yi
- Bowling – Women's trios : Kim Hyo-Mi, Hwang Sun-Ok, Nam Bo-Ra
- Bowling – Women's all events : Choi Jin-A
- Bowling – Women's masters : Choi Jin-A
- Cycling – Men's keirin : Kang Dong-Jin
- Cycling – Men's individual pursuit : Jang Sun-jae
- Cycling – Women's individual pursuit : Lee Min-Hye
- Cycling – Men's madison : Jang Sun-jae, Park Sung-Baek
- Cycling – Men's team pursuit : Hwang In-Hyeok, Jang Sun-jae, Kim Dong-Hun, Park Sung-Baek
- Equestrian – Men's dressage : Choi Jun-Sang
- Equestrian – Men's team dressage : Choi Jun-Sang, Kim Dong-Seon, Shin Soo-Jin, Seo Jung-Kyun
- Fencing – Women's Épée individual : Park Se-Ra
- Fencing – Women's Foil individual : Nam Hyun-Hee
- Fencing – Men's Épée team : Jung Jin-Sun, Kim Seung-Gu, Kim Won-Jin, Park Sang-Sun
- Fencing – Women's Foil team : Jeon Hee-Sook, Jung Gil-Ok, Nam Hyun-Hee, Seo Mi-Jung
- Golf – Men's individual : Kim Kyung-Tae
- Golf – Women's individual : Ryu So-Yeon
- Golf – Men's team : Kang Sung-hoon, Kim Do-hoon 752, Kim Do-hoon 753, Kim Kyung-Tae
- Golf – Women's team : Choi Hye-Yong, Chung Jae-Eun, Ryu So-Yeon
- Gymnastics – Men's parallel bars : Kim Dae-Eun
- Gymnastics – Men's pommel horse : Kim Soo-Myun
- Handball – Women's team : Moon Kyeong-Ha, Kim Cha-Youn, Choi Im-Jeong, Lee Min-Hee, Moon Pil-Hee, Woo Sun-Hee, Kang Ji-Hey, Myoung Bok-Hee, An Jung-Hwa, Huh Young-Sook, Huh Soon-Young, Park Chung-Hee, Yoon Hyun-Kyung, Kwon Geun-Hae, Lee Gong-Joo, Yu Ji-Yeong
- Hockey – Men's team : Ko Dong-Sik, Lee Seung-Il, Kim Chul, Kim Yong-Bae, Lee Nam-Yong, Seo Jong-Ho, Kang Seong-Jung, Yoon Sung-Hoon, You Hyo-Sik, Yeo Chang-Yong, Cha Jong-Bok, Lee Myung-Ho, Hong Eun-Seong, Hong Sung-Kweon, Yeo Woon-Kon, Jang Jong-Hyun
- Judo – Men's 73 kg : Lee Won-Hee
- Judo – Men's 90 kg : Hwang Hee-Tae
- Judo – Men's 100 kg : Jang Sung-ho
- Judo – Men's openweight : Kim Sung-Bum
- Rowing – Men's single sculls : Shin Eun-chul
- Sailing – Men's 470 : Kim Dae-young, Jung Sung-an
- Shooting – Women's double trap : Son Hye-kyung
- Shooting – Men's 25m standard pistol team : Hwang Yoon-sam, Jang Dae-kyu, Park Byung-taek
- Shooting – Women's double trap team : Kim Mi-jin, Son Hye-kyung, Lee Bo-na
- Soft tennis – Mixed doubles : Wi Hyu-hwan, Kim Ji-Eun
- Soft tennis – Women's team : Kim Kyung-hyun, Lee Kyung-pyo, Lee Bok-soon, Min Soo-kyung, Kim Ji-eun
- Swimming – Men's 200 m freestyle : Park Tae-hwan
- Swimming – Men's 400 m freestyle : Park Tae-hwan
- Swimming – Men's 1500 m freestyle : Park Tae-hwan
- Taekwondo – Men's 58 kg : You Young-dae
- Taekwondo – Men's 62 kg : Kim Ju-Young
- Taekwondo – Men's 67 kg : Song Myeong-seob
- Taekwondo – Men's 72 kg : Lee Young-yeoul
- Taekwondo – Men's +84 kg : Kim Hak-hwan
- Taekwondo – Women's 51 kg : Kwon Eun-kyung
- Taekwondo – Women's 55 kg : Kim Bo-hye
- Taekwondo – Women's 59 kg : Lee Sung-hye
- Taekwondo – Women's 67 kg : Hwang Kyung-Seon
- Tennis – Men's team : An Jae-Sung, Chung Hee-Seok, Jeon Woong-Sun, Lee Hyung-Taik
- Volleyball – Men's team : Shin Jin-Sik, Kwon Young-Min, Moon Sung-Min, Yeo Oh-Hyun, Song Byung-Il, Lee Sun-Kyu, Who In-Jung, Yun Bong-Woo, Lee Kyung-Soo, Kim Yo-han, Ha Kyoung-Min, Chang Byung-Chul
- Wrestling – Men's freestyle 66 kg : Baek Jin-Kuk
- Wrestling – Men's Greco-Roman 66 kg : Kim Min-Chul
- Wrestling – Men's Greco-Roman 84 kg : Kim Jung-Sub
- Wrestling – Men's Greco-Roman 96 kg : Han Tae-Young
- Wrestling – Men's Greco-Roman 120 kg : Kim Gwang-Seok

==== Silver ====
- Archery – Women's individual : Yun Ok-Hee
- Athletics – Men's 20 km walk : Kim Hyun-Sub
- Badminton – Men's team : Shon Seung-Mo, Jung Jae-Sung, Park Sung-Hwan, Lee Yong-Dae, Hwang Jung-Un, Hwang Ji-Man, Lee Jae-Jin, Lee Hyun-Il
- Bodybuilding – Men's 90 kg : Kim Myong-Hun
- Bowling – Men's singles : Choi Bok-Eum
- Bowling – Men's team of 5 : Choi Bok-Eum, Joung Seoung-Joo, Byun Ho-Jin, Kang Hee-Won, Jo Nam-Yi, Park Sang-Pil
- Bowling – Women's doubles : Choi Jin-A, Kim Yeo-Jin
- Bowling – Women's team of 5 : Choi Jin-A, Hwang Sun-Ok, Gang Hye-Eun, Kim Yeo-Jin, Nam Bo-Ra
- Boxing – Men's bantamweight (54 kg) : Han Soon-Chul
- Boxing – Men's light-welterweight (64 kg) : Shin Myung-Hoon
- Boxing – Men's light-heavyweight (81 kg) : Song Hak-Sung
- Cue sports – Women's eight-ball singles : Kim Ga-Young
- Cycling – Men's sprint : Choi Lae-Seon
- Cycling – Women's points race : Lee Min-Hye
- Equestrian – Men's team jumping : Hwang Soon-Won, Joo Jung-Hyun, Park Jae-Hong, Song Sang-Wook
- Fencing – Men's Foil individual : Lee Cheon-Woong
- Fencing – Men's Sabre individual : Oh Eun-Seok
- Fencing – Women's Foil individual : Seo Mi-Jung
- Fencing – Men's Foil team : Cha Hyung-Woo, Choi Byung-Chul, Ha Chang-Duk, Lee Cheon-Woong
- Fencing – Men's Sabre team : Lee Hyuk, Oh Eun-Seok, Oh Seung-Hwan, Won Woo-Young
- Fencing – Women's Épée team : Choi Eun-Sook, Jung Hyo-Jung, Park Se-Ra, Shin A-Lam
- Fencing – Women's Sabre team : Jang Hyun-Kyung, Kim Hye-Lim, Kim Keum-Hwa, Lee Shin-Mi
- Judo – Men's 60 kg : Cho Nam-Suk
- Judo – Women's 48 kg : Kim Young-Ran
- Judo – Women's 63 kg : Kong Ja-Young
- Judo – Women's 70 kg : Bae Eun-Hye
- Judo – Women's 78 kg : Lee So-Yeon
- Rowing – Men's double sculls : Kim Dal-Ho, Ham Jung-Wook
- Rowing – Women's double sculls : Kim Ok-Kyung, Shin Yeong-Eun
- Rugby union – Men's sevens : Chun Jong-Man, Kim Jong-Su, Chae Jae-Young, Kim Hyung-Ki, Lee Myung-Geun, Youn Kwon-Woo, Yang Young-Hun, Yun Hi-Su, You Young-Nam, Lee Kwang-Moon, Kwak Chul-Woong, Yoo Min-Hyung
- Sailing – Hobie 16 : Park Kyu-Tae, Sung Chang-Il
- Shooting – Men's 25m standard pistol : Park Byung-Taek
- Shooting – Men's 10m air pistol team : Jin Jong-oh, Kim Young-Wook, Lee Dae-myung
- Shooting – Men's 10m air rifle team : Kim Hye-Sung, Yu Jae-Chul, Chae Keun-Bae
- Shooting – Men's 10m running target team : Cho Se-Jong, Hwang Young-Do, Jeong You-Jin
- Shooting – Men's 25m centre fire pistol team : Hong Seong-Hwan, Jang Dae-Kyu, Park Byung-Taek
- Shooting – Men's 50m rifle prone team : Jeon Dong-Ju, Lee Hyun-Tae, Park Bong-Duk
- Shooting – Women's 50m rifle 3-positions team : Lee Hye-jin, Na Yoon-Kyung, Lee Sang-Soon
- Soft tennis – Men's doubles : Yoo Young-Dong, Kim Jae-Bok
- Soft tennis – Mixed doubles : Yoo Young-Dong, Kim Kyung-Ryun
- Swimming – Men's 100 m freestyle : Park Tae-Hwan
- Swimming – Women's 200 m butterfly : Choi Hye-Ra
- Table tennis – Men's team : Oh Sang-Eun, Ryu Seung-Min, Joo Se-Hyuk, Lee Jung-Woo, Yoon Jae-Young
- Table tennis – Mixed doubles : Lee Jung-Woo, Lee Eun-Hee
- Taekwondo – Men's 84 kg : Park Kyeong-Hoon
- Tennis – Men's singles : Lee Hyung-Taik
- Weightlifting – Men's 77 kg : Lee Jeong-Jae
- Weightlifting – Men's 94 kg : Lee Eung-Jo
- Weightlifting – Women's 75 kg : Kim Soon-Hee
- Weightlifting – Women's +75 kg : Jang Mi-Ran
- Wrestling – Men's freestyle 60 kg : Song Jae-Myung
- Wrestling – Men's freestyle 74 kg : Cho Byung-Kwan
- Wrestling – Women's freestyle 48 kg : Kim Hyung-Joo

==== Bronze ====
- Athletics – Men's decathlon : Kim Kun-Woo
- Athletics – Men's triple jump : Kim Deok-Hyeon
- Athletics – Women's 100 m hurdles : Lee Yeon-Kyung
- Badminton – Men's singles : Lee Hyun-Il
- Badminton – Women's singles : Hwang Hye-Youn
- Badminton – Men's doubles : Jung Jae-Sung, Lee Yong-Dae
- Badminton – Women's doubles : Lee Kyung-Won, Lee Hyo-jung
- Badminton – Women's team : Lee Kyung-Won, Lee Hyo-jung, Hwang Yu-Mi, Lee Yun-Hwa, Ha Jung-Eun, Lee Hyun-jin, Hwang Hye-Youn, Jun Jae-Youn
- Baseball – Men's team : Cho Dong-Chan, Jo In-seong, Jang Sung-Ho, Jang Won-Sam, Jeong Keun-Woo, Jung Min-Hyuk, Kang Min-Ho, Lee Byung-Kyu, Lee Dae-Ho, Lee Hei-Chun, Lee Jin-Young, Lee Taek-Keun, Lee Yong-Kyu, Oh Seung-Hwan, Park Jae-Hong, Park Jin-Man, Park Ki-Hyuk, Ryu Hyun-Jin, Shin Chul-In, Son Min-Han, Woo Kyu-Min, Yoon Suk-Min
- Bodybuilding – Men's 80 kg : Lee Do-Hee
- Bodybuilding – Men's 85 kg : Kang Kyung-Won
- Bowling – Men's masters : Choi Bok-Eum
- Bowling – Women's masters : Kim Yeo-Jin
- Bowling – Women's trios : Choi Jin-A, Gang Hye-Eun, Kim Yeo-Jin
- Boxing – Men's light-flyweight (48 kg) : Hong Moo-Won
- Canoeing – Men's K1 1000 m : Moon Chul-Wook
- Canoeing – Women's K2 500 m : Lee Sun-Ja, Lee Ae-Yeon
- Cue sports – Men's three-cushion billiards singles : Kim Kyung-Roul
- Cycling – Men's road race : Park Sung-Baek
- Cycling – Men's 1 km time trial : Kang Dong-Jin
- Cycling – Men's individual pursuit : Hwang In-Hyeok
- Cycling – Women's road race : Han Song-Hee
- Cycling – Women's individual time trial : Lee Min-Hye
- Cycling – Women's sprint : Yoo Jin-A
- Cycling – Women's 500 m time trial : Yoo Jin-A
- Cycling – Men's team sprint : Choi Lae-Seon, Kang Dong-Jin, Yang Hee-Chun
- Diving – Men's synchronized 3 m springboard : Kwon Kyung-Min, Cho Kwan-Hoon
- Diving – Men's synchronized 10 m platform : Kwon Kyung-Min, Cho Kwan-Hoon
- Equestrian – Men's jumping : Joo Jung-Hyun
- Fencing – Men's Épée individual : Kim Seung-Gu
- Fencing – Women's Épée individual : Shin A-Lam
- Fencing – Women's Sabre individual : Kim Keum-Hwa
- Golf – Women's individual : Choi Hye-Yong
- Gymnastics – Men's floor : Kim Soo-Myun
- Gymnastics – Men's horizontal bar : Kim Ji-Hoon
- Gymnastics – Men's artistic team : Kim Dae-Eun, Kim Ji-Hoon, Kim Seung-Il, Kim Soo-Myun, Yang Tae-Young, Yoo Won-chul
- Judo – Men's 66 kg : Kim Kwang-Sub
- Judo – Women's 57 kg : Kang Sin-Young
- Judo – Women's +78 kg : Kim Na-Young
- Rowing – Women's coxless four : Kim Soon-Rye, Im Eun-Seon, Eom Mi-Seon, Min Su-Hyun
- Sailing – Men's laser : Kim Ho-Gon
- Sailing – Beneteau 7.5 : Yoon Cheul, Kim Tae-Jung, Kim Hyeong-Tae, Kim Sang-Suk
- Sepaktakraw – Women's team : Lee Myung-Eun, Park Keum-Duk, Jung Ji-Yung, Ahn Soon-Ok, Jeong In-Seon, Yu Yeong-Sim, Kim Hee-Jin, Park Na-Yeon, Song Jung-A, Kim Mi-Jeong
- Shooting – Men's 10m air pistol : Jin Jong-oh
- Shooting – Men's 10m air rifle : Yu Jae-Chul
- Shooting – Women's 10m air pistol : Kim Byung-Hee
- Shooting – Women's 25m pistol : Kim Byung-Hee
- Shooting – Women's 50m rifle 3-positions : Na Yoon-Kyung
- Shooting – Women's double trap : Lee Bo-Na
- Shooting – Men's 50m pistol team : Jin Jong-oh, Kim Young-Wook, Lee Sang-Do
- Shooting – Women's 10m air pistol team : Boo Soon-Hee, Kim Byung-Hee, Lee Ho-Lim
- Shooting – Women's skeet team : Kim Yeon-Hee, Kwak Yu-Hyun, Son Hye-Kyung
- Shooting – Women's trap team : Lee Bo-Na, Lee Jung-A, Lee Myung-Ae
- Soft tennis – Men's singles : Nam Taek-Ho
- Soft tennis – Men's team : Jeong Young-Pal, Wi Hyu-Hwan, Kim Jae-Bok, Nam Taek-Ho, Yoo Young-Dong
- Soft tennis – Women's doubles : Lee Kyung-Pyo, Kim Kyung-Ryun
- Swimming – Men's 50 m backstroke : Sung Min
- Swimming – Men's 200 m individual medley : Han Kyu-Chul
- Swimming – Men's 400 m individual medley : Han Kyu-Chul
- Swimming – Women's 400 m freestyle : Lee Ji-Eun
- Swimming – Women's 100 m breaststroke : Baek Su-Yeon
- Swimming – Women's 200 m breaststroke : Jung Seul-Ki
- Swimming – Men's 4 × 100 m freestyle relay : Lim Nam-Gyun, Han Kyu-Chul, Sung Min, Park Tae-Hwan
- Swimming – Men's 4 × 200 m freestyle relay : Lim Nam-Gyun, Han Kyu-Chul, Kang Yong-Hwan, Park Tae-Hwan
- Swimming – Men's 4 × 100 m medley relay : Jeong Doo-Hee, Park Tae-Hwan, Sung Min, You Seung-Hun
- Swimming – Women's 4 × 200 m freestyle relay : Jung Yoo-Jin, Lee Ji-Eun, Lee Keo-Ra, Park Na-Ri
- Swimming – Women's 4 × 100 m medley relay : Jung Seul-Ki, Lee Nam-Eun, Ryu Yoon-Ji, Shin Hae-In
- Table tennis – Men's singles : Ryu Seung-Min
- Table tennis – Women's team : Kim Kyung-Ah, Moon Hyun-Jung, Lee Eun-Hee, Park Mi-Young, Kwak Bang-Bang
- Table tennis – Mixed doubles : Joo Se-Hyuk, Kim Kyung-Ah
- Taekwondo – Women's 72 kg : Lee In-Jong
- Tennis – Men's doubles : Jeon Woong-Sun, Kim Sun-yong
- Weightlifting – Men's 56 kg : Lee Jong-Hoon
- Weightlifting – Men's 69 kg : Kim Sun-Bae
- Weightlifting – Men's 85 kg : Kim Seon-Jong
- Weightlifting – Women's 69 kg : Kim Mi-Kyung
- Wrestling – Men's freestyle 55 kg : Kim Hyo-Sub
- Wrestling – Men's freestyle 84 kg : No Je-Hyun
- Wrestling – Men's freestyle 120 kg : Lee Se-Hyung
- Wushu – Men's taolu nanquan : Lee Seung-Kyoon
- Wushu – Men's sanshou 56 kg : Kim Jun-Yeol
- Wushu – Men's sanshou 70 kg : Ahn Yong-Woon
