= Handball at the 2008 Summer Olympics – Women's tournament =

2008 Women's Olympic handball tournament
Tournament details
- Host country: China
- Venue(s): 2 (in 1 host city)
- Dates: 9–23 August 2008
- Teams: 12 (from 4 confederations)

Final positions
- Champions: Norway (1st title)
- Runner-up: Russia
- Third place: South Korea
- Fourth place: Hungary

Tournament statistics
- Matches played: 42
- Top scorer(s): (Romania) Ramona Maier (56 goals)

The women's handball tournament at the 2008 Summer Olympics is being held from August 9 to August 23, at the Olympic Sports Centre Gymnasium and National Indoor Stadium in Beijing. Twelve nations are represented in the women's tournament.

The four best teams from each group will advance to the quarterfinal round, 5th and 6th teams in each group are classified 9th-12th by the results of their group matches. The losers of quarterfinal matches will compete in the 5th-8th classification matches by the same elimination system as the winners of the quarterfinals. Three time consecutive defending Champion Denmark were not part of the 2008 Olympics Handball Tournament, as they did not qualify from the 2007 World Women's Handball Championship.

== Qualification ==
Competition	Date	Venue	Vacancies	Qualified
Host Nation	-	-	1	China
IHF World Championships	December 2–16, 2007	France	1	Russia
European Championships	December 7–17, 2006	Sweden	1	Norway
Asian Qualifying Tournament	August 25–29, 2007	(Kazakhstan) Almaty	1	Kazakhstan
Africa Nations Cup	January 8–17, 2008	(Angola) Luanda	1	Angola
Pan American Games	July 14–29, 2007	(Brazil) Rio de Janeiro	1	Brazil
Olympic Qualifying Tournament 1	March 28–30, 2008	(Germany) Leipzig	2	Germany; Sweden
Olympic Qualifying Tournament 2	March 28–30, 2008	(Romania) Bucharest	2	Romania; Hungary
Olympic Qualifying Tournament 3	March 28–30, 2008	(France) Nîmes	2	France; South Korea
TOTAL			12	

Olympic Qualifying Tournaments:

- Tournament I:
  - Worlds 3rd: Germany
  - Worlds 9th: Croatia
  - Europe: Sweden
  - Pan-America: Cuba
- Tournament II:
  - Worlds 4th: Romania
  - Worlds 8th: Hungary
  - Asia: Japan
  - Top continent at the Worlds (Europe): Poland
- Tournament III:
  - Worlds 5th: France
  - Worlds 6th: South Korea
  - Africa: Ivory Coast
  - 2nd continent at the Worlds (Asia): Congo

== Preliminary round ==
=== Seeding ===
The draw for the groups was held 16 June 2008.

Pot 1	Pot 2	Pot 3	Pot 4	Pot 5	Pot 6
Russia	Germany	France	South Korea	Angola	Kazakhstan
Norway	Romania	Hungary	China	Sweden	Brazil

== Group stage ==
=== Group A ===
Team	Pld	W	D	L	GF	GA	GD	Pts	Qualification
Norway	5	5	0	0	154	106	+48	10	Qualified for the quarterfinals
Romania	5	4	0	1	150	112	+38	8	Qualified for the quarterfinals
China	5	2	0	3	122	135	−13	4	Qualified for the quarterfinals
France	5	2	0	3	121	128	−7	4	Qualified for the quarterfinals
Kazakhstan	5	1	1	3	109	137	−28	3	
Angola	5	0	1	4	109	147	−38	1	

9 August 2008; 09:00	France	32 – 21	Angola	Olympic Sports Centre Gymnasium; Referees: Chernega, Poladenko (RUS)
9 August 2008; 09:00	Herbrecht 8	(13–14)	Bengue, Almeida 5	Olympic Sports Centre Gymnasium; Referees: Chernega, Poladenko (RUS)
9 August 2008; 09:00	3× (yellow card) 4× (suspension)	Report	3× (yellow card) 3× (suspension)	Olympic Sports Centre Gymnasium; Referees: Chernega, Poladenko (RUS)

9 August 2008; 14:00	Romania	31 – 19	Kazakhstan	Olympic Sports Centre Gymnasium; Referees: Aires Menezes, Aparecido Pinto (BRA)
9 August 2008; 14:00	Ardean-Elisei 6	(13–10)	Ajiderskaya 10	Olympic Sports Centre Gymnasium; Referees: Aires Menezes, Aparecido Pinto (BRA)
9 August 2008; 14:00	4× (yellow card) 5× (suspension) 1× (red card)	Report	3× (yellow card) 7× (suspension)	Olympic Sports Centre Gymnasium; Referees: Aires Menezes, Aparecido Pinto (BRA)

9 August 2008; 19:00	Norway	30 – 23	China	Olympic Sports Centre Gymnasium; Referees: Elmoamli, Shaban Ali (EGY)
9 August 2008; 19:00	Hammerseng 7	(13–12)	Li Weiwei 8	Olympic Sports Centre Gymnasium; Referees: Elmoamli, Shaban Ali (EGY)
9 August 2008; 19:00	3× (yellow card) 5× (suspension)	Report	3× (yellow card) 7× (suspension)	Olympic Sports Centre Gymnasium; Referees: Elmoamli, Shaban Ali (EGY)

11 August 2008; 09:00	Kazakhstan	18 – 21	France	Olympic Sports Centre Gymnasium; Referees: Breto, Huelin (ESP)
11 August 2008; 09:00	Ajiderskaya 7	(8–10)	Lacrabère 6	Olympic Sports Centre Gymnasium; Referees: Breto, Huelin (ESP)
11 August 2008; 09:00	3× (yellow card) 4× (suspension) 1× (red card)	Report	3× (yellow card) 3× (suspension)	Olympic Sports Centre Gymnasium; Referees: Breto, Huelin (ESP)

11 August 2008; 14:00	Angola	17 – 31	Norway	Olympic Sports Centre Gymnasium; Referees: Liu S, Liu F (CHN)
11 August 2008; 14:00	Almeida 5	(6–14)	Riegelhuth 6	Olympic Sports Centre Gymnasium; Referees: Liu S, Liu F (CHN)
11 August 2008; 14:00	3× (yellow card) 3× (suspension)	Report	3× (yellow card) 2× (suspension)	Olympic Sports Centre Gymnasium; Referees: Liu S, Liu F (CHN)

11 August 2008; 19:00	China	20 – 34	Romania	Olympic Sports Centre Gymnasium; Referees: Liudownyk, Vakula (UKR)
11 August 2008; 19:00	Wei Qiuxiang 6	(11–17)	Amariei 9	Olympic Sports Centre Gymnasium; Referees: Liudownyk, Vakula (UKR)
11 August 2008; 19:00	3× (yellow card) 3× (suspension)	Report	3× (yellow card) 5× (suspension)	Olympic Sports Centre Gymnasium; Referees: Liudownyk, Vakula (UKR)

13 August 2008; 10:45	Romania	34 – 26	France	Olympic Sports Centre Gymnasium; Referees: Lemme, Ullrich (GER)
13 August 2008; 10:45	Maier 11	(17–13)	Tervel 6	Olympic Sports Centre Gymnasium; Referees: Lemme, Ullrich (GER)
13 August 2008; 10:45	3× (yellow card) 3× (suspension)	Report	3× (yellow card) 4× (suspension)	Olympic Sports Centre Gymnasium; Referees: Lemme, Ullrich (GER)

13 August 2008; 15:45	China	32 – 24	Angola	Olympic Sports Centre Gymnasium; Referees: Canbro, Claesson (SWE)
13 August 2008; 15:45	Liu Xiaomei 7	(14–12)	Almeida 8	Olympic Sports Centre Gymnasium; Referees: Canbro, Claesson (SWE)
13 August 2008; 15:45	3× (yellow card) 5× (suspension) 1× (red card)	Report	4× (yellow card) 2× (suspension)	Olympic Sports Centre Gymnasium; Referees: Canbro, Claesson (SWE)

13 August 2008; 19:00	Norway	35 – 19	Kazakhstan	Olympic Sports Centre Gymnasium; Referees: Aires Menezes, Aparecido Pinto (BRA)
13 August 2008; 19:00	Lybekk, Nyberg 5	(14–10)	Vassilyeva 6	Olympic Sports Centre Gymnasium; Referees: Aires Menezes, Aparecido Pinto (BRA)
13 August 2008; 19:00	3× (yellow card) 3× (suspension)	Report	3× (yellow card) 5× (suspension)	Olympic Sports Centre Gymnasium; Referees: Aires Menezes, Aparecido Pinto (BRA)

15 August 2008; 09:00	Kazakhstan	29 – 26	China	Olympic Sports Centre Gymnasium; Referees: Lemme, Ullrich (GER)
15 August 2008; 09:00	Pikalova 8	(14–10)	Li Weiwei 11	Olympic Sports Centre Gymnasium; Referees: Lemme, Ullrich (GER)
15 August 2008; 09:00	3× (yellow card) 5× (suspension)	Report	3× (yellow card) 3× (suspension)	Olympic Sports Centre Gymnasium; Referees: Lemme, Ullrich (GER)

15 August 2008; 15:45	Romania	28 – 23	Angola	Olympic Sports Centre Gymnasium; Referees: Aires Menezes, Aparecido Pinto (BRA)
15 August 2008; 15:45	Maier 7	(16–7)	Almeida 8	Olympic Sports Centre Gymnasium; Referees: Aires Menezes, Aparecido Pinto (BRA)
15 August 2008; 15:45	2× (yellow card) 3× (suspension)	Report	3× (yellow card) 2× (suspension)	Olympic Sports Centre Gymnasium; Referees: Aires Menezes, Aparecido Pinto (BRA)

15 August 2008; 19:00	France	24 – 34	Norway	Olympic Sports Centre Gymnasium; Referees: Krstic, Ljubic (SLO)
15 August 2008; 19:00	Baudouin 6	(12–15)	Nyberg, Riegelhuth 6	Olympic Sports Centre Gymnasium; Referees: Krstic, Ljubic (SLO)
15 August 2008; 19:00	3× (yellow card) 4× (suspension)	Report	3× (yellow card) 3× (suspension)	Olympic Sports Centre Gymnasium; Referees: Krstic, Ljubic (SLO)

17 August 2008; 10:45	Angola	24 – 24	Kazakhstan	Olympic Sports Centre Gymnasium; Referees: Din, Dinu (ROU)
17 August 2008; 10:45	Bengue 6	(16–14)	three players 5	Olympic Sports Centre Gymnasium; Referees: Din, Dinu (ROU)
17 August 2008; 10:45	3× (yellow card) 5× (suspension)	Report	3× (yellow card) 5× (suspension)	Olympic Sports Centre Gymnasium; Referees: Din, Dinu (ROU)

17 August 2008; 14:00	Norway	24 – 23	Romania	Olympic Sports Centre Gymnasium; Referees: Chernega, Poladenko (RUS)
17 August 2008; 14:00	Johansen, Lybekk 4	(12–11)	Amariei, Stanca-Gâlcă 5	Olympic Sports Centre Gymnasium; Referees: Chernega, Poladenko (RUS)
17 August 2008; 14:00	2× (yellow card) 4× (suspension)	Report	4× (yellow card) 6× (suspension) 1× (red card)	Olympic Sports Centre Gymnasium; Referees: Chernega, Poladenko (RUS)

17 August 2008; 15:45	France	18 – 21	China	Olympic Sports Centre Gymnasium; Referees: Liudowyk, Vakula (UKR)
17 August 2008; 15:45	Ayglon 5	(10–9)	Wu Wenjuan 5	Olympic Sports Centre Gymnasium; Referees: Liudowyk, Vakula (UKR)
17 August 2008; 15:45	3× (yellow card) 2× (suspension)	Report	3× (yellow card) 6× (suspension)	Olympic Sports Centre Gymnasium; Referees: Liudowyk, Vakula (UKR)

=== Group B ===
Team	Pld	W	D	L	GF	GA	GD	Pts	Qualification
Russia	5	4	1	0	148	125	+23	9	Qualified for the quarterfinals
South Korea	5	3	1	1	155	127	+28	7	Qualified for the quarterfinals
Hungary	5	2	1	2	129	142	−13	5	Qualified for the quarterfinals
Sweden	5	2	0	3	123	137	−14	4	Qualified for the quarterfinals
Brazil	5	1	1	3	124	137	−13	3	
Germany	5	1	0	4	123	134	−11	2	

9 August 2008; 10:45	Hungary	30 – 24	Sweden	Olympic Sports Centre Gymnasium; Referees: Licis, Stolarovs (LAT)
9 August 2008; 10:45	Vérten, Görbicz 7	(15–14)	Islas Helgesson 6	Olympic Sports Centre Gymnasium; Referees: Licis, Stolarovs (LAT)
9 August 2008; 10:45	2× (yellow card) 7× (suspension)	Report	2× (yellow card) 4× (suspension)	Olympic Sports Centre Gymnasium; Referees: Licis, Stolarovs (LAT)

9 August 2008; 15:45	Russia	29 – 29	South Korea	Olympic Sports Centre Gymnasium; Referees: Gjeding, Hansen (DEN)
9 August 2008; 15:45	Marennikova 6	(16–13)	Kim On-a 7	Olympic Sports Centre Gymnasium; Referees: Gjeding, Hansen (DEN)
9 August 2008; 15:45	3× (yellow card) 5× (suspension)	Report	2× (yellow card) 2× (suspension)	Olympic Sports Centre Gymnasium; Referees: Gjeding, Hansen (DEN)

9 August 2008; 20:45	Germany	24 – 22	Brazil	Olympic Sports Centre Gymnasium; Referees: Breto, Huelin (ESP)
9 August 2008; 20:45	Krause 6	(11–12)	Santos 6	Olympic Sports Centre Gymnasium; Referees: Breto, Huelin (ESP)
9 August 2008; 20:45	3× (yellow card) 2× (suspension)	Report	3× (yellow card) 2× (suspension)	Olympic Sports Centre Gymnasium; Referees: Breto, Huelin (ESP)

11 August 2008; 10:45	Brazil	28 – 28	Hungary	Olympic Sports Centre Gymnasium; Referees: Baum, Goralczyk (POL)
11 August 2008; 10:45	Amorim 10	(12–17)	Görbicz 8	Olympic Sports Centre Gymnasium; Referees: Baum, Goralczyk (POL)
11 August 2008; 10:45	3× (yellow card) 6× (suspension)	Report	3× (yellow card) 6× (suspension) 1× (red card)	Olympic Sports Centre Gymnasium; Referees: Baum, Goralczyk (POL)

11 August 2008; 15:45	South Korea	30 – 20	Germany	Olympic Sports Centre Gymnasium; Referees: Krstic, Ljubic (SLO)
11 August 2008; 15:45	Hong Jeong-ho 6	(12–9)	Jurack, Loerper 4	Olympic Sports Centre Gymnasium; Referees: Krstic, Ljubic (SLO)
11 August 2008; 15:45	3× (yellow card) 6× (suspension)	Report	3× (yellow card) 3× (suspension)	Olympic Sports Centre Gymnasium; Referees: Krstic, Ljubic (SLO)

11 August 2008; 20:45	Sweden	24 – 28	Russia	Olympic Sports Centre Gymnasium; Referees: Din, Dinu (ROU)
11 August 2008; 20:45	Wiel Fredén 6	(12–14)	Turei 6	Olympic Sports Centre Gymnasium; Referees: Din, Dinu (ROU)
11 August 2008; 20:45	4× (yellow card) 4× (suspension)	Report	3× (yellow card) 4× (suspension)	Olympic Sports Centre Gymnasium; Referees: Din, Dinu (ROU)

13 August 2008; 09:00	Russia	28 – 19	Brazil	Olympic Sports Centre Gymnasium; Referees: Licis, Stolarovs (LAT)
13 August 2008; 09:00	Poltoratskaya 6	(12–10)	Nascimento 5	Olympic Sports Centre Gymnasium; Referees: Licis, Stolarovs (LAT)
13 August 2008; 09:00	2× (yellow card) 4× (suspension)	Report	3× (yellow card) 2× (suspension)	Olympic Sports Centre Gymnasium; Referees: Licis, Stolarovs (LAT)

13 August 2008; 14:00	South Korea	31 – 23	Sweden	Olympic Sports Centre Gymnasium; Referees: Baum, Goralczyk (POL)
13 August 2008; 14:00	An, Park 7	(18–13)	Ahlm, Boson 6	Olympic Sports Centre Gymnasium; Referees: Baum, Goralczyk (POL)
13 August 2008; 14:00	3× (yellow card) 1× (suspension) 1× (red card)	Report	4× (yellow card) 6× (suspension)	Olympic Sports Centre Gymnasium; Referees: Baum, Goralczyk (POL)

13 August 2008; 20:45	Germany	24 – 25	Hungary	Olympic Sports Centre Gymnasium; Referees: Gjeding, Hansen (DEN)
13 August 2008; 20:45	Krause 9	(14–12)	Görbicz 9	Olympic Sports Centre Gymnasium; Referees: Gjeding, Hansen (DEN)
13 August 2008; 20:45	3× (yellow card) 4× (suspension)	Report	4× (yellow card) 7× (suspension)	Olympic Sports Centre Gymnasium; Referees: Gjeding, Hansen (DEN)

15 August 2008; 10:45	Brazil	33 – 32	South Korea	Olympic Sports Centre Gymnasium; Referees: Licis, Stolarovs (LAT)
15 August 2008; 10:45	Nascimento 9	(17–12)	Hong Jeong-ho 10	Olympic Sports Centre Gymnasium; Referees: Licis, Stolarovs (LAT)
15 August 2008; 10:45	4× (yellow card) 6× (suspension)	Report	3× (yellow card) 5× (suspension) 1× (red card)	Olympic Sports Centre Gymnasium; Referees: Licis, Stolarovs (LAT)

15 August 2008; 14:00	Germany	26 – 27	Sweden	Olympic Sports Centre Gymnasium; Referees: Bord, Buy (FRA)
15 August 2008; 14:00	Althaus, Wörz 5	(13–13)	Ahlm 7	Olympic Sports Centre Gymnasium; Referees: Bord, Buy (FRA)
15 August 2008; 14:00	2× (yellow card) 4× (suspension) 1× (red card)	Report	4× (yellow card) 4× (suspension)	Olympic Sports Centre Gymnasium; Referees: Bord, Buy (FRA)

15 August 2008; 20:45	Hungary	24 – 33	Russia	Olympic Sports Centre Gymnasium; Referees: Din, Dinu (ROU)
15 August 2008; 20:45	Görbicz 6	(15–16)	Postnova 8	Olympic Sports Centre Gymnasium; Referees: Din, Dinu (ROU)
15 August 2008; 20:45	3× (yellow card) 3× (suspension)	Report	3× (yellow card) 2× (suspension)	Olympic Sports Centre Gymnasium; Referees: Din, Dinu (ROU)

17 August 2008; 09:00	Sweden	25 – 22	Brazil	Olympic Sports Centre Gymnasium; Referees: Bord, Buy (FRA)
17 August 2008; 09:00	Ahlm 7	(14–11)	Rosas 5	Olympic Sports Centre Gymnasium; Referees: Bord, Buy (FRA)
17 August 2008; 09:00	3× (yellow card) 3× (suspension)	Report	2× (yellow card) 4× (suspension)	Olympic Sports Centre Gymnasium; Referees: Bord, Buy (FRA)

17 August 2008; 19:00	Russia	30 – 29	Germany	Olympic Sports Centre Gymnasium; Referees: Gjeding, Hansen (DEN)
17 August 2008; 19:00	Postnova 8	(16–14)	Wörz 8	Olympic Sports Centre Gymnasium; Referees: Gjeding, Hansen (DEN)
17 August 2008; 19:00	2× (yellow card) 4× (suspension)	Report	3× (yellow card) 3× (suspension)	Olympic Sports Centre Gymnasium; Referees: Gjeding, Hansen (DEN)

17 August 2008; 20:45	Hungary	22 – 33	South Korea	Olympic Sports Centre Gymnasium; Referees: Breto, Huelin (ESP)
17 August 2008; 20:45	Görbicz 7	(11–19)	Oh Seong-ok 6	Olympic Sports Centre Gymnasium; Referees: Breto, Huelin (ESP)
17 August 2008; 20:45	4× (yellow card) 5× (suspension)	Report	3× (yellow card) 3× (suspension)	Olympic Sports Centre Gymnasium; Referees: Breto, Huelin (ESP)

== Medal Round ==
All times are China Standard Time (UTC+8)

Quarterfinals
A2	Romania	30
B3	Hungary	34
B1	Russia(2OT)	32
A4	France	31
B2	South Korea	31
A3	China	23
A1	Norway	31
B4	Sweden	24

Semifinals
B3	Hungary	20
B1	Russia	22
B2	South Korea	28
A1	Norway	29

Gold medal game
Russia	27
Norway	34
Bronze medal game
South Korea	33
4	Hungary	28

=== Quarterfinals ===
19 August 2008; 12:00	Norway	31 – 24	Sweden	Olympic Sports Centre Gymnasium; Referees: Baum, Goralczyk (POL)
19 August 2008; 12:00	Larsen, Lybekk 6	(16–10)	Torstenson 6	Olympic Sports Centre Gymnasium; Referees: Baum, Goralczyk (POL)
19 August 2008; 12:00	3× (yellow card) 4× (suspension)	Report	4× (yellow card) 2× (suspension)	Olympic Sports Centre Gymnasium; Referees: Baum, Goralczyk (POL)

19 August 2008; 14:15	Romania	30 – 34	Hungary	Olympic Sports Centre Gymnasium; Referees: Liudowyk, Vakula (UKR)
19 August 2008; 14:15	Maier 11	(14–16)	Kovacsicz 7	Olympic Sports Centre Gymnasium; Referees: Liudowyk, Vakula (UKR)
19 August 2008; 14:15	3× (yellow card) 7× (suspension) 1× (red card)	Report	3× (yellow card) 2× (suspension)	Olympic Sports Centre Gymnasium; Referees: Liudowyk, Vakula (UKR)

19 August 2008; 18:00	South Korea	31 – 23	China	Olympic Sports Centre Gymnasium; Referees: Aires, Aparecido (BRA)
19 August 2008; 18:00	Park Chung-hee 8	(16–12)	Huang Dongjie 5	Olympic Sports Centre Gymnasium; Referees: Aires, Aparecido (BRA)
19 August 2008; 18:00	3× (yellow card) 4× (suspension)	Report	4× (yellow card) 1× (suspension)	Olympic Sports Centre Gymnasium; Referees: Aires, Aparecido (BRA)

19 August 2008
20:15
Russia
32 – 31 (ET)
France
Olympic Sports Centre Gymnasium
Referees: Liu S, Liu F (CHN)
Bliznova 6
(12–16)
Signaté 7
4× (yellow card) 2× (suspension)
Report
4× (yellow card) 4× (suspension)

FT: 24–24 ET: 4–4, 4–3

=== Classification ===
21 August 2008; 12:00	Sweden	19 – 20	China	Beijing National Indoor Stadium; Referees: Karbaschi, Kolahdouzan (IRI)
21 August 2008; 12:00	Torstenson 6	(7–8)	Wang Shasha 5	Beijing National Indoor Stadium; Referees: Karbaschi, Kolahdouzan (IRI)
21 August 2008; 12:00	4× (yellow card) 5× (suspension)	Report	3× (yellow card) 3× (suspension)	Beijing National Indoor Stadium; Referees: Karbaschi, Kolahdouzan (IRI)

21 August 2008
14:15
Romania
34 – 36 (ET)
France
Beijing National Indoor Stadium
Referees: Līcis, Stoļarovs (LAT)
Maier 9
(13–12)
Baudouin 7
4× (yellow card) 8× (suspension)
Report
4× (yellow card) 8× (suspension)

FT: 27–27 ET: 4–4, 3–5

=== Semifinals ===
21 August 2008; 18:00	Norway	29 – 28	South Korea	Beijing National Indoor Stadium; Referees: Breto, Huelin (ESP)
21 August 2008; 18:00	Hammerseng, Johansen 6	(14–15)	Moon Pil-hee 9	Beijing National Indoor Stadium; Referees: Breto, Huelin (ESP)
21 August 2008; 18:00	2× (yellow card) 3× (suspension)	Report	3× (yellow card) 2× (suspension)	Beijing National Indoor Stadium; Referees: Breto, Huelin (ESP)

21 August 2008; 20:15	Hungary	20 – 22	Russia	Beijing National Indoor Stadium; Referees: Baum, Goralczyk (POL)
21 August 2008; 20:15	Tóth 5	(9–14)	Bliznova 7	Beijing National Indoor Stadium; Referees: Baum, Goralczyk (POL)
21 August 2008; 20:15	4× (yellow card) 6× (suspension)	Report	3× (yellow card) 7× (suspension) 1× (red card)	Beijing National Indoor Stadium; Referees: Baum, Goralczyk (POL)

=== 7th–8th place ===
23 August 2008; 08:00	Sweden	30 – 34	Romania	Beijing National Indoor Stadium; Referees: Elmoamli, Shaban Ali (EGY)
23 August 2008; 08:00	Gulldén 9	(15–17)	Meirosu, Stanca-Gâlcă 6	Beijing National Indoor Stadium; Referees: Elmoamli, Shaban Ali (EGY)
23 August 2008; 08:00	4× (yellow card) 4× (suspension)	Report	3× (yellow card) 2× (suspension)	Beijing National Indoor Stadium; Referees: Elmoamli, Shaban Ali (EGY)

=== 5th–6th place ===
23 August 2008; 10:15	China	23 – 31	France	Beijing National Indoor Stadium; Referees: Krstic, Ljubic (SLO)
23 August 2008; 10:15	Liu Yun 7	(10–15)	Herbrecht, Pecqueux-Rolland 7	Beijing National Indoor Stadium; Referees: Krstic, Ljubic (SLO)
23 August 2008; 10:15	3× (yellow card) 1× (suspension)	Report	3× (yellow card) 1× (suspension)	Beijing National Indoor Stadium; Referees: Krstic, Ljubic (SLO)

=== Bronze medal match ===
23 August 2008; 13:30	South Korea	33 – 28	Hungary	Beijing National Indoor Stadium; Referees: Chernega, Poladenko (RUS)
23 August 2008; 13:30	Moon Pil-hee 10	(13–15)	Ferling 7	Beijing National Indoor Stadium; Referees: Chernega, Poladenko (RUS)
23 August 2008; 13:30	3× (yellow card) 3× (suspension)	Report	3× (yellow card) 7× (suspension)	Beijing National Indoor Stadium; Referees: Chernega, Poladenko (RUS)

=== Gold medal match ===
23 August 2008; 15:45	Norway	34 – 27	Russia	Beijing National Indoor Stadium; Referees: Bord, Buy (FRA)
23 August 2008; 15:45	Riegelhuth 9	(18–13)	Bliznova 6	Beijing National Indoor Stadium; Referees: Bord, Buy (FRA)
23 August 2008; 15:45	3× (yellow card) 3× (suspension)	Report	2× (yellow card) 2× (suspension)	Beijing National Indoor Stadium; Referees: Bord, Buy (FRA)

== Rankings and statistics ==
Classification
1st place, gold medalist(s)	Norway
2nd place, silver medalist(s)	Russia
3rd place, bronze medalist(s)	South Korea
4	Hungary
5	France
6	China
7	Romania
8	Sweden
9	Brazil
10	Kazakhstan
11	Germany
12	Angola

=== All Star Team ===
- Goalkeeper: (Norway) Katrine Lunde Haraldsen
- Left wing: (Hungary) Orsolya Vérten
- Left back: (Russia) Liudmila Postnova
- Centre back: (South Korea) Oh Seong-Ok
- Right back: (Russia) Irina Bliznova
- Right wing: (Romania) Ramona Maier
- Line player/pivot: (Norway) Else-Marthe Sørlie Lybekk

Chosen by team officials and IHF experts: IHF.info

=== Top Goalkeepers ===
Rank	Name	Team	%	Saves	Shots
1	Katrine Lunde Haraldsen	Norway	42%	120	283
2	Amandine Leynaud	France	40%	38	96
2	Valérie Nicolas	France	40%	105	264
4	Luminiţa Dinu-Huţupan	Romania	39%	97	248
5	Lee Min-Hee	South Korea	38%	36	95
6	Inna Suslina	Russia	37%	59	158
7	Oh Yong-Ran	South Korea	36%	83	231
7	Clara Woltering	Germany	36%	44	121
9	Sabine Englert	Germany	34%	30	87
10	Katalin Pálinger	Hungary	33%	108	323

=== Top goalscorers ===
Rank	Name	Team	Goals	Shots	%
1	Ramona Maier	Romania	56	78	72%
2	Anita Görbicz	Hungary	49	105	47%
3	Hong Jeong-ho	South Korea	44	66	67%
4	Moon Pil-Hee	South Korea	42	83	51%
5	Johanna Ahlm	Sweden	40	95	42%
6	Park Chung-Hee	South Korea	37	62	60%
6	Liudmila Postnova	Russia	37	76	49%
8	Irina Bliznova	Russia	36	70	51%
9	Liu Yun	China	35	49	71%
10	Ionela Stanca-Gâlcă	Romania	33	41	80%
10	Linnea Torstenson	Sweden	33	90	37%
