= Handball at the 2002 Asian Games – Women's tournament =

Women at the 2002 Asian Games
- Venue: Changwon Gymnasium
- Date: 1–12 October 2002
- Competitors: 79 from 5 nations

Medalists
gold medal	South Korea
silver medal	Kazakhstan
bronze medal	China

Women's handball at the 2002 Asian Games was held in Changwon Gymnasium, Changwon, South Korea from October 1 to October 12, 2002.

== Squads ==
China	Japan	Kazakhstan	North Korea
Wang Xiaojiong; Zhai Chao; Liu Yun; Li Bing; Shi Wei; Li Yang; Chen Haiyun; Zhu Hongxia; Wu Yanan; Liu Xiaomei; Che Zhihong; Yu Geli; Zhao Ying; Li Weiwei; Li Xin	Michiko Yamashita; Chizuko Kawamoto; Mie Fujiura; Akane Aoto; Mineko Tanaka; Masayo Oishi; Kiho Inayoshi; Hitomi Sakugawa; Yukari Asai; Akiko Kinjo; Eiko Yamada; Naomi Nakamura; Mami Tanaka; Aiko Hayafune; Tomoko Sakamoto; Maki Hadeshige	Olga Travnikova; Yelena Kozlova; Olga Zolina; Irina Borechko; Marina Buzmakova; Svetlana Grasmik; Lyazzat Kilibayeva; Olga Yegunova; Liliya Zubkova; Lyudmila Sidorenko; Natalya Kubrina; Irina Lang; Natalya Shapovalova; Irina Melnikova; Yuliya Puzanova; Olga Adzhiderskaya	Rim Kil-hwa; Pak Song-ok; Ri Hyon-sil; Kim Sun-sil; Yun Kyong-ok; Ko Won-suk; Hong Sun-hui; Im Un-song; Ri Jong-sim; Kim Kyong-hui; Pak Chun-bok; Kim Tong-suk; Ri Hui-yong; Sin Ok-son; Yun Yong-sun; Kim Il-sim
South Korea			
Lee Nam-soo; Kim Hyang-ki; Huh Soon-young; Kim Eun-gyung; Jang So-hee; Kim Hyun-ok; Kim Cha-youn; Lee Seul-hee; Huh Young-sook; Moon Kyeong-ha; Kim Cheong-sim; Chung Eun-hee; Woo Sun-hee; Son Myung-hee; Myoung Bok-hee; Choi Im-jeong			

== Results ==
All times are Korea Standard Time (UTC+09:00)

Pos	Team	Pld	W	D	L	GF	GA	GD	Pts
1	South Korea	4	4	0	0	116	83	+33	8
2	Kazakhstan	4	2	1	1	104	98	+6	5
3	China	4	1	2	1	100	96	+4	4
4	Japan	4	0	2	2	90	109	−19	2
5	North Korea	4	0	1	3	99	123	−24	1

Source: Results

1 October; 13:00	South Korea	28–21	Japan	Changwon Gymnasium, Changwon; Referees: Al-Mulla, Al-Zarraa (QAT)
1 October; 13:00	Kim E. 5	(13–12)	Kinjo 5	Changwon Gymnasium, Changwon; Referees: Al-Mulla, Al-Zarraa (QAT)

1 October; 15:00	China	24–24	Kazakhstan	Changwon Gymnasium, Changwon; Referees: Abbas, Haider (KUW)
1 October; 15:00	Li Y. 8	(12–13)	Kubrina 10	Changwon Gymnasium, Changwon; Referees: Abbas, Haider (KUW)

3 October; 13:00	South Korea	28–19	Kazakhstan	Changwon Gymnasium, Changwon; Referees: Al-Mulla, Al-Zarraa (QAT)
3 October; 13:00	Choi 9	(13–9)	Kozlova 4	Changwon Gymnasium, Changwon; Referees: Al-Mulla, Al-Zarraa (QAT)

3 October; 15:00	Japan	26–26	North Korea	Changwon Gymnasium, Changwon; Referees: Abbas, Haider (KUW)
3 October; 15:00	Tanaka, Sakugawa 6	(14–12)	Ri H.Y. 11	Changwon Gymnasium, Changwon; Referees: Abbas, Haider (KUW)

5 October; 15:00	China	34–23	North Korea	Changwon Gymnasium, Changwon; Referees: Hamada, Ogasawara (JPN)
5 October; 15:00	Zhao 11	(13–12)	Kim K. 7	Changwon Gymnasium, Changwon; Referees: Hamada, Ogasawara (JPN)

7 October; 13:00	South Korea	34–24	North Korea	Changwon Gymnasium, Changwon; Referees: Kouzehgari, Hayatpour (IRI)
7 October; 13:00	Choi 7	(15–16)	Kim K., Ri H.Y. 5	Changwon Gymnasium, Changwon; Referees: Kouzehgari, Hayatpour (IRI)

7 October; 15:00	Japan	20–32	Kazakhstan	Changwon Gymnasium, Changwon; Referees: Abbas, Haider (KUW)
7 October; 15:00	Inayoshi 5	(8–18)	Kubrina 8	Changwon Gymnasium, Changwon; Referees: Abbas, Haider (KUW)

9 October; 13:00	China	23–23	Japan	Changwon Gymnasium, Changwon; Referees: Al-Mulla, Al-Zarraa (QAT)
9 October; 13:00	Zhai 8	(11–9)	Tanaka, Yamada 7	Changwon Gymnasium, Changwon; Referees: Al-Mulla, Al-Zarraa (QAT)

11 October; 14:00	Kazakhstan	29–26	North Korea	Changwon Gymnasium, Changwon; Referees: Kouzehgari, Hayatpour (IRI)
11 October; 14:00	Kubrina 9	(14–13)	Sin 7	Changwon Gymnasium, Changwon; Referees: Kouzehgari, Hayatpour (IRI)

12 October; 14:00	South Korea	26–19	China	Changwon Gymnasium, Changwon; Referees: Hamada, Ogasawara (JPN)
12 October; 14:00	Woo, Choi 7	(10–12)	Zhai 6	Changwon Gymnasium, Changwon; Referees: Hamada, Ogasawara (JPN)

== Final standing ==
Rank	Team	Pld	W	D	L
1st place, gold medalist(s)	South Korea	4	4	0	0
2nd place, silver medalist(s)	Kazakhstan	4	2	1	1
3rd place, bronze medalist(s)	China	4	1	2	1
4	Japan	4	0	2	2
5	North Korea	4	0	1	3
