= Wang Min =

Wang Min may refer to:

- Wang Min (born 1950), former Communist Party Secretary of Liaoning Province, China
- Wang Min (born 1956), politician from Shandong Province and former Party Secretary of Jinan, investigated for corruption
- Wang Min (handballer) (born 1980), Chinese handball player
- Wang Min (rower) (born 1990), Chinese rower

== See also ==
- Wangmin Township (王民乡), a township in Xiji County, Ningxia, China
- Min Kingdom (907/909–945), a Five Dynasties period state ruled by the Wang family, infrequently referred to as Wang Min (王閩)
- Wang Ming (1904–1974), Chinese Communist leader
