= Kristina Nedopekina =

Kazakhstani handball player

Personal information
- Nationality: Kazakhstani
- Born: June 11, 1989 (age 37)
- Height: 178 cm (70 in)

Sport
- Sport: Handball

Senior clubs
- Years: Team
- –: Zvezda Zvenigorod
National team
- Years: Team
- –: Kazakhstan

Kristina Nedopekina (born 11 June 1989) is a handball player from Kazakhstan. She played on the Kazakhstan women's national handball team, and participated at the 2011 World Women's Handball Championship in Brazil.
