= Klaudia Pielesz =

Polish handball player (born 1988)

Personal information
- Nationality: Polish
- Born: 25 October 1988 (age 37) Jastrzębie-Zdrój, Poland
- Height: 1.90 m (6 ft 3 in)

Sport
- Sport: Handball
- Position: Left back
- Current club: Retired
National team
Years	Team	Apps	(Gls)
–	Poland	77	(165)

Klaudia Pielesz (born 25 October 1988) is a Polish handball player for Zagłębie Lubin and the Polish national team.
