= Rahma Tered =

Tunisian handball player

Rahma Tered (born 28 March 1988 in Sousse) is a Tunisian handball player. She plays on the Tunisian national team, and participated at the 2011 World Women's Handball Championship in Brazil.
