= Camelia Hotea =

Romanian handball player (born 1984)

Personal information
- Nationality: Romanian
- Born: 28 October 1984 (age 41) Baia Mare, Romania
- Height: 1.75 m (5 ft 9 in)

Sport
- Sport: Handball
- Position: Left wing
- Current club: Retired

Senior clubs
- Years: Team
- 2002–2011: HCM Baia Mare
- 2011–2019: Corona Braşov
- 2019–2020: Minaur Baia Mare
National team
Years	Team	Apps	(Gls)
–	Romania	35	(56)

Camelia Hotea (née Balint; born 27 October 1984) is a Romanian retired handballer who last played Minaur Baia Mare.

She was made Honorary Citizen of Baia Mare in 2007.

== Achievements ==
- EHF Challenge Cup:
  - Finalist: 2003
- EHF Cup:
  - Semifinalist: 2016

== Individual awards ==
- HCM Baia Mare's Player of the Year: 2003, 2007
- Maramureș County Sportswoman of the Year: 2007
