= Olga Travnikova =

Kazakhstani handball player (born 1970)

Personal information
- Nationality: Kazakhstani / Russian
- Born: 25 September 1970 (age 56) Alma-Ata, Kazakh SSR, Soviet Union
- Height: 173 cm (68 in)

Sport
- Sport: Handball

Senior clubs
- Years: Team
- –: Rostov-Don
- –: Almaty
National team
- Years: Team
- –: Kazakhstan
- -2005: Russia Beach
Medal record
Asian Games
Silver medal – second place	2002 Changwon
Silver medal – second place	2006 Al-Riyyan

Olga Travnikova (born Vorona, 25 September 1970) is a Kazakhstani-Russian handball goalkeeper. She was born in Almaty. She competed for Russia till 2005. She represented Kazakhstan at the 2008 Summer Olympics in Beijing, where the Kazakhstani team placed 10th.

She represented Russia in Beach handball. In 2004, she became the European champion in beach handball.
