= Katsuhiko Kinoshita =

Japanese team handball coach (born 1973)

Katsuhiko Kinoshita (born 1973) is a Japanese handball coach and former player. He coached the Australian national team, and participated at the 2007 World Women's Handball Championship in France, at the 2009 World Women's Handball Championship in China, as well as the 2011 World Women's Handball Championship in Brazil.

In addition to handball he has also coached rugby at Brisbane Boys' College.
