= Shio Fujii =

Japanese handball player (born 1985)

Personal information
- Nationality: Japanese
- Born: 27 March 1985 (age 41)
- Height: 1.64 m (5 ft 5 in)

Sport
- Sport: Handball
- Position: Right back
- Current club: Osaka Lovvits
- Number: 17
National team
Years	Team	Apps	(Gls)
–	Japan	110	(555)
Medal record
Asian Games
Silver medal – second place	2010 Guangzhou	Team

Shio Fujii (藤井 紫緒, Fujii Shio; born 27 March 1985) is a Japanese handball player who has been captain of the Japan women's national handball team. She is currently playing for the Japanese club of Osaka Lovvits. She was listed among the top ten goalscorers at the 2009 World Women's Handball Championship in China.
