= Aline Rosas =

Brazilian handball player (born 1979)

Personal information
- Full name: Aline Waleska Lopes Rosas
- Born: 28 June 1979 (age 47) João Pessoa, Brazil
- Height: 159 cm (63 in)

Sport
- Sport: Handball

Senior clubs
- Years: Team
- –: A.D. Blu
National team
- Years: Team
- –: Brazil

Aline Waleska "Pará" Lopes Rosas (born 28 June 1979) is a Brazilian handball player.

She was born in João Pessoa, Brazil. She competed at the 2004 Summer Olympics, where Brazil placed 7th. She also competed at the 2008 Summer Olympics, where Brazil placed 9th.
