= Irina Borechko =

Kazakhstani handball player (born 1972)

Personal information
- Nationality: Kazakhstani
- Born: 13 January 1972 (age 54) Alma-Ata, Kazakh SSR, Soviet Union
- Height: 178 cm (70 in)

Sport
- Sport: Handball
National team
- Years: Team
- –: Kazakhstan
Medal record
Asian Games
Silver medal – second place	2002 Changwon
Silver medal – second place	2006 Al-Riyyan

Irina Vikentyevna Borechko (Russian: Ирина Викентьевна Боречко; born 13 January 1972) is a Kazakh handball player. She was born in Almaty. She competed at the 2008 Summer Olympics in Beijing, where the Kazakhstani team placed 10th.

She also played at the 2007 World Women's Handball Championship, which was Kazakhstan's first ever participation. They finished 18th of 24.
