= Yevgeniya Tsupenkova =

Kazakhstani handball player (born 1985)

Personal information
- Nationality: Kazakhstani
- Born: 24 July 1985 (age 41)
- Height: 1.85 m (6 ft 1 in)

Sport
- Sport: Handball
- Position: Goalkeeper
- Current club: Seikhun-KAM Handball
National team
Years	Team	Apps	(Gls)
–	Kazakhstan	18	(0)
Medal record
Asian Games
Silver medal – second place	2006 Al-Riyyan
Bronze medal – third place	2014 Incheon

Yevgeniya Tsupenkova (born 24 July 1985) is a Kazakhstani handball player. She is member of the Kazakhstani national team. She competed at the 2015 World Women's Handball Championship in Denmark.
