= Wang Min (handballer) =

Chinese handball player (born 1980)

Wang Min (Chinese: 王旻; pinyin: Wáng Mín; born June 14, 1980, in Shanghai) is a female Chinese handball player who competed at the 2004 Summer Olympics.

In 2004, she finished eighth with the Chinese team in the women's competition. She played all seven matches and scored 19 goals.
