= Anastassiya Batuyeva =

Kazakhstani handball player (born 1987)

Personal information
- Nationality: Kazakhstani
- Born: September 7, 1987 (age 39)
- Height: 185 cm (73 in)

Sport
- Sport: Handball

Senior clubs
- Years: Team
- –: Kazygurt
- –: HC Astana
National team
- Years: Team
- –: Kazakhstan
Medal record
Asian Games
Silver medal – second place	2006 Al-Riyyan

Anastasiya Batuyeva (Russian: Анастасия Батуева; born 7 September 1987) is a handball player from Kazakhstan. She has played on the Kazakhstan women's national handball team, and played at the 2007 World Women's Handball Championship, which was Kazakhstan's first ever participation. They finished 18th of 24. She also participated at the 2011 World Women's Handball Championship in Brazil.
