= Olga Adzhiderskaya =

Kazakhstani handball player (born 1982)

Personal information
- Nationality: Kazakhstani
- Born: 28 May 1982 (age 44) Kyzylorda, Kazakh SSR, Soviet Union
- Height: 189 cm (74 in)

Sport
- Sport: Handball
- Position: Left back

Senior clubs
- Years: Team
- 1996-1997: SKIF D-Club
- 1997-1998: Seyhun-KAM
- 1999-2005: Dinamo Volgograd
- 2005-2015: Rostov-Don
National team
- Years: Team
- –: Kazakhstan
Medal record
Asian Games
Silver medal – second place	2002 Changwon
Silver medal – second place	2006 Al-Riyyan
Asian Championship
Gold medal – first place	2002 Kazakhstan	'
Gold medal – first place	2010 Kazakhstan

Olga Olegovna Adzhiderskaya (Ольга Аджидерская; born 28 May 1982) is a Kazakhstani handball player. She was born in Kyzylorda. She competed at the 2008 Summer Olympics in Beijing, where the Kazakhstani team placed 10th.

She also won two gold medals at the 2002 and 2010 Asian Women's Handball Championship, which were Kazakhstan's first and second ever title.

== Club Handball ==
Adzhiderskaya played for SKIF D-Club and Seyhun-KAM in her home country, before moving to Russia in 1999. Here she played for Dinamo Volgograd until 2005, and then for Rostov-Don. With Dinamo Volgograd she won the Russian Super League in 2000 and 2001, and with Rostov-Don she won it in 2015.
