= Kwon Geun-hae =

Korean team handball player (born 1987)

Olympic medal record

Asian Games
Gold medal – first place	2006 Doha	Team

- Kwon Geun-hae
- Hangul: 권근혜
- Hanja: 權槿慧
- RR: Gwon Geunhye
- MR: Kwŏn Kŭnhye

Kwon Geun-Hae (born 30 December 1987) is a Korean team handball player. She played on the South Korean national team, and participated at the 2011 World Women's Handball Championship in Brazil.

She also won a gold medal at the 2006 Asian Games.
