= Gulzira Iskakova =

Kazakhstani handball player

Personal information
- Nationality: Kazakhstani
- Born: 4 November 1988 (age 37) Kyzylorda, Kazakh SSR, Soviet Union
- Height: 170 cm (67 in)

Sport
- Sport: Handball

Senior clubs
- Years: Team
- –: Seihun-Kam
National team
- Years: Team
- –: Kazakhstan

Gulzira Iskakova (born 4 November 1988) is a handball player from Kazakhstan. She plays on the Kazakhstan women's national handball team, and played at the 2007 World Women's Handball Championship, which was Kazakhstan's first ever participation. They finished 18th of 24.

She also participated at the 2011 World Women's Handball Championship in Brazil. She competed at the 2008 Summer Olympics in Beijing, where the Kazakhstani team placed 10th.
