= Huh Young-sook =

South Korean handball player (born 1975)

- Hangul: 허영숙
- Hanja: 許英淑
- RR: Heo Yeongsuk
- MR: Hŏ Yŏngsuk

Huh Young-sook
Medal record

Representing South Korea

Women's Handball

Olympic Games
| Silver medal – second place | 2004 Athens | Team |

World Championship
| Bronze medal – third place | 2003 Croatia | Team |

Asian Games
| Gold medal – first place | 1994 Hiroshima | |
| Gold medal – first place | 2002 Changwon | |
| Gold medal – first place | 2006 Al-Rayyan | |

Huh Young-Sook (born July 2, 1975 in Jeongeup) is a South Korean handball player who competed in the 2000 and 2004 Summer Olympics.

In 2000, she was part of the South Korean team which finished fourth in the Olympic tournament. She played all seven matches and scored 23 goals.

Four years later she won the silver medal with the South Korean team. She played two matches and scored one goal. South Korea lost to Denmark in the final on a penalty shoot out.

Huh has played for KIF Kolding in Denmark between 2006 and 2012. She was brought in as the replacement for Lene Thomsen, who had signed for Viborg HK.
