= Liu Guini =

Chinese handball player (born 1982)

Liu Guini (born 1982) is a Chinese team handball player. Playing on the Chinese national team, she competed at the 2008 Summer Olympics in Beijing, where China placed sixth.
