= Moon Kyeong-ha =

South Korean handball player (born 1980)

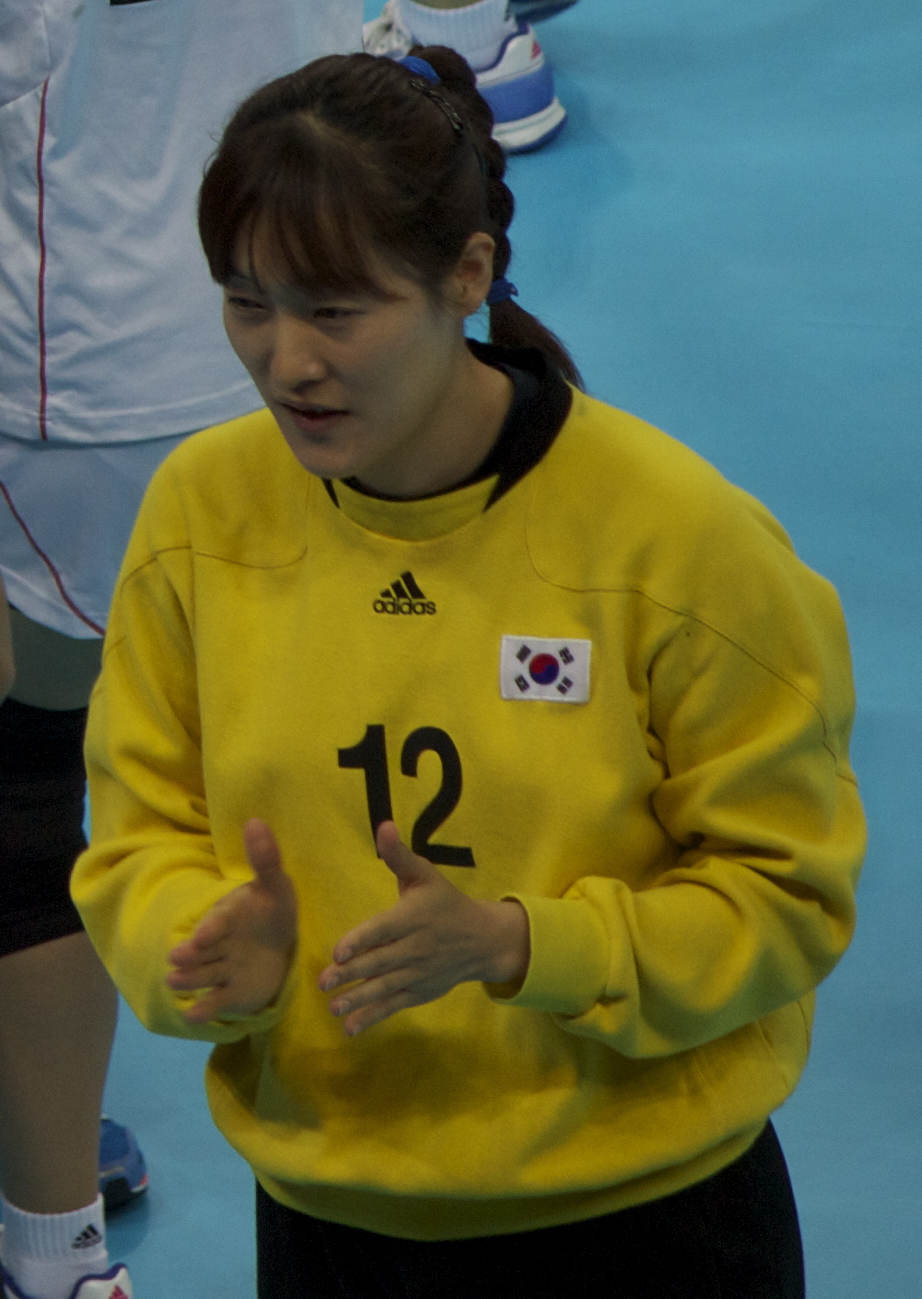

Korean name
- Hangul: 문경하
- Hanja: 文敬河
- RR: Mun Gyeongha
- MR: Mun Kyŏngha

Olympic medal record

Women's Handball
| Silver medal – second place | 2004 Athens | Team |

World Championship
| Bronze medal – third place | 2003 Croatia | |

Asian Games
| Gold medal – first place | 2002 Changwon | |
| Gold medal – first place | 2006 Doha | |
| Bronze medal – third place | 2010 Guangzhou | |

Moon Kyeong-Ha (born May 29, 1980) is a South Korean handball player who competed in the 2000 Summer Olympics, the 2004 Summer Olympics, and the 2012 Summer Olympics.

== National team ==
In 2000, she was part of the South Korean team which finished fourth in the Olympic tournament. She played one match as goalkeeper, as Oh Yong-ran was the 1st choice keeper.

At the 2003 World Women's Handball Championship, she won a bronze medal. In 2004 years later she won the silver medal at the 2004 Olympics with the South Korean team. She played four matches, including the final, as goalkeeper. Korea lost to Denmark in the final on a penalty shoot out. Moon was not in goal for the shoot-out, as South Korea chose Oh Yong-ran instead.

She also won gold medals at the 2002 and 2006 Asian Games, and a bronze medal at the 2010 Asian Games,

== Club career ==
In the 2008-09 season she played for Austrian Hypo Niederösterreich together with her national team mate Oh Seong-ok.

== Individual awards ==
- Carpathian Trophy Best Goalkeeper: 2006
