= Lee Gong-joo =

South Korean handball player (born 1980)

Personal information
- Nationality: South Korean
- Born: 25 March 1980 (age 46) Busan, South Korea
- Height: 1.63 m (5 ft 4 in)

Sport
- Sport: Handball
- Position: Left wing

Senior clubs
- Years: Team
- 1999 - 2003: Jeil Fire
- 2004 - 2006: Busan Sports Council
National team
- Years: Team
- –: South Korea
Medal record
Women's handball
Olympic Games
Silver medal – second place	2004 Athens	Team
World Championship
Bronze medal – third place	2003 Croatia	Team
Asian Games
Gold medal – first place	2006 Al-Rayyan
Asian Championship
Gold medal – first place	2006 China
- Lee Gong-joo
- Hangul: 이공주
- Hanja: 李公主
- RR: I Gongju
- MR: I Kongju

Lee Gong-Joo (born March 25, 1980 in Busan) is a South Korean handball player who competed in the 2004 Summer Olympics.

In 2004, she won the silver medal with the South Korean team. She played six matches, including the final, and scored nine goals.

She also won a bronze medal at the 2003 World Women's Handball Championship, a gold medal at the 2006 Asian Games, and a gold medal at the 2006 Asian Championship in China.

== Club handball ==
Lee played for 'Jeil Fire' and 'Busan Sports Council HC' in her home town.
