= Wei Qiuxiang =

Chinese handball player (born 1986)

Personal information
- Nationality: Chinese
- Born: 15 February 1986 (age 40) Liujiang District
- Height: 177 cm (70 in)

Sport
- Sport: Handball
- Position: Right wing
National team
- Years: Team
- –: China

Wei Qiuxiang (born 15 February 1986) is a Chinese handball player. She has played on the Chinese national team, competed at the 2008 Summer Olympics in Beijing, where China placed sixth, and participated at the 2009 World Women's Handball Championship at home, as well as the 2011 World Women's Handball Championship in Brazil.
