= Natalya Yakovleva (handballer) =

Kazakhstani handball player

Personal information
- Nationality: Kazakhstani
- Born: 29 September 1986 (age 40) Shymkent, Kazakh SSR, Soviet Union
- Height: 180 cm (71 in)

Sport
- Sport: Handball

Senior clubs
- Years: Team
- –: Kazygurt
- –: Almaty
National team
- Years: Team
- –: Kazakhstan
Medal record
Asian Games
Silver medal – second place	2006 Al-Riyyan

Natalya Yakovleva (born 29 September 1986) is a handball player from Kazakhstan. She plays on the Kazakhstan women's national handball team, and played at the 2007 World Women's Handball Championship, which was Kazakhstan's first ever participation at a world championship. They finished 18th of 24. She also participated at the 2011 World Women's Handball Championship in Brazil.
