= An Jung-hwa =

South Korean handball player (born 1981)

Personal information
- Nationality: South Korean
- Born: 20 February 1981 (age 45) South Korea
- Height: 1.62 m (5 ft 4 in)

Sport
- Sport: Handball
- Position: Left wing
National team
- Years: Team
- –: South Korea
Medal record
Representing South Korea
Olympic Games
Bronze medal – third place	2008 Beijing	Team
Asian Games
Gold medal – first place	2006 Doha	Team

Korean name
- Hangul: 안정화
- RR: An Jeonghwa
- MR: An Chŏnghwa

An Jung-hwa (Korean: 안정화; born 20 February 1981), also known as An Jeong-Hwa, is a South Korean professional handball player and Olympic medalist, who played on the South Korean national team.

== Professional career ==
In 2006, An participated in the 15th Asian Games in Doha, Qatar, as part of the South Korean national team and won the gold medal.

In 2008, she played for Daegu Metropolitan City Hall, a South Korean handball club located in Daegu.

The same year, An also competed at the 2008 Summer Olympics in Beijing with the South Korean team. She played as left wing, scored multiple times during the tournament and won the bronze medal.
