= Wu Wenjuan =

Chinese handball player (born 1981)

Wu Wenjuan (born 1981) is a Chinese team handball player. Playing on the Chinese national team, she competed at the 2008 Summer Olympics in Beijing, where China placed sixth.
