= Natalya Kubrina =

Kazakhstani handball player (born 1975)

Personal information
- Nationality: Kazakhstani
- Born: 15 January 1975 (age 51) Alma-Ata, Kazakh SSR, Soviet Union
- Height: 172 cm (68 in)

Sport
- Sport: Handball

Senior clubs
- Years: Team
- –: Otan Daulet
- –: HC Almaty
National team
- Years: Team
- –: Kazakhstan
Medal record
Asian Games
Silver medal – second place	2002 Changwon
Silver medal – second place	2006 Al-Riyyan

Nataliya Kubrina (born 15 January 1975) is a Kazakhstani handball player. She was born in Almaty. She competed at the 2008 Summer Olympics in Beijing, where the Kazakhstani team placed 10th.

She also played at the 2007 World Women's Handball Championship, which was Kazakhstan's first ever participation at a world championship. They finished 18th of 24.
