= Myoung Bok-hee =

South Korean handball player (born 1979)

- Hangul: 명복희
- Hanja: 明福姬
- RR: Myeong Bokhui
- MR: Myŏng Pokhŭi

Olympic medal record

Women's Handball
Silver medal – second place	2004 Athens	Team

Asian Games
Gold medal – first place	2002 Changwon	
Gold medal – first place	2006 Al-Riyyan	
Bronze medal – third place	2010 Guangdong	

Myoung Bok-Hee (Korean: 명복희; born January 29, 1979), also spelled as Myeong Bok-hui, is a South Korean handball player who competed in the 2004 Summer Olympics.

In 2004, she won the silver medal with the South Korean national team. She played three matches including the final and scored three goals. South Korea lost to Denmark in the final on a penalty shoot out.

She also won gold medals with South Korea at the 2002 and 2006 Asian Games, as well as a bronze medal at the 2010 Asian Games.
