= Choi Im-jeong =

South Korean handball player (born 1981)

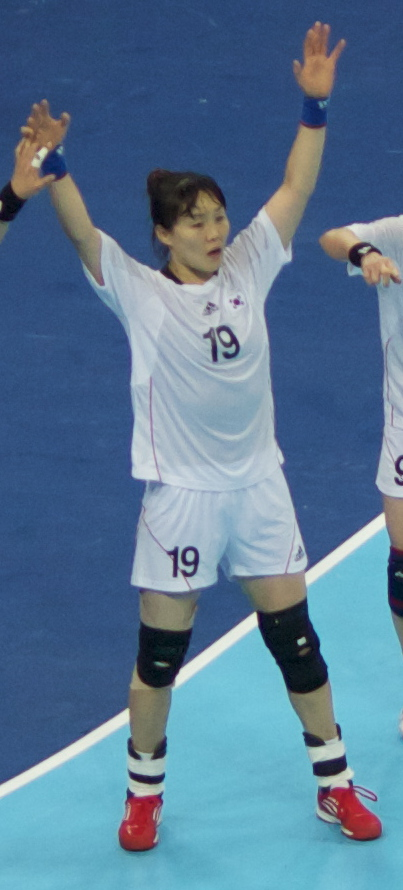
- Choi at 2012 Olympics

Personal information
- Born: February 14, 1981 (age 45) Busan, South Korea
- Height: 182 cm (72 in)

Sport
- Sport: Handball
- Position: Right back

Senior clubs
- Years: Team
- –2007: Daegu City Hall
- 2007–2010: SK Aarhus
- 2010–2014: Daegu City Hall
- 2014–2017: Seoul City Hall
National team
- Years: Team
- –: South Korea
Medal record
Women's Handball
Representing South Korea
Olympic Games
Silver medal – second place	2004 Athens	Team
Bronze medal – third place	2008 Beijing	Team
Asian Games
Gold medal – first place	2006 Al-Riyyan
- Korean name
- Hangul: 최임정
- Hanja: 崔任貞
- RR: Choe Imjeong
- MR: Ch'oe Imjŏng

Choi Im-jeong (Korean: 최임정; born February 14, 1981, in Busan) is a South Korean former handball player who competed in the 2004 Summer Olympics, 2008 Summer Olympics and the 2012 Summer Olympics.

In 2004, she won the silver medal with the South Korean team. She played all seven matches and scored 16 goals. South Korea lost to Denmark in the final on a penalty shoot out.

In 2008, she was part of the South Korean team that won the bronze medal.

She played for Deagu City Hall and Seoul City Hall in Korea, and for SK Aarhus in Denmark. She moved to Denmark in 2006 together with Huh Soon-young. She retired in 2017.
