= Woo Sun-hee =

South Korean handball player (born 1978)

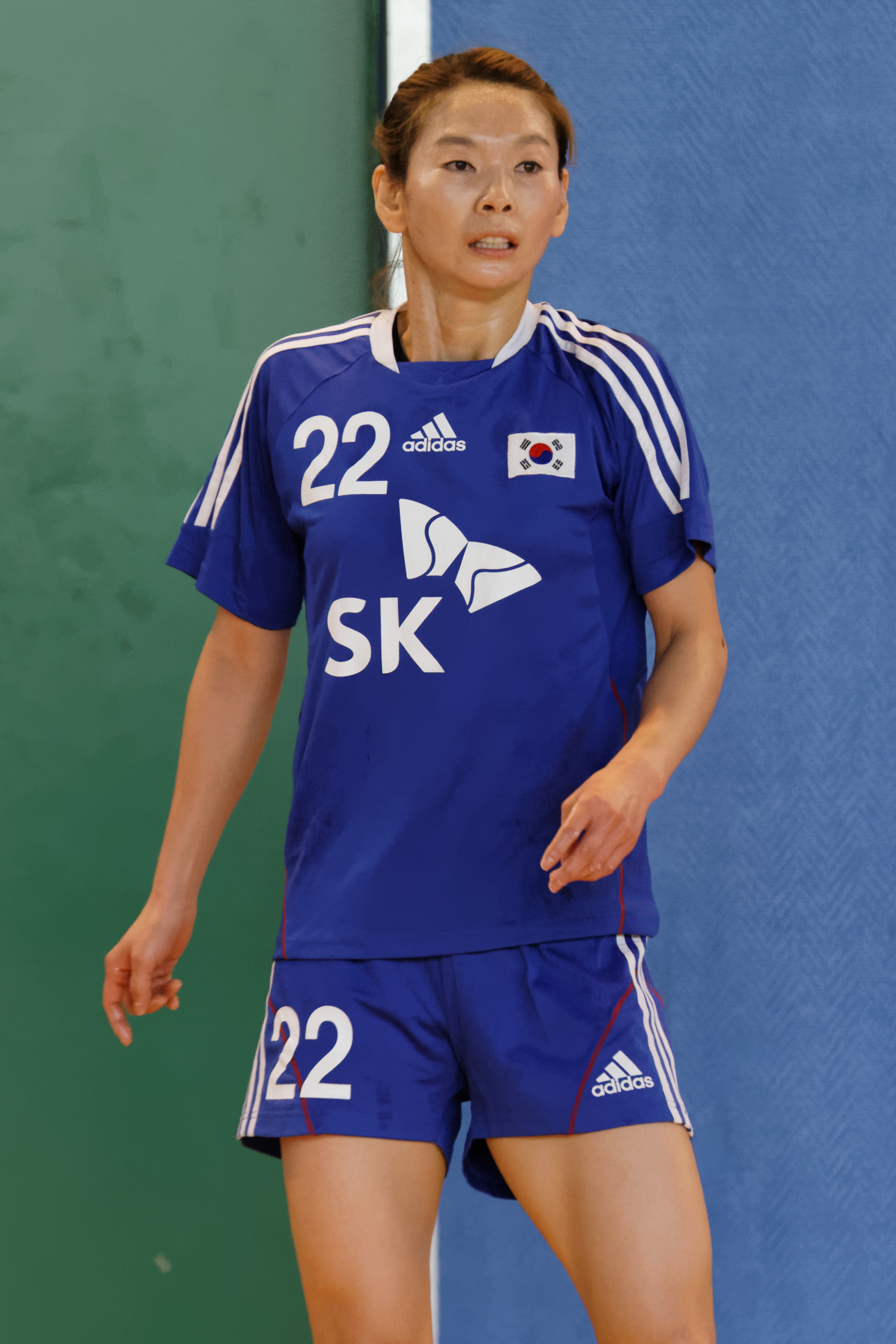

Personal information
- Nationality: South Korean
- Born: 1 July 1978 (age 48) Gyeonggi Province, South Korea
- Height: 1.71 m (5 ft 7 in)

Sport
- Sport: Handball
- Position: Right wing

Senior clubs
- Years: Team
- 2001–2003: Gwangju City
- 2003–2007: Samcheok City
- 2007–2009: Rulmentul Braşov
- 2009–2017: Wonderful Samcheok
National team
Years	Team	Apps	(Gls)
2001–2016	South Korea	119	(380)

Teams managed
- 2009–2017: Wonderful Samcheok
- 2024–: South Korea junior
Medal record
Olympic Games
Silver medal – second place	2004 Athens	Team
Bronze medal – third place	2008 Beijing	Team
World Championship
Bronze medal – third place	2003 Croatia	Team
Asian Games
Gold medal – first place	2002 Busan	Team
Gold medal – first place	2006 Doha	Team
Gold medal – first place	2014 Incheon	Team
Bronze medal – third place	2010 Guangzhou	Team
- Woo Sun-hee
- Hangul: 우선희
- Hanja: 禹仙姬
- RR: U Seonhui
- MR: U Sŏnhŭi

Woo Sun-Hee (Korean: 우선희; Hanja: 禹仙姬; born 1 July 1978) is a former South Korean handball player and current coach.

== National team ==
She made her debut on the South Korean national team in 2001.

In 2003, Woo competed in the 2003 World Women's Handball Championship held in Croatia and led her team to the bronze medal. She was finally named to the All-Star team of the competition.

At the 2004 Summer Olympics, she won the silver medal with the South Korean team. She played all seven matches and scored 37 goals. Korea lost to Denmark in the final on a penalty shoot out.

She missed the 2008 Olympics due to injury. Four years later she was part of the Korea team that finished 4th, losing to Spain in the third place play-off.

She also won gold medals at the 2002, 2006 and 2014 Asian Games, and represented Korea at the 2016 Summer Olympics and at the 2010 Asian Games. She retired from the South Korean national team in November 2017 after 15 years on the team.

== Handball Career ==
Kim started playing handball aged 11.

From 2007 to 2009 she played for Romanian Rulmentul Brașov. After some years in Europe in the Romanian League, Woo Sun-Hee has returned to Korea where she played handball, until 2017. From 2009 onwards she was the player coach at her team.

In 2024 she became the coach of the South Korean youth national team.
