= Yana Vassilyeva =

Kazakhstani handball player (born 1981)

Personal information
- Nationality: Kazakhstani
- Born: 28 November 1981 (age 44) Oskemen, Kazakh SSR, Soviet Union
- Height: 184 cm (72 in)

Sport
- Sport: Handball
National team
- Years: Team
- –: Kazakhstan
Medal record
Asian Games
Silver medal – second place	2006 Al-Riyyan

Yana Vasilyeva (born 28 November 1981) is a Kazakhstani handball player. She was born in Oskemen. She competed at the 2008 Summer Olympics in Beijing, where the Kazakhstani team placed 10th.

She also played at the 2007 World Women's Handball Championship, which was Kazakhstan's first ever participation at a world championship. They finished 18th of 24.

== Biography ==
A product of Ust-Kamenogorsk handball. Two-time world champion among youth teams as part of the Russian national team (2001, 2003). In 2004, she became the European champion in beach handball. In 2005, she participated in the World Games for non-Olympic sports. In 2006 she won a silver medal at the 2006 Asian Games.
