= Kimiko Hida =

Japanese handball player (born 1977)

Personal information
- Nationality: Japanese
- Born: 26 September 1977 (age 49)
- Height: 1.70 m (5 ft 7 in)

Sport
- Sport: Handball
- Position: Goalkeeper
- Current club: Sony Semiconductor
National team
Years	Team	Apps	(Gls)
–	Japan	118	(0)

Kimiko Hida (飛田 季実子, Hida Kimiko; born 26 September 1977) is a Japanese handball goalkeeper for Sony Semiconductor and the Japanese national team.

She represented Japan at the 2013 World Women's Handball Championship in Serbia.
