= Kim Cha-youn =

South Korean handball player (born 1981)

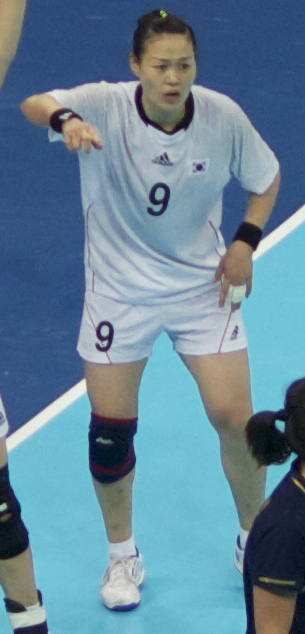

Personal information
- Nationality: South Korean
- Born: 10 January 1981 (age 45)
- Height: 176 cm (69 in)

Sport
- Sport: Handball
- Position: Left wing
- Current club: Retired

Senior clubs
- Years: Team
- –: Daegu Metropolitan City
- 2006–2009: Hypo Niederösterreich
- –: Omron Handball
National team
- Years: Team
- –: South Korea
Medal record
Representing South Korea
Women's Handball
Silver medal – second place	2004 Athens	Team
Bronze medal – third place	2008 Beijing	Team
Asian Games
Gold medal – first place	2002 Changwon
Gold medal – first place	2006 Al-Rayyan
Bronze medal – third place	2010 Guangdong
- Kim Cha-youn
- Hangul: 김차연
- Hanja: 金且姸
- RR: Gim Chayeon
- MR: Kim Ch'ayŏn

Kim Cha-Youn (Korean: 김차연; born February 10, 1981) is a South Korean handball player who won and silver medal at the 2004 Summer Olympics and a bronze medal at the 2008 Summer Olympics.

In 2004, she won the silver medal with the South Korean team. She played all seven matches and scored 19 goals. Korea lost to Denmark in the final on a penalty shoot out.

Between 2006 and 2008 she played for Hypo Niederösterreich in Austria together with her national team colleagues Oh Seong-ok and Han Sun-hee. Here she won the Austrian Championship and Cup in all three seasons, and reached the final of the 2007-08 EHF Women's Champions League, where they lost to Russian Zvezda Zvenigorod. Afterwards she played for the Japanese team Omron Handball.

At the 2012 Olympics she finished fourth with the Korean team, losing to Spain in the third place play-off.
