= Liu Yun (handballer) =

Chinese handball player (born 1982)

Liu Yun (simplified Chinese: 刘赟; traditional Chinese: 劉贇; pinyin: Liú Yūn; born March 6, 1982, in Hefei, Anhui) is a Chinese handball player who competed at the 2004 Summer Olympics.

In 2004, she finished eighth with the Chinese team in the women's competition. She played all seven matches and scored seven goals.
