= Park Chung-hee (handballer) =

South Korean handball player (born 1975)

- Hangul: 박정희
- Hanja: 朴貞嬉
- RR: Bak Jeonghui
- MR: Pak Chŏnghŭi

Olympic medal record

Representing South Korea

Women's Handball
Bronze medal – third place	2008 Beijing	Team

World Championship
Bronze medal – third place	2003 Croatia	Team

Asian Games
Gold medal – first place	2006 Al-Rayyan	

Park Chung-hee (born April 10, 1975), also spelled as Park Jeong-hui, is a South Korean handball player who competed at the 2008 Summer Olympics.

In 2008, she won a bronze medal with the South Korean team.

She also won a gold medal at the 2006 Asian Games with South Korea, and a bronze medal at the 2003 World Women's Handball Championship. She also represented South Korea at the 2007 World Women's Handball Championship.

She played in Europe for Austrian Hypo Niederösterreich and for Montenegrin ŽRK Budućnost Podgorica.
