= Liu Xiaomei (handballer) =

Chinese handball player (born 1985)

Personal information
- Nationality: Chinese
- Born: 2 May 1985 (age 41) Chuzhou, China
- Height: 1.78 m (5 ft 10 in)

Sport
- Sport: Handball
- Position: Right back
- Current club: Anhui
National team
Years	Team	Apps	(Gls)
–	China	150	(210)
Medal record
Asian Games
Gold medal – first place	2010 Guangzhou	Team
Silver medal – second place	2018 Jakarta	Team
Bronze medal – third place	2002 Busan	Team

Liu Xiaomei (simplified Chinese: 刘晓妹; traditional Chinese: 劉曉妹; pinyin: Liú Xiǎomèi; born 2 May 1985) is a Chinese handball player for Anhui and the Chinese national team.

In 2004, she finished eighth with the Chinese team in the women's competition. She played all seven matches and scored 14 goals.

She also played at the 2009 World Women's Handball Championship at home.
