= Yelena Portova =

Kazakhstani handball player (born 1985)

Personal information
- Nationality: Kazakhstani
- Born: 5 September 1985 (age 41) Shymkent, Kazakh SSR, Soviet Union
- Height: 185 cm (73 in)

Sport
- Sport: Handball

Senior clubs
- Years: Team
- –: Kazygurt
National team
- Years: Team
- –: Kazakhstan
Medal record
Asian Games
| Silver medal – second place | 2006 Al-Riyyan |

Yelena Portova (born 5 September 1985) is a Kazakhstani handball player. She was born in Shymkent. She competed at the 2008 Summer Olympics in Beijing, where the Kazakhstani team placed 10th.

She also played at the 2007 World Women's Handball Championship, which was Kazakhstan's first ever participation. They finished 18th of 24.
