= Wu Yanan (handballer) =

Chinese handball player (born 1981)

Wu Yanan (simplified Chinese: 吴亚楠; traditional Chinese: 吳亞楠; pinyin: Wú Yànán; born September 14, 1981, in Zhangjiakou, Hebei) is a female Chinese handball player who competed at the 2004 Summer Olympics.

In 2004, she finished eighth with the Chinese team in the women's competition. She played all seven matches and scored 16 goals.
