= Yuko Arihama =

Japanese handball player (born 1984)

Personal information
- Nationality: Japanese
- Born: 18 August 1984 (age 42)
- Height: 1.78 m (5 ft 10 in)

Sport
- Sport: Handball
- Position: Left back
- Current club: Omron
National team
Years	Team	Apps	(Gls)
–	Japan	133	(345)

Yuko Arihama (born 18 August 1984) is a Japanese handball player. She plays on the Japanese national team and participated at the 2011 World Women's Handball Championship in Brazil.
