= Akie Uegaki =

Japanese handball player (born 1984)

Akie Uegaki (植垣暁恵, Uegaki Akie; born 25 July 1984) is a Japanese handball player who has played for the Japan women's national handball team and plays for Japanese club Hiroshima Maple Reds. She was listed among the top ten goalscorers at the 2009 World Women's Handball Championship in China, with 48 goals.
