= Li Weiwei (handballer) =

Chinese handball player (born 1982)

Li Weiwei (Chinese: 李薇薇; pinyin: Lǐ Wéiwéi; born July 7, 1982, in Kunming, Yunnan) is a female Chinese handball player. She competed at the 2004 Summer Olympics and 2008 Summer Olympics.

In 2004, Li Weiwei finished eighth with the Chinese team in the women's competition. She played in all seven matches and scored 32 goals.

She also played at the 2009 World Women's Handball Championship at home.
