= Kaori Onozawa =

Japanese handball player (born 1979)

Kaori Onozawa (小野澤 香理, Onozawa Kaori; born 1979) is a Japanese team handball player. She plays on the Japanese national team, and participated at the 2011 World Women's Handball Championship in Brazil.
