= Lee Min-hee =

South Korean handball player (born 1980)

Personal information
- Nationality: South Korean
- Born: 4 February 1980 (age 46) Seoul, South Korea
- Height: 1.74 m (5 ft 9 in)

Sport
- Sport: Handball
- Position: Goalkeeper

Senior clubs
- Years: Team
- 1997-2004: Jeil Fire
- 2004-2007: Busan Facilities Corporation
- 2007: Hiroshima Maple Reds
- 2007-2011: Yongin City Hall
National team
- Years: Team
- –: South Korea
Medal record
Bronze medal – third place	2008 Beijing	Team
Asian Games
Gold medal – first place	2006 Doha	Team
Bronze medal – third place	2010 Guangzhou	Team
Asian Championship
Gold medal – first place	1999 Japan	Team
Gold medal – first place	2006 China	Team
Gold medal – first place	2008 Thailand	Team
Silver medal – second place	2010 Kazakhstan	Team
- Lee Min-hee
- Hangul: 이민희
- Hanja: 李珉姬
- RR: I Minhui
- MR: I Minhŭi

Lee Min-Hee (Korean: 이민희; born 4 February 1980), also spelled as Lee Min-Hui, is a South Korean handball player who competed at the 2008 Summer Olympics. In 2008, she won a bronze medal with the South Korean team.

She also won a gold medal at the 2006 Asian Games, and a bronze medal at the 2010 Asian Games, as well as gold medals at three Asian Women's Handball Championships.

She married handballer Park Chan-young in 2010.
