= Wang Shasha (handballer) =

Chinese handball player (born 1987)

Personal information
- Nationality: Chinese
- Born: 8 January 1987 (age 39) Shandong, China
- Height: 1.76 m (5 ft 9 in)

Sport
- Sport: Handball
- Position: Left back
- Current club: Shandong Club
National team
Years	Team	Apps	(Gls)
–	China	195	(420)

Wang Shasha (Chinese: 王莎莎; pinyin: Wáng Shāshā; born January 8, 1987) is a female Chinese handball player who competed at the 2004 Summer Olympics.

In 2004, she finished eighth with the Chinese team in the women's competition. She played all seven matches and scored 25 goals.

She also played at the 2009 World Women's Handball Championship at home, and the 2013 World Women's Handball Championship in Serbia.
