= Marina Pikalova =

Kazakhstani handball player (born 1985)

Personal information
- Nationality: Kazakhstani
- Born: 31 May 1982 (age 44) Shymkent, Kazakh SSR, Soviet Union
- Height: 1.63 m (5 ft 4 in)

Sport
- Sport: Handball
- Position: Right wing
- Current club: USC Dostyk
National team
Years	Team	Apps	(Gls)
–	Kazakhstan	119	(592)
Medal record
Asian Games
Silver medal – second place	2006 Al-Riyyan
Bronze medal – third place	2014 Incheon

Marina Pikalova (born 16 March 1985) is a Kazakhstani handball player for USC Dostyk and the Kazakhstani national team.

She competed at the 2008 Summer Olympics in Beijing, where the Kazakhstani team placed 10th.

She played at the 2007 World Women's Handball Championship, which was Kazakhstan's first ever participation. They finished 18th of 24. She also competed at the 2015 World Women's Handball Championship in Denmark.
