= Moon Pil-hee =

South Korean handball player (born 1982)

- Korean name
- Hangul: 문필희
- Hanja: 文弼姬
- RR: Mun Pilhui
- MR: Mun P'irhŭi

Olympic medal record

Representing South Korea

Women's handball
Silver medal – second place	2004 Athens	Team
Bronze medal – third place	2008 Beijing	Team

Asian Games
Gold medal – first place	2006 Al-Rayyan	Team
Bronze medal – third place	2010 Guangdong	Team

Moon Pil-Hee (Korean: 문필희; born December 2, 1982), also spelled as Mun Pil-hui, is a South Korean handball player who competed in the 2004 Summer Olympics and the 2008 Summer Olympics.

In 2004, Moon won the silver medal with the South Korea national team. She played all seven matches and scored 16 goals. Korea lost to Denmark in the final on a penalty shoot out.

In 2008 she won bronze medals with the South Korean team.

She also won a gold medal at the 2006 Asian Games. In the final against Kazakhstan, she was the top scorer with nine goals. At the 2010 Asian Games she won a bronze medal.

She retired in 2019, and became a coach afterwards.
