= Yoon Hyun-kyung =

Korean team handball player (born 1986)

- Hangul: 윤현경
- Hanja: 尹現敬
- RR: Yun Hyeongyeong
- MR: Yun Hyŏn'gyŏng

Yoon Hyun-kyung (Korean: 윤현경; born June 22, 1986) is a Korean team handball player. She plays on the South Korean national team, and participated at the 2011 World Women's Handball Championship in Brazil.
