= Aiko Hayafune =

Japanese handball player (born 1980)

Personal information
- Nationality: Japanese
- Born: 23 January 1980 (age 46)
- Height: 1.67 m (5 ft 6 in)

Sport
- Sport: Handball
- Position: Right back
- Current club: MIE violet' IRIS
National team
Years	Team	Apps	(Gls)
–	Japan	95	(276)

Aiko Hayafune (早船 愛子, Hayafune Aiko; born 1980) is a Japanese team handball player. She plays on the Japanese national team, and participated at the 2011 World Women's Handball Championship in Brazil.
