= Kazakhstan at the 2008 Summer Olympics =

- IOC code: KAZ
- NOC: National Olympic Committee of the Republic of Kazakhstan
- Website: www.olympic.kz (in Kazakh, Russian, and English)

in Beijing
- Competitors: 130 in 19 sports
- Flag bearers: Bakhyt Akhmetov (opening); Yerkebulan Shynaliyev (closing)
- Medals Ranked 37th: Gold 2 Silver 3 Bronze 4 Total 9

Summer Olympics appearances (overview)
- 1996; 2000; 2004; 2008; 2012; 2016; 2020; 2024; 2028

Other related appearances
- Russian Empire (1900–1912); Soviet Union (1952–1988); Unified Team (1992)

Kazakhstan was represented at the 2008 Summer Olympics in Beijing, China by the National Olympic Committee of the Republic of Kazakhstan.

In total, 130 athletes including 60 men and 70 women represented Kazakhstan in 19 different sports including archery, athletics, boxing, canoeing, cycling, gymnastics, handball, judo, modern pentathlon, rowing, shooting, swimming, synchronised swimming, table tennis, taekwondo, triathlon, volleyball, weightlifting and wrestling.

Kazakhstan won a total 14 medals at the games including three gold, five silver and six bronze. However, five of these medals were later stripped due to doping offences.

== Competitors ==
In total, 130 athletes represented Kazakhstan at the 2008 Summer Olympics in Beijing, China across 18 different sports.

Sport	Men	Women	Total
Archery	0	1	1
Athletics	7	12	19
Boxing	10	0	10
Canoeing	6	1	7
Cycling	2	1	3
Gymnastics	0	1	1
Handball	0	14	14
Judo	4	6	10
Modern pentathlon	0	2	2
Rowing	0	3	3
Shooting	4	3	7
Swimming	9	3	12
Synchronised swimming	–	2	2
Table tennis	0	1	1
Taekwondo	1	1	2
Triathlon	1	0	1
Volleyball	0	12	12
Weightlifting	5	3	8
Wrestling	12	4	16
Total	60	70	130

== Medalists ==
During the games Kazakhstan won a total of 14 medals at the games including three gold, five silver and six bronze. However, five of these medals were later stripped due to doping offences. These included the gold won by Ilya Ilyin, the silvers won by Irina Nekrassova and Taimuraz Tigiyev and the bronzes wn by Asset Mambetov and Mariya Grabovetskaya.

A pink background donates a medal which was later stripped from the competitor.

Medal	Name	Sport	Event	Date
Gold	Alla Vazhenina	Weightlifting	Women's 75 kg	15 August
Gold	Ilya Ilyin	Weightlifting	Men's 94 kg	17 August
Gold	Bakhyt Sarsekbayev	Boxing	Welterweight	24 August
Silver	Irina Nekrassova	Weightlifting	Women's 63 kg	12 August
Silver	Nurbakyt Tengizbayev	Wrestling	Men's Greco-Roman 60 kg	12 August
Silver	Askhat Zhitkeyev	Judo	Men's 100 kg	14 August
Silver	Olga Rypakova	Athletics	Women's triple jump	17 August
Silver	Taimuraz Tigiyev	Wrestling	Men's freestyle 96 kg	21 August
Bronze	Asset Mambetov	Wrestling	Men's Greco-Roman 96 kg	14 August
Bronze	Mariya Grabovetskaya	Weightlifting	Women's +75 kg	16 August
Bronze	Yelena Shalygina	Wrestling	Women's freestyle 63 kg	17 August
Bronze	Marid Mutalimov	Wrestling	Men's freestyle 120 kg	21 August
Bronze	Arman Chilmanov	Taekwondo	Men's +80 kg	23 August
Bronze	Yerkebulan Shynaliyev	Boxing	Light heavyweight	24 August

== Archery ==
In total, one Kazakh athlete participated in the archery events – Anastassiya Bannova in the women's individual.

Athlete	Event	Ranking round		Round of 64	Round of 32	Round of 16	Quarterfinals	Semifinals	Final / BM	
Athlete	Event	Score	Seed	Opposition Score	Opposition Score	Opposition Score	Opposition Score	Opposition Score	Opposition Score	Rank
Anastassiya Bannova	Women's individual	628	35	Valeeva (ITA) (30); L 105–107	Did not advance					

== Athletics ==
In total, 19 Kazakh athletes participated in the athletics events – Marina Aitova and Yekaterina Yevseyeva in the women's high jump, Tatyana Azarova in the women's 400 m hurdles, Dmitry Karpov in the decathlon, Nataliya Ivoninskaya and Anastassiya Pilipenko in the women's 100 m hurdles, Rustam Kuvatov in the men's 20 km walk, Irina Litvinenko and Yelena Parfyonova in the women's riple jump, Takhir Mamashayev in the men's marathon, Yevgeniy Meleshenko in the men's 400 m hurdles, Vyacheslav Muravyev in the men's 200 m, Irina Naumenko in the heptathlon, Olga Rypakova in the women's long jump and the women's triple jump, Olga Tereshkova in the women's 400 m, Svetlana Tolstaya in the women's 20 km walk, Iolanta Ulyeva in the women's shot put, Roman Valiyev in the men's triple jump and Sergey Zasimovich in the men's high jump.

Men
Track & road events

Athlete	Event	Heat		Quarterfinal		Semifinal		Final	
Athlete	Event	Result	Rank	Result	Rank	Result	Rank	Result	Rank
Rustam Kuvatov	20 km walk	—N/a						1:28:25	42
Takhir Mamashayev	Marathon	—N/a						2:30:26	70
Yevgeniy Meleshenko	400 m hurdles	DNF		—N/a		Did not advance			
Vyacheslav Muravyev	200 m	21.68	7	Did not advance					

Field events

Athlete	Event	Qualification		Final	
Athlete	Event	Distance	Position	Distance	Position
Roman Valiyev	Triple jump	16.20	30	Did not advance	
Sergey Zasimovich	High jump	2.10	37	Did not advance	

Decathlon
Athlete	Event	100 m	LJ	SP	HJ	400 m	110H	DT	PV	JT	1500 m	Final	Rank
Dmitry Karpov	Result	11.83	DNS	—	—	—	—	—	—	—	—	DNF	
Dmitry Karpov	Points	685	0	—	—	—	—	—	—	—	—	DNF	

Women
Track & road events

Athlete	Event	Heat		Semifinal		Final	
Athlete	Event	Result	Rank	Result	Rank	Result	Rank
Tatyana Azarova	400 m hurdles	56.88	4	Did not advance			
Nataliya Ivoninskaya	100 m hurdles	13.20	6	Did not advance			
Anastassiya Pilipenko	100 m hurdles	12.99	3	Did not advance			
Olga Tereshkova	400 m	53.36	6	Did not advance			
Svetlana Tolstaya	20 km walk	—N/a				1:34:03	30

Field events

Athlete	Event	Qualification		Final	
Athlete	Event	Distance	Position	Distance	Position
Marina Aitova	High jump	1.93	=1 q	1.93	=10
Irina Litvinenko	Triple jump	12.92	32	Did not advance	
Yelena Parfyonova	Triple jump	13.46	27	Did not advance	
Olga Rypakova	Long jump	6.30	30	Did not advance	
Olga Rypakova	Triple jump	14.64	4 Q	15.11	2nd place, silver medalist(s)
Iolanta Ulyeva	Shot put	15.49	32	Did not advance	
Yekaterina Yevseyeva	High jump	1.85	28	Did not advance	

Heptathlon
Athlete	Event	100H	HJ	SP	200 m	LJ	JT	800 m	Final	Rank
Irina Naumenko	Result	DNF	—	—	—	—	—	—	DNF	
Irina Naumenko	Points	0	—	—	—	—	—	—	DNF	

== Boxing ==
In total, 10 Kazakh athletes participated in the boxing events – Kanat Abutalipov in the bantamweight category, Merey Akshalov in the lightweight category, Bakhtiyar Artayev in the middleweight category, Galib Jafarov in the featherweight category, Ruslan Myrsatayev in the super heavyweight category, Serik Sapiyev in the light welterweight category, Bakhyt Sarsekbayev in the welterweight category, Mirat Sarsembayev in the flyweight category, Yerkebuian Shynaliyev in the light heavyweight category and Birzhan Zhakypov in the light flyweight category.

Athlete	Event	Round of 32	Round of 16	Quarterfinals	Semifinals	Final	
Athlete	Event	Opposition Result	Opposition Result	Opposition Result	Opposition Result	Opposition Result	Rank
Birzhan Zhakypov	Light flyweight	Essomba (CMR); W 7–3	Danielyan (ARM); W 13–7	Zou (CHN); L 4–9	Did not advance		
Mirat Sarsembayev	Flyweight	Kaczor (POL); W 14–5	Balakshin (RUS); L 4–12	Did not advance			
Kanat Abutalipov	Bantamweight	Bye	León (CUB); L 3–10	Did not advance			
Galib Jafarov	Featherweight	Imranov (AZE); L 5–9	Did not advance				
Merey Akshalov	Lightweight	Varga (HUN); W 12–3	Hu Q (CHN); L 7–11	Did not advance			
Serik Sapiyev	Light welterweight	Bye	Sánchez (VEN); W 22–3	Boonjumnong (THA); L 5–7	Did not advance		
Bakhyt Sarsekbayev	Welterweight	Trupish (CAN); W 20–1	Gruşac (MDA); W RSC	Mahmudov (UZB); W 12–7	Kim J-J (KOR); W 10–6	Banteaux (CUB); W 18–9	1st place, gold medalist(s)
Bakhtiyar Artayev	Middleweight	Rachidi (MAR); W 8–2	Korobov (RUS); W 10–7	DeGale (GBR); L 3–8	Did not advance		
Yerkebuian Shynaliyev	Light heavyweight	Semiotas (LTU); W 11–3	Negrón (PUR); W 9–3	Kurbanov (TJK); W DSQ	Zhang Xp (CHN); L 4–4^{+}	Did not advance	3rd place, bronze medalist(s)
Ruslan Myrsatayev	Super heavyweight	—N/a	Beahan (AUS); W RSC	Zhang Zl (CHN); L 2–12	Did not advance		

== Canoeing ==
In total, seven Kazakh athletes participated in the canoeing events – Alexey Dergunov, Alexandr Dyadchuk, Dmitriy Kaltenberger, Yekaterina Lukicheva, Kaisar Nurmaganbetov, Dmitriy Torlopov and Mikhail Yemelyanov.

=== Slalom ===
Athlete	Event	Preliminary						Semifinal		Final			
Athlete	Event	Run 1	Rank	Run 2	Rank	Total	Rank	Time	Rank	Time	Rank	Total	Rank
Yekaterina Lukicheva	Women's K-1	113.26	15	108.03	14	221.29	11 Q	128.08	12	Did not advance			

=== Sprint ===
Athlete	Event	Heats		Semifinals		Final	
Athlete	Event	Time	Rank	Time	Rank	Time	Rank
Alexey Dergunov	Men's K-1 500 m	1:39.82	6 QS	1:47.573	7	Did not advance	
Dmitriy Torlopov	Men's K-1 1,000 m	3:39.671	6 QS	3:47.212	8	Did not advance	
Mikhail Yemelyanov	Men's C-1 500 m	1:54.832	5 QS	2:06.908	8	Did not advance	
Mikhail Yemelyanov	Men's C-1 1,000 m	4:19.259	7 QS	4:16.813	8	Did not advance	
Alexandr Dyadchuk; Kaisar Nurmaganbetov	Men's C-2 500 m	1:45.730	7 QS	1:44.992	7	Did not advance	
Dmitriy Kaltenberger; Dmitriy Torlopov	Men's K-2 500 m	1:33.363	7 QS	1:33.512	6	Did not advance	

== Cycling ==
In total, three Kazakh athletes participated in the cycling events – Maxim Iglinsky, Andrey Mizurov and Zulfiya Zabirova.

Athlete	Event	Time	Rank
Maxim Iglinsky	Men's road race	Did not finish	
Andrey Mizurov	Men's road race	6:26:27	44
Andrey Mizurov	Men's time trial	1:06:32	24
Zulfiya Zabirova	Women's road race	3:32:45	10
Zulfiya Zabirova	Women's time trial	36:29.47	9

== Gymnastics ==
In total, one Kazakh athlete participated in the gymnastics events – Aliya Yussupova in the women's rhythmic individual all-around.

Athlete	Event	Qualification						Final					
Athlete	Event	Rope	Hoop	Clubs	Ribbon	Total	Rank	Rope	Hoop	Clubs	Ribbon	Total	Rank
Aliya Yussupova	Individual	17.575	17.900	17.575	16.750	69.800	5 Q	17.625	17.825	17.650	16.700	69.800	5

== Handball ==
In total, 14 Kazakh athletes participated in the handball events – Olga Ajiderskaya, Irina Borechko, Yelena Ilyukhina, Gulzira Iskakova, Nataliya Kubrina, Yuliya Markovich, Xeniya Nikandrova, Tatiana Parfenova, Marina Pikalova, Yelena Portova, Olga Travnikova, Yekaterina Tyapkova, Yana Vassilyeva, Nataliya Yakovleva in the women's tournament.

Group play

Team	Pld	W	D	L	GF	GA	GD	Pts	Qualification
Norway	5	5	0	0	154	106	+48	10	Qualified for the quarterfinals
Romania	5	4	0	1	150	112	+38	8	Qualified for the quarterfinals
China	5	2	0	3	122	135	−13	4	Qualified for the quarterfinals
France	5	2	0	3	121	128	−7	4	Qualified for the quarterfinals
Kazakhstan	5	1	1	3	109	137	−28	3	
Angola	5	0	1	4	109	147	−38	1	

9 August 2008; 14:00	Romania	31 – 19	Kazakhstan	Olympic Sports Centre Gymnasium; Referees: Aires Menezes, Aparecido Pinto (BRA)
9 August 2008; 14:00	Ardean-Elisei 6	(13–10)	Ajiderskaya 10	Olympic Sports Centre Gymnasium; Referees: Aires Menezes, Aparecido Pinto (BRA)
9 August 2008; 14:00	4× (yellow card) 5× (suspension) 1× (red card)	Report	3× (yellow card) 7× (suspension)	Olympic Sports Centre Gymnasium; Referees: Aires Menezes, Aparecido Pinto (BRA)

11 August 2008; 09:00	Kazakhstan	18 – 21	France	Olympic Sports Centre Gymnasium; Referees: Breto, Huelin (ESP)
11 August 2008; 09:00	Ajiderskaya 7	(8–10)	Lacrabère 6	Olympic Sports Centre Gymnasium; Referees: Breto, Huelin (ESP)
11 August 2008; 09:00	3× (yellow card) 4× (suspension) 1× (red card)	Report	3× (yellow card) 3× (suspension)	Olympic Sports Centre Gymnasium; Referees: Breto, Huelin (ESP)

13 August 2008; 19:00	Norway	35 – 19	Kazakhstan	Olympic Sports Centre Gymnasium; Referees: Aires Menezes, Aparecido Pinto (BRA)
13 August 2008; 19:00	Lybekk, Nyberg 5	(14–10)	Vassilyeva 6	Olympic Sports Centre Gymnasium; Referees: Aires Menezes, Aparecido Pinto (BRA)
13 August 2008; 19:00	3× (yellow card) 3× (suspension)	Report	3× (yellow card) 5× (suspension)	Olympic Sports Centre Gymnasium; Referees: Aires Menezes, Aparecido Pinto (BRA)

15 August 2008; 09:00	Kazakhstan	29 – 26	China	Olympic Sports Centre Gymnasium; Referees: Lemme, Ullrich (GER)
15 August 2008; 09:00	Pikalova 8	(14–10)	Li Weiwei 11	Olympic Sports Centre Gymnasium; Referees: Lemme, Ullrich (GER)
15 August 2008; 09:00	3× (yellow card) 5× (suspension)	Report	3× (yellow card) 3× (suspension)	Olympic Sports Centre Gymnasium; Referees: Lemme, Ullrich (GER)

17 August 2008; 10:45	Angola	24 – 24	Kazakhstan	Olympic Sports Centre Gymnasium; Referees: Din, Dinu (ROU)
17 August 2008; 10:45	Bengue 6	(16–14)	three players 5	Olympic Sports Centre Gymnasium; Referees: Din, Dinu (ROU)
17 August 2008; 10:45	3× (yellow card) 5× (suspension)	Report	3× (yellow card) 5× (suspension)	Olympic Sports Centre Gymnasium; Referees: Din, Dinu (ROU)

== Judo ==
In total, 10 Kazakh athletes participated in the judo events – Sagat Abikeyeva in the women's −78 kg category, Rinat Ibragimov in the men's −73 kg category, Yeldos Ikhsangaliyev in the men's +100 kg category, Gulzhan Issanova in the women's +78 kg category, Sholpan Kaliyeva in the women's −52 kg category, Kelbet Nurgazina in the women's −48 kg category, Gulzat Uralbayeva in the women's −57 kg category, Salamat Utarbayev in the men's −60 kg category Zhanar Zhanzunova in the women's −70 kg category and Askhat Zhitkeyev in the men's −100 kg category.

Men

Athlete	Event	Preliminary	Round of 32	Round of 16	Quarterfinals	Semifinals	Repechage 1	Repechage 2	Repechage 3	Final / BM	
Athlete	Event	Opposition Result	Opposition Result	Opposition Result	Opposition Result	Opposition Result	Opposition Result	Opposition Result	Opposition Result	Opposition Result	Rank
Salamat Utarbayev	−60 kg	Bye	Liu Rw (CHN); L 0000–0001	Did not advance							
Rinat Ibragimov	−73 kg	—N/a	Wang K-C (KOR); L 0000–1011	Did not advance			Muminov (UZB); L 0001–1010	Did not advance			
Askhat Zhitkeyev	−100 kg	—N/a	Al-Enezi (KUW); W 1110–0000	Mekić (BIH); W 1001–0010	Hadfi (HUN); W 1111–0100	Grol (NED); W 1010–0100	Bye			Naidangiin (MGL); L 0010–0120	2nd place, silver medalist(s)
Yeldos Ikhsangaliyev	+100 kg	—N/a	Pepic (AUS); W 0020–0000	Riner (FRA); L 0000–1000	Did not advance						

Women

Athlete	Event	Round of 32	Round of 16	Quarterfinals	Semifinals	Repechage 1	Repechage 2	Repechage 3	Final / BM	
Athlete	Event	Opposition Result	Opposition Result	Opposition Result	Opposition Result	Opposition Result	Opposition Result	Opposition Result	Opposition Result	Rank
Kelbet Nurgazina	−48 kg	Jossinet (FRA); W 1000–0000	Ouelgo (BUR); W 1001–0000	Pak O-S (PRK); L 0001–0011	Did not advance	Bye	Hormigo (POR); L 0001–0002	Did not advance		
Sholpan Kaliyeva	−52 kg	Bye	Shih P-C (TPE); W 0021–0020	An K-A (PRK); L 0000–0200	Did not advance	Bye	Velázquez (VEN); W 0010–0000	Heylen (BEL); W 1000–0000	Haddad (ALG); L 0010–0121	5
Gulzat Uralbayeva	−57 kg	Gotay (USA); L 0010–1001	Did not advance							
Zhanar Zhanzunova	−70 kg	Alvear (COL); L 0010–1001	Did not advance							
Sagat Abikeyeva	−78 kg	Castillo (CUB); L 0000–1021	Did not advance			Divya (IND); W 1010–0000	Possamaï (FRA); L 0001–1010	Did not advance		
Gulzhan Issanova	+78 kg	Sadkowska (POL); W 0101–0010	Polavder (SLO); L 0001–1000	Did not advance		Bye	Tserenkhand (MGL); L 0000–1000	Did not advance		

== Modern pentathlon ==
In total, two Kazakh athletes participated in the modern pentathlon events – Galina Dolgushina and Lada Jienbalanova in the women's competition.

Athlete	Event	Shooting (10 m air pistol)			Fencing (épée one touch)			Swimming (200 m freestyle)			Riding (show jumping)			Running (3000 m)			Total points	Final rank
Athlete	Event	Points	Rank	MP Points	Results	Rank	MP points	Time	Rank	MP points	Penalties	Rank	MP points	Time	Rank	MP Points	Total points	Final rank
Galina Dolgushina	Women's	176	23	1048	23–12	=3	952	2:26.28	28	1168	56	13	1144	11:44.57	34	904	5216	26
Lada Jienbalanova	Women's	170	32	976	15–20	=24	760	2:19.13	17	1252	452	36	748	DNS	36	0	3736	36

== Rowing ==
In total, three Kazakh athletes participated in the rowing events – Inga Dudchenko in the women's single sculls and Alexandra Opachanova and Natalya Voronova in the women's lightweight double sculls.

Athlete	Event	Heats		Repechage		Quarterfinals		Semifinals		Final	
Athlete	Event	Time	Rank	Time	Rank	Time	Rank	Time	Rank	Time	Rank
Inga Dudchenko	Single sculls	8:28.24	4 QF	—N/a		8:15.88	5 SC/D	8:16.95	3 FC	8:16.09	18
Alexandra Opachanova; Natalya Voronova	Lightweight double sculls	7:29.07	6 R	7:54.12	5 FC	—N/a		Bye		7:32.36	16

Qualification Legend: FA=Final A (medal); FB=Final B (non-medal); FC=Final C (non-medal); FD=Final D (non-medal); FE=Final E (non-medal); FF=Final F (non-medal); SA/B=Semifinals A/B; SC/D=Semifinals C/D; SE/F=Semifinals E/F; QF=Quarterfinals; R=Repechage

== Shooting ==
In total, six Kazakh athletes participated in the shooting events – Zauresh Baibussinova, Olga Dovgun, Vitaliy Dovgun, Elena Struchaeva, Rashid Yunusmetov and Yuriy Yurkov.

Men

Athlete	Event	Qualification		Final	
Athlete	Event	Points	Rank	Points	Rank
Vitaliy Dovgun	10 m air rifle	587	38	Did not advance	
Vitaliy Dovgun	50 m rifle prone	592	20	Did not advance	
Vitaliy Dovgun	50 m rifle 3 positions	1158	32	Did not advance	
Rashid Yunusmetov	10 m air pistol	578	20	Did not advance	
Rashid Yunusmetov	50 m pistol	555	17	Did not advance	
Yuriy Yurkov	10 m air rifle	586	42	Did not advance	
Yuriy Yurkov	50 m rifle prone	588	42	Did not advance	
Yuriy Yurkov	50 m rifle 3 positions	1162	27	Did not advance	

Women

Athlete	Event	Qualification		Final	
Athlete	Event	Points	Rank	Points	Rank
Zauresh Baibussinova	10 m air pistol	382	13	Did not advance	
Zauresh Baibussinova	25 m pistol	571	31	Did not advance	
Olga Dovgun	10 m air rifle	397	6 Q	498.1	6
Olga Dovgun	50 m rifle 3 positions	588	3 Q	686.3	6
Elena Struchaeva	Trap	69	3 Q	86	6

== Swimming ==
In total, 12 Kazakh athletes participated in the swimming events – Artur Dilman, Dmitriy Gordiyenko, Rustam Khudiyev, Stanislav Kuzmin, Marina Mulyayeva, Stanislav Osinsky, Vladislav Polyakov, Oleg Rabota, Yekaterina Rudenko, Yevgeniy Ryzhkov, Yekaterina Sadovnik and Alexandr Sklyar.

Men

Athlete	Event	Heat		Semifinal		Final	
Athlete	Event	Time	Rank	Time	Rank	Time	Rank
Artur Dilman	200 m freestyle	1:52.90	52	Did not advance			
Dmitriy Gordiyenko	200 m individual medley	2:03.92	37	Did not advance			
Dmitriy Gordiyenko	400 m individual medley	4:25.20	26	—N/a		Did not advance	
Rustam Khudiyev	100 m butterfly	54.62	55	Did not advance			
Stanislav Kuzmin	50 m freestyle	22.91	48	Did not advance			
Stanislav Osinsky	100 m backstroke	57.42	42	Did not advance			
Vladislav Polyakov	100 m breaststroke	1:00.80	17	Did not advance			
Vladislav Polyakov	200 m breaststroke	2:10.83	11 Q	2:11.87	15	Did not advance	
Oleg Rabota	400 m freestyle	4:02.16	36	—N/a		Did not advance	
Oleg Rabota	200 m backstroke	2:01.95	33	Did not advance			
Yevgeniy Ryzhkov	100 m breaststroke	1:01.83	=35	Did not advance			
Yevgeniy Ryzhkov	200 m breaststroke	2:12.44	22	Did not advance			
Alexandr Sklyar	100 m freestyle	51.24	52	Did not advance			

Women

Athlete	Event	Heat		Semifinal		Final	
Athlete	Event	Time	Rank	Time	Rank	Time	Rank
Marina Mulyayeva	50 m freestyle	26.57	46	Did not advance			
Yekaterina Rudenko	100 m backstroke	1:04.85	45	Did not advance			
Yekaterina Sadovnik	100 m breaststroke	1:11.14	34	Did not advance			

== Synchronised swimming ==
In total, two Kazakh athletes participated in the synchronised swimming events – Ainur Kerey and Arna Toktagan in the duet.

Athlete	Event	Technical routine		Free routine (preliminary)			Free routine (final)		
Athlete	Event	Points	Rank	Points	Total (technical + free)	Rank	Points	Total (technical + free)	Rank
Ainur Kerey; Arna Toktagan	Duet	41.750	20	42.583	84.333	20	Did not advance		

== Table tennis ==
In total, one Kazakh athlete participated in the table tennis events – Marina Shumakova in the women's singles.

Athlete	Event	Preliminary round	Round 1	Round 2	Round 3	Round 4	Quarterfinals	Semifinals	Final / BM	
Athlete	Event	Opposition Result	Opposition Result	Opposition Result	Opposition Result	Opposition Result	Opposition Result	Opposition Result	Opposition Result	Rank
Marina Shumakova	Women's singles	Pesotska (UKR); L 0–4	Did not advance							

== Taekwondo ==
In total, two Kazakh athletes participated in the taekwondo events – Arman Chilmanov in the men's +80 kg category and Liya Nurkina in the women's −67 kg category.

Athlete	Event	Round of 16	Quarterfinals	Semifinals	Repechage	Bronze Medal	Final	
Athlete	Event	Opposition Result	Opposition Result	Opposition Result	Opposition Result	Opposition Result	Opposition Result	Rank
Arman Chilmanov	Men's +80 kg	Nikolaidis (GRE); L 3–4	Did not advance		Zrouri (MAR); W WO	Matos (CUB); W DSQ	Did not advance	3rd place, bronze medalist(s)
Liya Nurkina	Women's −67 kg	Épangue (FRA); L 0–3	Did not advance					

== Triathlon ==
In total, one Kazakh athletes participated in the triathlon events – Danylo Sapunov in the men's race.

Athlete	Event	Swim (1.5 km)	Trans 1	Bike (40 km)	Trans 2	Run (10 km)	Total Time	Rank
Danylo Sapunov	Men's	18:11	0:29	59:05	0:31	32:42	1:50:58.93	21

== Volleyball ==
In total, 12 Kazakh athletes participated in the volleyball events – Yelena Ezau, Olga Grushko, Korinna Ishimtseva, Kseniya Ilyuchshenko, Olga Karpova, Yuliya Kutsko, Inna Matveyeva, Olga Nasedkina, Yelena Pavlova, Tatyana Pyurova, Irina Zaitseva and Nataliya Zhukova in the indoor women's tournament.

The team lost all but one of its matches, and didn't qualify for the final rounds. The team's final ranking was tied for 9th place.

Group play

Pos	Team	Pld	W	L	Pts	SPW	SPL	SPR	SW	SL	SR	Qualification
1	Brazil	5	5	0	10	377	226	1.668	15	0	MAX	Quarterfinals
2	Italy	5	4	1	9	372	315	1.181	12	4	3.000	Quarterfinals
3	Russia	5	3	2	8	353	312	1.131	10	6	1.667	Quarterfinals
4	Serbia	5	2	3	7	343	349	0.983	6	10	0.600	Quarterfinals
5	Kazakhstan	5	1	4	6	323	404	0.800	4	13	0.308	
6	Algeria	5	0	5	5	230	392	0.587	1	15	0.067	

9 August 2008; 12:15	Serbia	3–1	Kazakhstan	Beijing Institute of Technology Gymnasium; Attendance: 1,800; Referees: Mitch Davidson (Canada), Victor Manuel Rodriguez (Puerto Rico)
9 August 2008; 12:15	(25–21, 25–17, 23–25, 25–21) result statistics			Beijing Institute of Technology Gymnasium; Attendance: 1,800; Referees: Mitch Davidson (Canada), Victor Manuel Rodriguez (Puerto Rico)

11 August 2008; 12:00	Kazakhstan	0–3	Italy	Beijing Institute of Technology Gymnasium; Attendance: 3,100; Referees: Patricia Salvatore (United States), Humberto Salas (Mexico)
11 August 2008; 12:00	(19–25, 15–25, 21–25) result statistics			Beijing Institute of Technology Gymnasium; Attendance: 3,100; Referees: Patricia Salvatore (United States), Humberto Salas (Mexico)

13 August 2008; 12:30	Russia	3–0	Kazakhstan	Capital Indoor Stadium; Attendance: 12,000; Referees: Liu Jiang (China), Patricia Salvatore (United States)
13 August 2008; 12:30	(25–19, 25–18, 25–11) result statistics			Capital Indoor Stadium; Attendance: 12,000; Referees: Liu Jiang (China), Patricia Salvatore (United States)

15 August 2008; 12:00	Brazil	3–0	Kazakhstan	Beijing Institute of Technology Gymnasium; Attendance: 3,500; Referees: Dejan Jovanovic (Serbia), Karin Zahorcova (Czech Republic)
15 August 2008; 12:00	(25–13, 25–6, 27–25) result statistics			Beijing Institute of Technology Gymnasium; Attendance: 3,500; Referees: Dejan Jovanovic (Serbia), Karin Zahorcova (Czech Republic)

17 August 2008; 10:00	Kazakhstan	3–1	Algeria	Beijing Institute of Technology Gymnasium; Attendance: 3,500; Referees: Patricia Salvatore (United States), Massimo Menghini (Italy)
17 August 2008; 10:00	(25–18, 25–20, 17–25, 25–16) result statistics			Beijing Institute of Technology Gymnasium; Attendance: 3,500; Referees: Patricia Salvatore (United States), Massimo Menghini (Italy)

== Weightlifting ==
In total, nine Kazakh athletes participated in the weightlifting events – Bakhyt Akhmetov and Sergey Istomin in the men's −105 kg category, Mariya Grabovetskaya in the women's +75 kg category, Ilya Ilin in the men's −94 kg category, Vladimir Kuznetsov in the men's −77 kg category, Maiya Maneza and Irina Nekrassova in the women's −63 kg category, Vladimir Sedov in the men's −85 kg category and Alla Vazhenina in the women's−75 kg category.

Men

Athlete	Event	Snatch		Clean & Jerk		Total	Rank
Athlete	Event	Result	Rank	Result	Rank	Total	Rank
Vladimir Kuznetsov	−77 kg	160	7	191	10	351	9
Vladimir Sedov	−85 kg	108	3	200	9	380	DSQ
Ilya Ilin	−94 kg	~~180~~	~~4~~	~~226~~	~~1~~	~~406~~	DSQ
Bakhyt Akhmetov	−105 kg	190	4	225	6	415	5
Sergey Istomin	−105 kg	181	9	225	5	406	8

Women

Athlete	Event	Snatch		Clean & Jerk		Total	Rank
Athlete	Event	Result	Rank	Result	Rank	Total	Rank
Maiya Maneza	−63 kg	Did not start					
Irina Nekrassova	−63 kg	110	2	130	2	240	DSQ
Alla Vazhenina	−75 kg	119	2	147	3	266	1st place, gold medalist(s)
Mariya Grabovetskaya	+75 kg	120	3	150	3	270	DSQ

== Wrestling ==
In total, 16 Kazakh athletes participated in the wrestling events – Tatyana Bakatyuk in the women's freestyle −48 kg category, Darkhan Bayakhmetov in the men's Greco-Roman −66 kg category, Asset Imanbayev in the men's Greco-Roman −55 kg category, Gennadiy Laliyev in the men's freestyle −84 kg category, Asset Mambetov in the men's Greco-Roman −96 kg category, Roman Melyoshin in the men's Greco-Roman −74 kg category, Zhassulan Mukhtarbekuly in the men's freestyle −55 kg category, Marid Mutalimov in the men's freestyle −120 kg category, Baurzhan Orazgaliyev in the men's freestyle −60 kg category, Andrey Samokhin in the men's Greco-Roman −84 kg category, Yelena Shalygina in the women's freestyle −63 kg category, Olga Smirnova in the women's freestyle −55 kg category, Leonid Spiridonov in the men's freestyle −66 kg category, Nurbakyt Tengizbayev in the men's Greco-Roman −60 kg category, Taimuraz Tigiyev in the men's freestyle −96 kg category and Olga Zhanibekova in the women's freestyle−72 kg category.

Men's freestyle

Athlete	Event	Qualification	Round of 16	Quarterfinal	Semifinal	Repechage 1	Repechage 2	Final / BM	
Athlete	Event	Opposition Result	Opposition Result	Opposition Result	Opposition Result	Opposition Result	Opposition Result	Opposition Result	Rank
Zhassulan Mukhtarbekuly	−55 kg	Mansurov (UZB); L 0–3 ^{PO}	Did not advance						16
Baurzhan Orazgaliyev	−60 kg	Bye	Dutt (IND); L 1–3 ^{PP}	Did not advance					12
Leonid Spiridonov	−66 kg	Wang Q (CHN); W 3–1 ^{PP}	Azizov (AZE); W 3–1 ^{PP}	Farniev (RUS); W 3–1 ^{PP}	Stadnik (UKR); L 0–3 ^{PO}	Bye		Kumar (IND); L 1–3 ^{PP}	5
Gennadiy Laliyev	−84 kg	Sokhiev (UZB); L 1–3 ^{PP}	Did not advance						13
Taimuraz Tigiyev	−96 kg	Bye	Vivénes (VEN); W 3–0 ^{PO}	Batista (CUB); W 3–0 ^{PO}	Gogshelidze (GEO); W 3–1 ^{PP}	Bye		Muradov (RUS); L 0–3 ^{PO}	DSQ
Marid Mutalimov	−120 kg	Bye	Kim J-G (KOR); W 3–1 ^{PP}	Polatçı (TUR); W 3–1 ^{PP}	Akhmedov (RUS); L 0–3 ^{PO}	Bye		Masoumi (IRI); W 3–1 ^{PP}	3rd place, bronze medalist(s)

Men's Greco-Roman

Athlete	Event	Qualification	Round of 16	Quarterfinal	Semifinal	Repechage 1	Repechage 2	Final / BM	
Athlete	Event	Opposition Result	Opposition Result	Opposition Result	Opposition Result	Opposition Result	Opposition Result	Opposition Result	Rank
Asset Imanbayev	−55 kg	Bye	Amoyan (ARM); L 1–3 ^{PP}	Did not advance					13
Nurbakyt Tengizbayev	−60 kg	Bye	Berge (NOR); W 3–0 ^{PO}	Jung J-H (KOR); W 3–1 ^{PP}	Rahimov (AZE); L 1–3 ^{PP}	Bye		Sheng J (CHN); W 3–1 ^{PP}	2nd place, silver medalist(s)
Darkhan Bayakhmetov	−66 kg	Bye	Thätner (GER); W 3–1 ^{PP}	Li Yy (CHN); W 3–1 ^{PP}	S Guénot (FRA); L 1–3 ^{PP}	Bye		Siamionau (BLR); L 1–3 ^{PP}	5
Roman Melyoshin	−74 kg	Bye	Shahsavan (AUS); W 3–1 ^{PP}	Mikhalovich (BLR); L 1–3 ^{PP}	Did not advance				8
Andrey Samokhin	−84 kg	Bye	Mishin (RUS); L 1–3 ^{PP}	Did not advance					16
Asset Mambetov	−96 kg	Khushtov (RUS); L 0–3 ^{PO}	Did not advance			Timoncini (ITA); W 3–1 ^{PP}	Ežerskis (LTU); W 3–1 ^{PP}	Švec (CZE); W 3–1 ^{PP}	DSQ

- Nurbakyt Tengizbayev originally finished third, but in November 2016, he was promoted to second place due to disqualification of Vitaliy Rahimov.

Women's freestyle

Athlete	Event	Qualification	Round of 16	Quarterfinal	Semifinal	Repechage 1	Repechage 2	Final / BM	
Athlete	Event	Opposition Result	Opposition Result	Opposition Result	Opposition Result	Opposition Result	Opposition Result	Opposition Result	Rank
Tatyana Bakatyuk	−48 kg	Bye	Engelhardt (GER); W 3–0 ^{PO}	Medrano (ESA); W 3–0 ^{PO}	Huynh (CAN); L 0–3 ^{PO}	Bye		Stadnik (AZE); L 1–3 ^{PP}	5
Olga Smirnova	−55 kg	—N/a	Filipava (BLR); W 3–1 ^{PP}	Xu L (CHN); L 1–3 ^{PP}	Did not advance	Bye	Pavăl (ROU); L 1–3 ^{PP}	Did not advance	7
Yelena Shalygina	−63 kg	Bye	Kartashova (RUS); L 0–3 ^{PO}	Did not advance		Bye	Vaseva (BUL); W 3–0 ^{PO}	Legrand (FRA); W 3–1 ^{PP}	3rd place, bronze medalist(s)
Olga Zhanibekova	−72 kg	—N/a	Conceição (BRA); L 1–3 ^{PP}	Did not advance					13
