= Handball at the 2008 Summer Olympics – Women's team rosters =

2008 Women's Olympic handball tournament
Tournament details
- Host country: China
- Venues: 2 (in 1 host city)
- Dates: 9–23 August
- Teams: 12 (from 5 confederations)

Final positions
- Champions: Norway
- Runners-up: Russia
- Third place: South Korea
- Fourth place: Hungary

This is a list of the players who are on the rosters of the teams participating in the 2008 Beijing Olympics for women's handball.

== Group A ==
=== Angola ===
The following is the Angola roster in the women's handball tournament of the 2008 Summer Olympics.

Head coach: Jerónimo Neto

No.	Pos.	Name	Date of birth (age)	Height	App.	Goals	Club
1	GK	Maria Odeth Tavares	18 August 1976 (aged 31)	1.70 m	100		(Angola) 1º de Agosto
2	CB	Maria Teresa Eduardo	17 September 1973 (aged 34)	1.78 m	117	297	(Angola) ASA Handball
3	LB	Ilda Maria Bengue	30 October 1974 (aged 33)	1.78 m	143	308	(Angola) Petro Atlético
4	RB	Azenaide Carlos	14 June 1990 (aged 18)	1.74 m	6	7	(Angola) ASA Handball
5	RW	Filomena Trindade	26 September 1971 (aged 36)	1.65 m	152	503	(Angola) Petro Atlético
6	P	Bombo Calandula	23 February 1983 (aged 25)	1.78 m	26	57	(Angola) Petro Atlético
8	LB	Nair Almeida	23 January 1984 (aged 24)	1.80 m	79	151	(Angola) 1º de Agosto
9	LB	Wuta Dombaxe	5 April 1986 (aged 22)	1.68 m	19	132	(Angola) ASA Handball
10	LW	Isabel Fernandes	5 June 1985 (aged 23)	1.80 m	6	18	(Angola) Petro Atlético
12	GK	Maria Rosa Pedro	29 December 1982 (aged 25)	1.73 m	46		(Angola) Petro Atlético
13	CB	Luisa Kiala	25 January 1982 (aged 26)	1.79 m	66	158	(Angola) Petro Atlético
14	CB	Natalia Bernardo	25 December 1986 (aged 21)	1.70 m	37	67	(Angola) Petro Atlético
15	LW	Elisabeth Cailo	2 July 1987 (aged 21)	1.75 m	29	30	(Angola) 1º de Agosto
17	P	Elizabeth Viegas	20 January 1985 (aged 23)	1.78 m	13	10	(Angola) ASA Handball

=== China ===
The following is the China roster in the women's handball tournament of the 2008 Summer Olympics.

Head coach: (South Korea) Kang Jae-won

No.	Pos.	Name	Date of birth (age)	Height	App.	Goals	Club
1	GK	Liu Guini	28 May 1982 (aged 26)	1.76 m	50		(China) Shandong Weihai
2	RW	Wei Qiuxiang	15 February 1986 (aged 22)	1.75 m	30	182	(China) Jiangsu Guangzhou
3	P	Liu Yun	6 March 1982 (aged 26)	1.80 m	70	396	(China) Anhui Hefei
7	CB	Zhang Geng	9 March 1980 (aged 28)	1.76 m	50	216	(China) Guangdong Guangzhou
9	RW	Wang Min	14 June 1980 (aged 28)	1.74 m	60	197	(China) Shanghai Handball Team
10	LB	Wang Shasha	8 January 1987 (aged 21)	1.76 m	70	377	(China) Shandong Weihai
12	GK	Huang Hong	7 March 1980 (aged 28)	1.83 m	50		(China) Anhui Hefei
13	LW	Wu Yanan	14 September 1981 (aged 26)	1.70 m	65	226	(China) Beijing Army
14	RB	Liu Xiaomei	2 May 1985 (aged 23)	1.78 m	60	300	(China) Anhui Hefei
15	P	Sun Laimiao	8 April 1981 (aged 27)	1.76 m	50	168	(China) Anhui Hefei
18	CB	Wu Wenjuan	5 July 1981 (aged 27)	1.82 m	60	235	(China) Shanghai Handball Team
19	CB	Li Weiwei	7 July 1982 (aged 26)	1.79 m	60	364	(China) Beijing Army
21	LB	Li Bing	21 January 1980 (aged 28)	1.82 m	70	347	(China) Beijing Army
22	LW	Huang Dongjie	22 December 1981 (aged 26)	1.75 m	55	215	(China) Heilongjiang Harbin
23	RB	Yan Meizhu	28 January 1989 (aged 19)	1.87 m	30	85	(China) Beijing Handball Team

=== France ===
The following is the France roster in the women's handball tournament of the 2008 Summer Olympics.

Head coach: Olivier Krumbholz

No.	Pos.	Name	Date of birth (age)	Height	App.	Goals	Club
4	P	Nina Kamto Njitam	5 June 1983 (aged 25)	1.77 m	79	133	(France) Metz Handball
5	RB	Camille Ayglon	21 May 1985 (aged 23)	1.80 m	25	64	(France) HBC Nîmes
8	P	Véronique Pecqueux-Rolland	9 October 1972 (aged 35)	1.72 m	289	870	(France) Cercle Dijon Bourgogne
9	LW	Paule Baudouin	25 October 1984 (aged 23)	1.72 m	59	121	(France) Issy-les-Moulineaux
10	LB	Sophie Herbrecht	13 February 1982 (aged 26)	1.74 m	144	454	(France) Issy-les-Moulineaux
11	RW	Stéphanie Cano	17 April 1974 (aged 34)	1.60 m	231	462	(France) CA Bèglais Handball
12	GK	Amandine Leynaud	2 May 1986 (aged 22)	1.78 m	28		(France) Metz Handball
13	P	Isabelle Wendling	30 January 1971 (aged 37)	1.78 m	325	537	(France) Metz Handball
16	GK	Valérie Nicolas	12 March 1975 (aged 33)	1.78 m	234		(Denmark) Ikast-Brande Elite Håndbold
19	CB	Christine Vanparys-Torres	22 March 1978 (aged 30)	1.78 m	63	98	(France) Metz Handball
20	LW	Raphaëlle Tervel	21 April 1979 (aged 29)	1.78 m	155	263	(Spain) Akaba Bera Bera
21	RW	Maakan Tounkara	12 March 1983 (aged 25)	1.65 m	33	60	(France) Le Havre AC
23	RB	Alexandra Lacrabère	27 April 1987 (aged 21)	1.77 m	11	15	(France) CA Bèglais Handball
24	LB	Mariama Signaté	22 July 1985 (aged 23)	1.88 m	43	110	(France) CJF Fleury-Les-Aubrais

=== Kazakhstan ===
The following is the Kazakhstan roster in the women's handball tournament of the 2008 Summer Olympics.

Head coach: Lev Yaniyev

No.	Pos.	Name	Date of birth (age)	Height	App.	Goals	Club
2	CB	Xeniya Nikandrova	27 January 1987 (aged 21)	1.80 m			(Kazakhstan) Seikmun Kyzylorda
4	P	Irina Borechko	13 January 1972 (aged 36)	1.78 m	84	135	(Kazakhstan) Almaty Almaty
5	RB	Marina Pikalova	16 March 1985 (aged 23)	1.63 m	12	23	(Kazakhstan) Kazygurt Shymkent
7	LB	Gulzira Iskakova	4 November 1988 (aged 19)	1.70 m	3	4	(Kazakhstan) Seikmun Kyzylorda
10	P	Yelena Portova	5 September 1985 (aged 22)	1.85 m	14	37	(Kazakhstan) Kazygurt Shymkent
12	GK	Olga Travnikova	25 September 1970 (aged 37)	1.73 m	35	0	(Kazakhstan) Almaty Almaty
15	CB	Yelena Ilyukhina	24 June 1982 (aged 26)	1.70 m			(Kazakhstan) Seikmun Kyzylorda
16	GK	Tatiana Parfenova	1 June 1985 (aged 23)	1.80 m			(Kazakhstan) Seikmun Kyzylorda
17	LB	Nataliya Kubrina	15 January 1975 (aged 33)	1.73 m	77	190	(Kazakhstan) Almaty Almaty
19	RW	Nataliya Yakovleva	29 September 1986 (aged 21)	1.80 m	12	21	(Kazakhstan) Kazygurt Shymkent
20	P	Yana Vassilyeva	28 November 1981 (aged 26)	1.83 m	11	55	(Kazakhstan) Adil Ustkamenogorsk
21	RW	Olga Ajiderskaya	28 June 1982 (aged 26)	1.93 m	24	45	(Kazakhstan) Seikmun Kyzylorda
22	RB	Yuliya Markovich	11 July 1989 (aged 19)	1.73 m			(Kazakhstan) Seikmun Kyzylorda
24	LW	Yekaterina Tyapkova	2 July 1984 (aged 24)	1.88 m			(Kazakhstan) Seikmun Kyzylorda

=== Norway ===
The following is the Norway roster in the women's handball tournament of the 2008 Summer Olympics.

Head coach: Marit Breivik

No.	Pos.	Name	Date of birth (age)	Height	App.	Goals	Club
1	GK	Kari Aalvik Grimsbø	4 January 1985 (aged 23)	1.80 m	30	0	(Norway) Byåsen IL
3	LB	Katja Nyberg	24 August 1979 (aged 28)	1.83 m	92	304	(Denmark) Ikast-Bording EH
4	RW	Ragnhild Aamodt	9 September 1980 (aged 27)	1.63 m	111	276	(Denmark) Ikast-Bording EH
5	LB	Gøril Snorroeggen	15 February 1985 (aged 23)	1.78 m	60	151	(Norway) Byåsen IL
6	P	Else Marthe Sørlie Lybekk	11 September 1978 (aged 29)	1.78 m	207	567	(Norway) Nordstrand IF
7	RB	Tonje Nøstvold	7 May 1985 (aged 23)	1.78 m	73	140	(Denmark) Ikast-Bording EH
8	RB	Karoline Dyhre Breivang	10 May 1980 (aged 28)	1.73 m	147	282	(Norway) Larvik HK
9	LB	Kristine Lunde	30 March 1980 (aged 28)	1.83 m	110	349	(Denmark) Viborg HK
10	CB	Gro Hammerseng	10 April 1980 (aged 28)	1.80 m	139	559	(Denmark) Ikast-Bording EH
11	LW	Kari Mette Johansen	11 January 1979 (aged 29)	1.73 m	103	280	(Norway) Larvik HK
13	P	Marit Malm Frafjord	25 November 1986 (aged 21)	1.83 m	53	111	(Norway) Byåsen IL
14	LB	Tonje Larsen	26 January 1975 (aged 33)	1.83 m	220	453	(Norway) Larvik HK
16	GK	Katrine Lunde Haraldsen	30 March 1980 (aged 28)	1.80 m	111	1	(Denmark) Viborg HK
18	RB	Linn Kristin Riegelhuth	1 August 1984 (aged 24)	1.75 m	105	363	(Norway) Larvik HK

=== Romania ===
The following is the Romania roster in the women's handball tournament of the 2008 Summer Olympics.

Head coach: Gheorghe Tadici

No.	Pos.	Name	Date of birth (age)	Height	App.	Goals	Club
1	GK	Tereza Pislaru	28 April 1982 (aged 26)	1.87 m	90	0	(Romania) CS Oltchim Râmnicu Vâlcea
2	RW	Ramona Maier	14 July 1979 (aged 29)	1.70 m	132	405	(Romania) CS Oltchim Râmnicu Vâlcea
4	P	Florina Birsan	6 December 1985 (aged 22)	1.78 m	18	17	(Romania) U Jolidon Cluj Napoca
5	LB	Carmen Amariei	3 September 1978 (aged 29)	1.84 m	106	612	(Romania) U Jolidon Cluj Napoca
7	RW	Adriana Nechita-Olteanu	14 November 1983 (aged 24)	1.72 m	37	103	(Romania) CS Oltchim Râmnicu Vâlcea
8	LB	Cristina Neagu	26 August 1988 (aged 19)	1.75 m	28	95	(Romania) Rulmentul Braşov
9	LB	Aurelia Brădeanu	5 May 1979 (aged 29)	1.82 m	165	448	(Hungary) Győri Audi ETO KC
10	P	Ionela Stanca-Gâlcă	9 January 1981 (aged 27)	1.76 m	99	218	(Romania) Rulmentul Braşov
12	GK	Talida Tolnai	21 August 1979 (aged 28)	1.87 m	70	1	(Romania) CS Oltchim Râmnicu Vâlcea
15	LW	Valentina Ardean-Elisei	5 June 1982 (aged 26)	1.71 m	94	424	(Romania) CS Oltchim Râmnicu Vâlcea
16	GK	Luminiţa Dinu-Huţupan	6 November 1971 (aged 36)	1.83 m	168	7	(Romania) CS Oltchim Râmnicu Vâlcea
18	LB	Laura Meirosu	11 August 1985 (aged 22)	1.82 m	65	128	(Romania) CS Oltchim Râmnicu Vâlcea
19	CB	Valeria Motogna-Beșe	16 December 1979 (aged 28)	1.87 m	77	124	(Romania) CS Oltchim Râmnicu Vâlcea
25	CB	Mihaela Ani Senocico	14 December 1981 (aged 26)	1.74 m	58	84	(Romania) U Jolidon Cluj Napoca
99	LB	Narcisa Lecusanu	14 September 1976 (aged 31)	1.84 m	73	86	(Romania) CS Oltchim Râmnicu Vâlcea

== Group B ==
=== Brazil ===
The following is the Brazil roster in the women's handball tournament of the 2008 Summer Olympics.

Head coach: (Spain) Juan Oliver

No.	Pos.	Name	Date of birth (age)	Height	App.	Goals	Club
1	GK	Chana Masson	18 December 1978 (aged 29)	1.83 m	136	3	(Denmark) Randers HK
2	P	Fabiana Diniz	13 May 1981 (aged 27)	1.83 m	77	100	(Spain) BM Elda Prestigio
3	RW	Alexandra do Nascimento	16 September 1981 (aged 26)	1.77 m	74	170	(Austria) Hypo Niederösterreich
5	P	Daniela Piedade	2 March 1979 (aged 29)	1.73 m	78	134	(Austria) Hypo Niederösterreich
6	LB	Eduarda Amorim	23 September 1986 (aged 21)	1.86 m	40	120	(North Macedonia) Kometal Gjorče Petrov
7	P	Alessandra Oliveira	7 October 1981 (aged 26)	1.84 m	78	121	(Spain) SD Itxako
9	CB	Ana Paula Belo	18 October 1987 (aged 20)	1.72 m	15	35	(Spain) BM Roquetas
10	LW	Aline Rosas	28 June 1979 (aged 29)	1.60 m	105	201	(Brazil) AD Blumenau
11	RW	Viviane Jacques	10 May 1977 (aged 31)	1.70 m	180	260	(Spain) BM Elda Prestigio
13	CB	Lucila Silva	7 March 1976 (aged 32)	1.74 m	173	220	(Brazil) ABC Santo Andre
17	LW	Idalina Mesquita	2 July 1976 (aged 32)	1.71 m	149	326	(Austria) Hypo Niederösterreich
18	RB	Deonise Cavaleiro	20 June 1983 (aged 25)	1.80 m	42	104	(Spain) SD Itxako
19	LB	Aline Santos	17 August 1981 (aged 26)	1.95 m	90	221	(Germany) Frisch Auf Göppingen
23	GK	Darly de Paula	25 August 1982 (aged 25)	1.80 m	98	0	(France) Le Havre AC

=== Germany ===
The following is the Germany roster in the women's handball tournament of the 2008 Summer Olympics.

Head coach: Armin Emrich

No.	Pos.	Name	Date of birth (age)	Height	App.	Goals	Club
1	GK	Sabine Englert	27 November 1981 (aged 26)	1.84 m	139	2	(Austria) Hypo Niederösterreich
2	LW	Nadine Härdter	29 March 1981 (aged 27)	1.66 m	125	199	(Germany) Thüringer HC
4	RB	Grit Jurack	22 October 1977 (aged 30)	1.86 m	261	1377	(Denmark) Viborg HK
7	CB	Nina Wörz	14 November 1980 (aged 27)	1.79 m	134	252	(Denmark) Randers HK
8	RB	Anne Müller	5 July 1983 (aged 25)	1.76 m	84	119	(Germany) TSV Bayer 04 Leverkusen
9	LB	Laura Steinbach	2 August 1985 (aged 23)	1.80 m	9	16	(Germany) TSV Bayer 04 Leverkusen
10	CB	Anna Loerper	18 November 1984 (aged 23)	1.62 m	78	93	(Germany) TSV Bayer 04 Leverkusen
11	LW	Mandy Hering	11 March 1984 (aged 24)	1.70 m	42	80	(Germany) Frankfurter HC
13	LB	Nadine Krause	25 March 1982 (aged 26)	1.78 m	145	569	(Denmark) FCK Handball
15	RW	Sabrina Neukamp	10 May 1982 (aged 26)	1.73 m	70	101	(Germany) HSG Blomberg-Lippe
16	GK	Clara Woltering	2 May 1983 (aged 25)	1.75 m	83		(Germany) TSV Bayer 04 Leverkusen
18	CB	Maren Baumbach	14 January 1981 (aged 27)	1.70 m	115	333	(Denmark) FCK Handball
19	RB	Stefanie Melbeck	16 April 1977 (aged 31)	1.74 m	178	388	(Denmark) KIF Kolding
20	P	Anja Althaus	3 September 1982 (aged 25)	1.74 m	125	254	(Denmark) Viborg HK

=== Hungary ===
The following is the Hungary roster in the women's handball tournament of the 2008 Summer Olympics.

Head coach: János Hajdu

No.	Pos.	Name	Date of birth (age)	Height	App.	Goals	Club
2	CB	Bernadett Ferling	13 July 1977 (aged 31)	1.80 m	132	300	(Hungary) Dunaferr SE
6	LW	Orsolya Vérten	22 July 1982 (aged 26)	1.70 m	65	175	(Hungary) Győri Audi ETO KC
10	CB	Krisztina Pigniczki	18 September 1975 (aged 32)	1.71 m	143	224	(Hungary) Dunaferr SE
12	GK	Orsolya Herr	23 November 1984 (aged 23)	1.76 m	41	0	(Hungary) Győri Audi ETO KC
13	CB	Anita Görbicz	13 May 1983 (aged 25)	1.75 m	131	541	(Hungary) Győri Audi ETO KC
16	GK	Katalin Pálinger	6 December 1978 (aged 29)	1.83 m	212	1	(Hungary) Győri Audi ETO KC
17	LB	Tímea Tóth	16 September 1980 (aged 27)	1.82 m	111	333	(Austria) Hypo Niederösterreich
18	P	Piroska Szamoránszky	9 July 1986 (aged 22)	1.72 m	45	118	(Hungary) Budapest Bank-FTC
22	RW	Bernadett Bódi	9 March 1986 (aged 22)	1.75 m	5	9	(Denmark) Randers HK
23	LB	Gabriella Szűcs	31 August 1984 (aged 23)	1.84 m	66	101	(Hungary) DVSC-Aquaticum
26	P	Rita Borbás	21 December 1980 (aged 27)	1.67 m	59	106	(Romania) CS Oltchim Vâlcea
31	RB	Ágnes Hornyák	2 September 1982 (aged 25)	1.80 m	60	44	(Hungary) Győri Audi ETO KC
83	RW	Mónika Kovacsicz	20 November 1983 (aged 24)	1.70 m	45	130	(Denmark) Viborg HK
87	LB	Zsuzsanna Tomori	18 June 1987 (aged 21)	1.87 m	24	24	(Hungary) Győri Audi ETO KC

=== South Korea ===
The following is the South Korea roster in the women's handball tournament of the 2008 Summer Olympics.

Head coach: Lim Young-chul

No.	Pos.	Name	Date of birth (age)	Height	App.	Goals	Club
1	GK	Oh Yong-ran	6 September 1972 (aged 35)	1.71 m			(South Korea) Byucksan Construction Incheon
3	CB	Kim On-a	6 September 1988 (aged 19)	1.67 m			(South Korea) Byucksan Construction Incheon
4	P	Huh Soon-young	28 September 1975 (aged 32)	1.80 m			(Denmark) SK Aarhus
6	LB	Song Hai-rim	12 January 1985 (aged 23)	1.67 m			(South Korea) Daegu Metropolitan City
7	LW	Kim Nam-sun	3 May 1981 (aged 27)	1.70 m			(South Korea) Byucksan Construction Incheon
9	P	Kim Cha-youn	10 February 1981 (aged 27)	1.73 m			(Austria) Hypo Niederösterreich
10	CB	Oh Seong-ok	10 October 1972 (aged 35)	1.71 m			(Austria) Hypo Niederösterreich
11	RB	Hong Jeong-ho	6 May 1974 (aged 34)	1.78 m			(Japan) Omron
13	RW	Park Chung-hee	10 April 1975 (aged 33)	1.78 m			(South Korea) Byucksan Construction Incheon
16	GK	Lee Min-hee	4 February 1980 (aged 28)	1.74 m			(South Korea) Yongin City Hall
17	LW	An Jung-hwa	20 February 1981 (aged 27)	1.62 m			(South Korea) Daegu Metropolitan City
18	RW	Bae Min-hee	11 July 1988 (aged 20)	1.69 m			(South Korea) Korea National Sport University
19	RB	Choi Im-jeong	14 February 1981 (aged 27)	1.80 m			(Denmark) SK Aarhus
20	LB	Moon Pil-hee	2 December 1982 (aged 25)	1.68 m			(South Korea) Byucksan Construction Incheon

=== Russia ===
The following is the Russia roster in the women's handball tournament of the 2008 Summer Olympics.

Head coach: Yevgeni Trefilov

No.	Pos.	Name	Date of birth (age)	Height	App.	Goals	Club
1	GK	Inna Suslina	5 January 1979 (aged 29)	1.83 m			(Russia) Zvezda Zvenigorod
3	CB	Irina Poltoratskaya	2 March 1979 (aged 29)	1.78 m			(Russia) Zvezda Zvenigorod
4	P	Oxana Romenskaya	6 June 1976 (aged 32)	1.91 m			(Russia) Zvezda Zvenigorod
5	LB	Lyudmila Postnova	11 August 1984 (aged 23)	1.80 m			(Russia) Lada Togliatti
6	LB	Anna Kareyeva	10 May 1977 (aged 31)	1.85 m			(Russia) Zvezda Zvenigorod
8	CB	Yekaterina Andryushina	17 August 1985 (aged 22)	1.85 m			(Russia) Zvezda Zvenigorod
9	RW	Yana Uskova	28 September 1985 (aged 22)	1.68 m			(Slovenia) Krim Ljubljana
10	LB	Yelena Polenova	20 August 1983 (aged 24)	1.98 m			(Russia) Zvezda Zvenigorod
11	LW	Emiliia Turei	6 October 1984 (aged 23)	1.74 m			(Denmark) Slagelse Dream Team
12	P	Natalia Shipilova	31 December 1979 (aged 28)	1.81 m			(Russia) Zvezda Zvenigorod
16	GK	Maria Sidorova	21 November 1979 (aged 28)	1.78 m			(Russia) Lada Togliatti
17	LW	Yekaterina Marennikova	29 April 1982 (aged 26)	1.73 m			(Russia) Lada Togliatti
19	LW	Yelena Dmitriyeva	1 July 1983 (aged 25)	1.75 m			(Russia) Zvezda Zvenigorod
24	RB	Irina Bliznova	6 October 1986 (aged 21)	1.80 m			(Russia) Lada Togliatti

=== Sweden ===
The following is the Sweden roster in the women's handball tournament of the 2008 Summer Olympics.

Head coach: Ulf Schefvert

No.	Pos.	Name	Date of birth (age)	Height	App.	Goals	Club
3	P	Tina Flognman	29 June 1981 (aged 27)	1.78 m	127	266	(Denmark) GOG Svendborg
4	LW	Matilda Boson	4 December 1981 (aged 26)	1.76 m	115	271	(Denmark) Aalborg DH
5	P	Sara Holmgren	29 March 1979 (aged 29)	1.81 m	96	106	(Germany) HC Leipzig
6	CB	Therese Islas Helgesson	22 July 1983 (aged 25)	1.68 m	44	66	(Norway) Nordstrand IF
7	RW	Annika Wiel Fredén	21 August 1978 (aged 29)	1.76 m	52	135	(Denmark) Horsens HK
9	P	Frida Toveby	29 July 1982 (aged 26)	1.74 m	7	7	(Denmark) Aalborg DH
10	RW	Teresa Utković	31 July 1980 (aged 28)	1.70 m	55	128	(Sweden) IK Sävehof
11	CB	Jessica Enström	25 March 1977 (aged 31)	1.72 m	113	220	(Sweden) IVH Västerås
12	GK	Therese Bengtsson	13 February 1979 (aged 29)	1.87 m	21	0	(Sweden) Eslövs IK
14	RB	Sara Eriksson	13 April 1981 (aged 27)	1.82 m	96	152	(Germany) HC Leipzig
15	LB	Johanna Ahlm	3 October 1987 (aged 20)	1.75 m	22	64	(Sweden) IK Sävehof
16	GK	Madeleine Grundström	12 August 1980 (aged 27)	1.82 m	122	0	(Denmark) Aalborg DH
17	LB	Linnea Torstensson	30 March 1983 (aged 25)	1.86 m	38	145	(Denmark) Aalborg DH
18	P	Johanna Wiberg	6 September 1983 (aged 24)	1.85 m	63	52	(Denmark) FCK Håndbold
20	CB	Isabella Gulldén	29 June 1989 (aged 19)	1.79 m	5	3	(Sweden) IK Sävehof
