= Sushil Kumar =

Indian wrestler (born 1983)

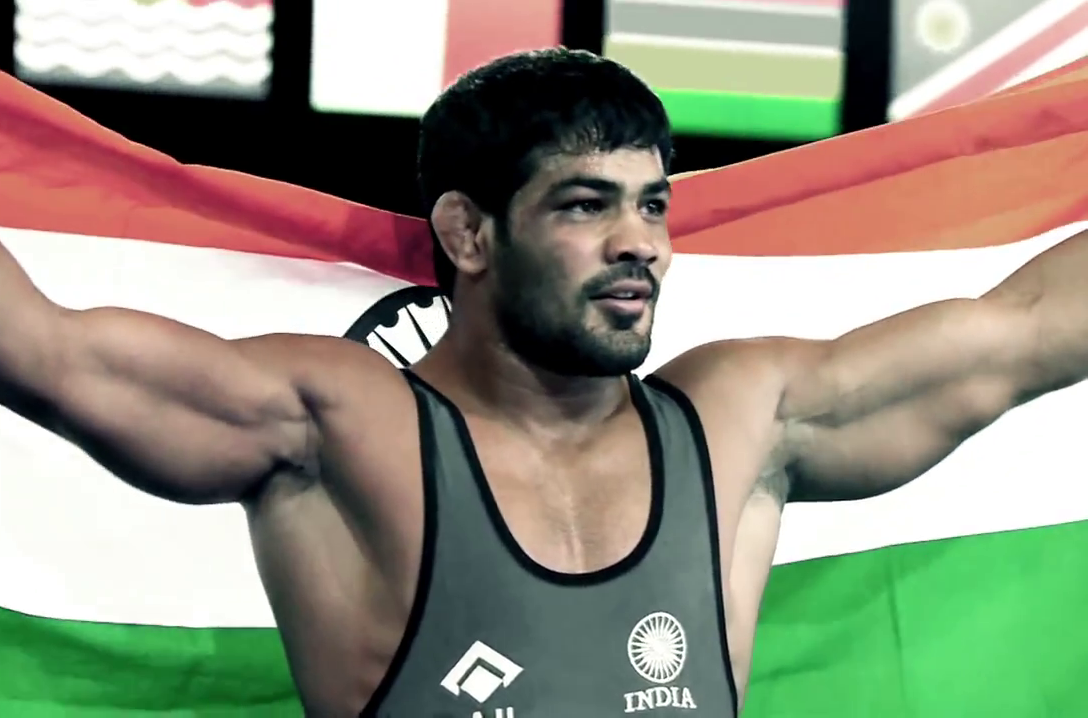
- Kumar in 2014

Personal information
- Born: 20 April 1983 (age 43) Delhi, India
- Education: Master of Physical Education; Bachelor of Physical Education; Noida College of Physical Education
- Occupation: Senior Commercial Manager
- Employer: Indian Railways
- Height: 1.66 m (5 ft 5 in)
- Criminal information
- Convictions: Murder (1 count); Rioting (1 count); Criminal conspiracy (1 count)

Details
- Date apprehended: 23 May 2021

Sport
- Sport: Wrestling
- Event: Freestyle
- Coached by: Satpal Singh
Medal record
Men's freestyle wrestling
Representing India
| Event | 1st | 2nd | 3rd |
|---|---|---|---|
| Olympic Games | - | 1 | 1 |
| World Championships | 1 | - | - |
| Asian Games | - | - | 1 |
| Asian Championships | 1 | 1 | 2 |
| Commonwealth Games | 3 | - | - |
| Commonwealth Championships | 5 | - | - |
| Total | 10 | 2 | 4 |
Olympic Games
| Silver medal – second place | 2012 London | 66kg |
| Bronze medal – third place | 2008 Beijing | 66kg |
World Championships
| Gold medal – first place | 2010 Moscow | 66kg |
Asian Games
| Bronze medal – third place | 2006 Doha | 66kg |
Asian Championships
| Gold medal – first place | 2010 New Delhi | 66kg |
| Silver medal – second place | 2007 Bishkek | 66kg |
| Bronze medal – third place | 2003 New Delhi | 60kg |
| Bronze medal – third place | 2008 Jeju | 66kg |
Commonwealth Games
| Gold medal – first place | 2010 Delhi | 66kg |
| Gold medal – first place | 2014 Glasgow | 74kg |
| Gold medal – first place | 2018 Gold Coast | 74kg |
Commonwealth Championships
| Gold medal – first place | 2003 London | 60kg |
| Gold medal – first place | 2005 Stellenbosch | 66kg |
| Gold medal – first place | 2007 London | 66kg |
| Gold medal – first place | 2009 Jalandhar | 66kg |
| Gold medal – first place | 2017 Johannesburg | 74kg |

Sushil Kumar (born 26 May 1983) is a former Indian freestyle wrestler. He is a two-time Olympic medallist who won a bronze at the 2008 Beijing Olympics, India's first wrestling medal since K. D. Jadhav in 1952, and a silver at the 2012 London Olympics. He was the first Indian to win a gold medal at the World Wrestling Championships. Kumar participated in the Queen's Baton Relay at the 2010 Commonwealth Games and was India's flag bearer at the 2012 London Olympics. He was conferred the Arjuna Award in 2005, Khel Ratna in 2009 and the Padma Shri in 2011.

== Career ==
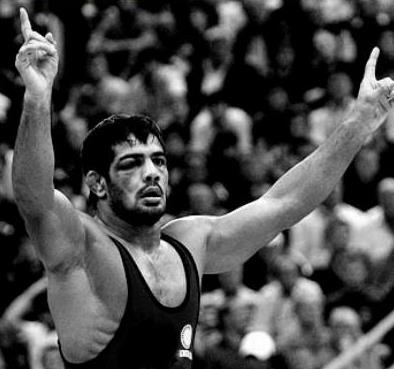
Kumar at 2008 Summer Olympics

Kumar started training in pehlwani at the Chhatrasal Stadium's akhada at the age of 14. He was trained at the akhada by Yashvir and Ramphal, later by Arjuna awardee Satpal and then at the Indian Railways camp by Gyan Singh and Rajkumar Baisla.

After switching to freestyle wrestling Kumar's first success came at the World Cadet Games in 1998 where he won the gold medal in his weight category, followed by a gold at the Asian Junior Wrestling Championship in 2000. Moving out of the junior competitions, in 2003 Kumar won the bronze medal at the Asian Wrestling Championships and a gold at the Commonwealth Wrestling Championships. Kumar placed fourth at the 2003 World Championships, but this went largely unnoticed by the Indian media as he fared badly in the 2004 Olympic Games in Athens, placing 14th in the 60 kg weight class. He won gold medals at the Commonwealth wrestling Championships in 2005 and 2007. He placed seventh in the 2007 World Championships and won a bronze medal at the 2008 Olympic Games in Beijing. He won a silver medal at the 2012 Summer Olympics, becoming the first person to win two Olympic medals for independent India. Kumar was awarded the Arjuna Award in 2006 and a coveted Padma Shree by the Indian Government in 2011.

=== 2008 Beijing Olympics ===
Kumar lost to Andriy Stadnik in the first round of the 66 kg freestyle wrestling event, leaving his medal hopes hinging on the repechage. He defeated Doug Schwab in the first repechage round and Albert Batyrov in the second round. In the bronze medal match on 20 August 2008, Kumar beat Leonid Spiridonov 3:1. Kumar disclosed that he had no masseur during the three bouts he won within a span of 70 minutes to take the bronze. The team manager Kartar Singh who is a former Asian Games medallist acted as the masseur for him between the bouts.

=== 2010 World Wrestling Championships, Moscow ===
At the 2010 World Wrestling Championships Kumar became the first Indian to win a world title in wrestling. He beat the local favourite Alan Gogaev of Russia 3–1 in the finals in the 66 kg category.

=== 2010 Commonwealth Games, Delhi ===
Kumar won gold medal at the 2010 Commonwealth Games held in Delhi on 10 October 2010. He beat Heinrich Barnes 7–0 in the finals in the 66 kg freestyle wrestling category. The bout was stopped by the referee in the second round. Earlier, in the semifinals, Kumar defeated Famara Jarjou 3–0 within 9 seconds. In the quarterfinals, Kumar defeated Pakistani opponent Muhammad Salman 10–0 in 46 seconds.

=== 2012 London Olympics ===
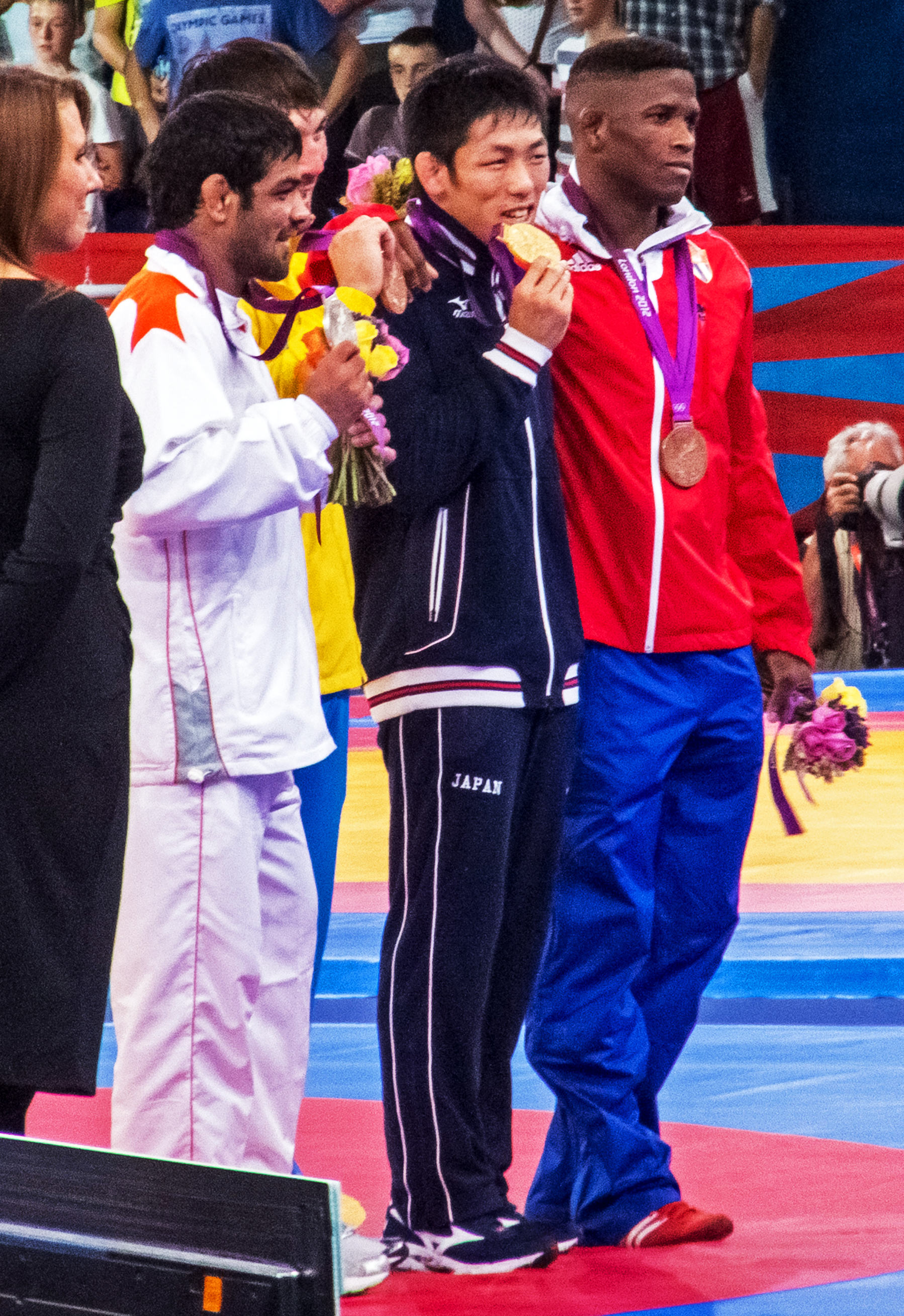
Kumar (left) at the 2012 Olympics

Kumar won a silver medal after losing the final to Tatsuhiro Yonemitsu. Earlier, he had entered the final amid some controversy by beating Kazakhastan's Akzhurek Tanatarov in the semifinal. The Kazakh athlete claimed Kumar had bitten his ear, which was denied by the latter. Kumar was the Olympic flag bearer for India at the opening ceremony. This win made him the first Indian to win 2 individual Olympic medals since India's independence.

=== 2014 Commonwealth Games, Glasgow ===
Kumar defeated Qamar Abbas in the 74 kg final to win the gold medal at the 2014 Commonwealth Games in Glasgow, Scotland. He won in 107 seconds by fall.

=== 2018 Commonwealth Games, Gold Coast, Australia ===
Kumar won gold in 74 kg category on 12 April 2018, Thursday, beating South Africa's Johannes Botha in the final that lasted 80 seconds thus achieving a feat of winning 3 gold medals in 3 consecutive Commonwealth Games.

== International competition ==
=== Summer Olympics ===
| Year | Competition | Venue | Event | Rank | opponent | Score | Repechage opponent | Score |
|---|---|---|---|---|---|---|---|---|
| 2012 | 2012 Olympic Games | London | 66 kg | 2nd place, silver medalist(s) | Tatsuhiro Yonemitsu (JPN) | Loss | | |
| 2008 | 2008 Olympic Games | Beijing | 66 kg | 3rd place, bronze medalist(s) | Andriy Stadnik (UKR) | Loss | Leonid Spiridonov (KAZ) | Win |
| 2004 | 2004 Olympic Games | Athens | 60 kg | 14th | Yandro Quintana (CUB) | Loss | | |

=== World Championship ===
| Year | Competition | Venue | Event | Rank | opponent | Score | Repechage | Score |
|---|---|---|---|---|---|---|---|---|
| 2019 | 2019 World Wrestling Championships | Nur-Sultan | 74 kg | 20th | Khadzhimurad Gadzhiyev (AZE) | Loss | | |
| 2011 | 2011 World Wrestling Championships | Istanbul | 66 kg | 14th | Andriy Stadnik (UKR) | Loss | | |
| 2010 | 2010 World Wrestling Championships | Moscow | 66 kg | 1st place, gold medalist(s) | Alan Gogaev (RUS) | Win | | |
| 2009 | 2009 World Wrestling Championships | Herning | 66 kg | 5th | Rasul Dzhukayev (RUS) | Loss | Tatsuhiro Yonemitsu (JPN) | Loss |
| 2007 | 2007 World Wrestling Championships | Baku | 66 kg | 7th | Andriy Stadnik (UKR) | Loss | | |
| 2006 | 2006 World Wrestling Championships | Guangzhou | 66 kg | 13th | Elman Asgarov (AZE) | Loss | | |
| 2003 | 2003 World Wrestling Championships | New York City | 60 kg | 4th | Arif Abdullayev (AZE) | Loss | | |

== Personal life ==
Kumar was born in a Jat family in Baprola village, near Najafgarh in South West Delhi. His father, Diwan Singh, was a driver in MTNL Delhi, while his mother, Kamla Devi, is a housewife.

Kumar was inspired to take up wrestling by his father, himself a wrestler, and his cousin Sandeep Solanki. Sandeep later stopped competing as the family could only support one wrestler. Kumar trained in pehlwani wrestling at the akhada (wrestling school) in the Chhatrasal Stadium from the age of 14. With minimal funds and poor training facilities for wrestling in India, even for the 2008 Olympic team, his family made sure he obtained the necessary dietary supplements by sending him tinned milk, ghee and fresh vegetables. He is a devoted Hindu and a strict vegetarian.

He completed his Graduation (B.P.E.) and Post-Graduation (M.P.E.) from the Noida College of Physical Education, Dadri. Kumar is presently employed with the Northern Railways as a Senior Commercial Manager.

== Commercial endorsements and media ==
"I didn’t want to be associated with a liquor brand in any form as it would send a wrong signal to the youth. The sporting tradition that I have been raised in values discipline way above money."

— Sushil Kumar explaining reason for refusing a liquor ad.

Kumar endorses brands such as Mountain Dew, Eicher tractors, and the National Egg Coordination Committee which earns him ₹10 million (US$110,000) annually. He refused the offer of ₹5 million (US$53,000) to appear in a surrogate ad for a leading liquor brand.

He appeared in the Indian documentary film Carve Your Destiny by Anubhav Srivastava. Kumar also served as a judge on MTV India's reality television series MTV Roadies. Other media appearances include in The Kapil Sharma Show and Comedy Nights with Kapil.

== Awards, rewards and recognition ==
- Arjuna Award, 2005
- Major Dhyan Chand Khel Ratna award (joint), India's highest sporting honour.
- Padma Shri, 2011

For the bronze medal at 2008 Beijing Olympics

- ₹5.5 million (US$59,000) cash award and promotion to Assistant Commercial Manager from chief ticketing inspector by Railway Ministry (his employer)
- ₹5 million (US$53,000) cash award from the Delhi Government.
- ₹2.5 million (US$27,000) award by the Haryana Government.
- ₹2.5 million (US$27,000) cash award by the Steel Ministry of India.
- ₹500,000 (US$5,300) cash award by R K Global
- DSP Rank in the Haryana Police.
- ₹1 million (US$11,000) cash award by the Maharashtra State Government.
- ₹1 million (US$11,000) cash award from MTNL.

For the gold medal at 2010 World Wrestling Championships

- ₹1 million (US$11,000) cash award from Indian Railways (his employer) & out-of-turn promotion from his current position of Asst. Commercial Manager.
- ₹1 million (US$11,000) cash award from Sports Authority of India (Government of India).
- ₹1 million (US$11,000) cash award from the Delhi Government.

For the silver medal at 2012 London Olympics

- ₹20 million (US$210,000) cash reward from the Delhi Government.
- ₹15 million (US$160,000) cash reward from the Haryana Government.
- ₹7.5 million (US$80,000) cash reward from the Indian Railways.
- Land in Sonipat for a Wrestling academy by the Haryana Government.
- ₹1 million (US$11,000) cash award from ONGC.

== Criminal case and Controversies ==
Sushil Kumar
- Criminal charge: Murder

Details
- Date apprehended: 23 May 2021
- Imprisoned at: Tihar Jail, Delhi

The Delhi Police arrested Sushil Kumar in connection with the murder of former junior national wrestling champion Sagar Dhankhar during a brawl in the Chhatrasal Stadium on 4 May 2021. After arresting Kumar, Delhi Police presented him at the Rohini District Court where he was placed in a six-day remand. In October 2021, a judge ordered Kumar continue to be held without bail. The decision was reached after arguments from both sides, and a review of evidence from the prosecution, including a video taken by an alleged accomplice of a man purported to be Kumar engaged in the attack. In March 2025, the Delhi High Court granted regular bail to Kumar, citing his prolonged incarceration and the absence of direct evidence linking him to the murder. In July 2025, after being granted bail, Sushil Kumar officially resumed duty with Northern Railway, where he is currently serving as Senior Commercial Manager. On 13 August 2025, the Supreme Court of India cancelled Kumar's bail over concerns of witness intimidation and trial interference, directing him to surrender within a week.

== See also ==
- India at the 2008 Summer Olympics
- Wrestling at the 2008 Summer Olympics – Men's freestyle 66 kg
- Wrestling at the 2012 Summer Olympics – Men's freestyle 66 kg
- Wrestling

Olympic Games
| Preceded by Rajyavardhan Singh Rathore | Flagbearer for India; 2012 London | Succeeded by Abhinav Bindra |
