= 2010 World Wrestling Championships – Men's freestyle 66 kg =

Men's freestyle 66 kg at the 2010 World Championships
- Venue: Olympic Stadium
- Dates: 12 September 2010
- Competitors: 35 from 35 nations

Medalists
gold medal	Sushil Kumar	India
silver medal	Alan Gogaev	Russia
bronze medal	Jabrayil Hasanov	Azerbaijan
bronze medal	Geandry Garzón	Cuba

The men's freestyle 66 kilograms is a competition featured at the 2010 World Wrestling Championships, and was held at the Olympic Stadium in Moscow, Russia on 12 September.

== Results ==
Legend

- F — Won by fall

=== Finals ===
Semifinals				Final
Jabrayil Hasanov (AZE)	1	0	2
Sushil Kumar (IND)	0	1	3	Sushil Kumar (IND)	2	1
Geandry Garzón (CUB)	0	0		Alan Gogaev (RUS)	1	0
Alan Gogaev (RUS)	3	1

=== Top half ===
==== Section 1 ====
Round of 64

Round of 32
Ismail Redzhep (BUL)	1	7^{F}
Raimondo Campagna (ITA)	3	3
Heinrich Barnes (RSA)	7	6
Ramazan Kambarow (TKM)	0	0
Dejan Mitrov (MKD)	1	4
Elar Hani (EST)	0	0
Vladimir Gotişan (MDA)	1	0
Jabrayil Hasanov (AZE)	4	1

Round of 16
Ismail Redzhep (BUL)	0	0
Heinrich Barnes (RSA)	6	6
Dejan Mitrov (MKD)	0	0
Jabrayil Hasanov (AZE)	2	6

Quarterfinals
Heinrich Barnes (RSA)	0	0
Jabrayil Hasanov (AZE)	7	7

==== Section 2 ====
Round of 64

Round of 32
Otar Tushishvili (GEO)	1	2
Brent Metcalf (USA)	0	2
Buyanjavyn Batzorig (MGL)	2	6
Nicolae Cojocaru (ROU)	0	0
Martin Daum (GER)	2	1
Shan Chengde (CHN)	0	0
Anastasios Akritidis (GRE)	0	0
Sushil Kumar (IND)	4	2

Round of 16
Otar Tushishvili (GEO)	0	0
Buyanjavyn Batzorig (MGL)	1	3^{F}
Martin Daum (GER)	1	0
Sushil Kumar (IND)	2	2

Quarterfinals
Buyanjavyn Batzorig (MGL)	0	1
Sushil Kumar (IND)	6	3

=== Bottom half ===
==== Section 3 ====
Round of 64

Round of 32
Zhirayr Hovhannisyan (ARM)	2	2
Albert Batyrov (BLR)	0	2
Geandry Garzón (CUB)	1	2
Tatsuhiro Yonemitsu (JPN)	0	1
Ramazan Şahin (TUR)	3	0
Andriy Stadnik (UKR)	6	5
Mehdi Taghavi (IRI)	1	4
Ikhtiyor Navruzov (UZB)	0	2

Round of 16
Zhirayr Hovhannisyan (ARM)	2	0
Geandry Garzón (CUB)	4	2
Andriy Stadnik (UKR)	0	0
Mehdi Taghavi (IRI)	1	6

Quarterfinals
Geandry Garzón (CUB)	2	1
Mehdi Taghavi (IRI)	0	0

==== Section 4 ====
Round of 64
Alan Gogaev (RUS)	2	2
Yoan Blanco (ECU)	0	0
Gulom Sharipov (TJK)	0	1
Yuri Poliak (ISR)	4	3
Abdou Omar (EGY)	8	6
Andrei Paulet (NZL)	0	0

Round of 32
Kim Dai-sung (KOR)	3	5
Jakub Kačeňák (SVK)	0	0
Akzhurek Tanatarov (KAZ)	8^{F}
Melchor Manibusan (GUM)	0
Haislan Garcia (CAN)	0	1	0
Alan Gogaev (RUS)	1	1	1
Yuri Poliak (ISR)	1	1
Abdou Omar (EGY)	1	0

Round of 16
Kim Dai-sung (KOR)	4	1
Akzhurek Tanatarov (KAZ)	1	0
Alan Gogaev (RUS)	1	3
Yuri Poliak (ISR)	0	1

Quarterfinals
Kim Dai-sung (KOR)	0	0
Alan Gogaev (RUS)	1	2

=== Repechage ===
Repechage round 1
Yoan Blanco (ECU)	0	1	0
Haislan Garcia (CAN)	1	0	1

Repechage round 2
Anastasios Akritidis (GRE)	1	0
Martin Daum (GER)	3	2
Haislan Garcia (CAN)	1	1
Yuri Poliak (ISR)	0	0

Repechage round 3
Martin Daum (GER)	2	1
Buyanjavyn Batzorig (MGL)	2	8
Haislan Garcia (CAN)	1	2
Kim Dai-sung (KOR)	0	0

Bronze medals
Buyanjavyn Batzorig (MGL)	1	0
Jabrayil Hasanov (AZE)	2	3
Haislan Garcia (CAN)	2	0
Geandry Garzón (CUB)	3	1
