= Elena Proskurakova =

Kyrgyzstani judoka (b. 1985)

Personal information
- Native name: Елена Борисовна Проскуракова
- Full name: Elena Borisovna Proskurakova
- Nationality: Kyrgyzstan
- Born: 19 April 1985 (age 41) Karakol, Kirghiz SSR
- Height: 1.70 m (5 ft 7 in)
- Weight: 78 kg (172 lb)

Sport
- Sport: Judo
- Event: 78 kg

Elena Borisovna Proskurakova (Russian: Елена Борисовна Проскуракова; born April 19, 1985, in Karakol) is a Kyrgyzstani judoka, who played for the half-heavyweight category.

== Career ==
She is a five-time national judo champion for the 63 and 70 kg class. She also placed fifth at the 2011 Asian Judo Championships in Abu Dhabi, losing out to Japan's Yoshie Ueno in the bronze medal bout.

Proskurakova represented Kyrgyzstan at the 2008 Summer Olympics in Beijing, where she competed for the women's 78 kg class. She lost her first preliminary match to China's Yang Xiuli, who scored an automatic ippon at fifty-two seconds. Because Yang advanced further into the final match against Cuba's Yalennis Castillo, Proskurakova offered another shot for the bronze medal through the repechage bouts, where she was defeated by Mongolia's Pürevjargalyn Lkhamdegd, who scored a waza-ari awasete ippon (half full point) in the first round.
