= Judo at the 2008 Summer Olympics – Women's 78 kg =

Women's 78 kg at the Games of the XXIX Olympiad
- Venue: Beijing Science and Technology; University Gymnasium
- Date: August 14, 2008
- Competitors: 21 from 21 nations
- Winning score: 0000

Medalists
1st place, gold medalist(s)		Yang Xiuli	China
2nd place, silver medalist(s)		Yalennis Castillo	Cuba
3rd place, bronze medalist(s)		Jeong Gyeong-Mi	South Korea
3rd place, bronze medalist(s)		Stéphanie Possamaï	France

The women's 78 kg (also known as half-heavyweight) tournament in the judo at the 2008 Summer Olympics was held on August 14 at the Beijing Science and Technology University Gymnasium. A total of 21 women competed in this event, limited to jūdōka with a body weight of less than 78 kilograms. Preliminary rounds started at 12:00 Noon CST. Repechage finals, semifinals, bouts for bronze medals and the final were held at 18:00 p.m. CST.

This event was the second-heaviest of the women's judo weight classes, limiting competitors to a maximum of 78 kilograms of body mass. Like all other judo events, bouts lasted five minutes. If the bout was still tied at the end, it was extended for another five-minute, sudden-death period; if neither judoka scored during that period, the match is decided by the judges. The tournament bracket consisted of a single-elimination contest culminating in a gold medal match. There was also a repechage to determine the winners of the two bronze medals. Each judoka who had lost to a semifinalist competed in the repechage. The two judokas who lost in the semifinals faced the winner of the opposite half of the bracket's repechage in bronze medal bouts.

== Qualifying athletes ==
Mat	Athlete	Country
1	Stephanie Grant	Australia
1	Marylise Levesque	Canada
1	Pürevjargalyn Lkhamdegd	Mongolia
1	Yang Xiuli	China
1	Elena Proskurakova	Kyrgyzstan
1	Lucia Morico	Italy
1	Sae Nakazawa	Japan
1	Edinanci Silva	Brazil
1	Vera Moskalyuk	Russia
1	Esther San Miguel	Spain
2	Heide Wollert	Germany
2	Maryna Pryshchepa	Ukraine
2	Vivian Yusuf	Nigeria
2	Michelle Rogers	Great Britain
2	Jeong Gyeong-Mi	South Korea
2	Sagat Abikeyeva	Kazakhstan
2	Yalennis Castillo	Cuba
2	Divya	India
2	Houda Miled	Tunisia
2	Stéphanie Possamaï	France
2	Lorena Briceño	Argentina

== Tournament results ==
=== Final ===
Final
1	Yang Xiuli (CHN)	0000
2	Yalennis Castillo (CUB)	0000

=== Mat 1 ===
Round of 32
Yang Xiuli (CHN)	1000
Elena Proskurakova (KGZ)	0000
Vera Moskalyuk (RUS)	0000
Esther San Miguel (ESP)	0002

Round of 16
Stephanie Grant (AUS)	0000
Marylise Levesque (CAN)	1000
Pürevjargalyn Lkhamdegd (MGL)	0000
Yang Xiuli (CHN)	1021
Lucia Morico (ITA)	0010
Sae Nakazawa (JPN)	0001
Edinanci Silva (BRA)	0010
Esther San Miguel (ESP)	0011

Quarterfinals
Marylise Levesque (CAN)	0000
Yang Xiuli (CHN)	1000
Lucia Morico (ITA)	0011
Esther San Miguel (ESP)	0220

Semifinals
Yang Xiuli (CHN)	1031
Esther San Miguel (ESP)	0000

=== Mat 2 ===
First Round
Heide Wollert (GER)	0011
Maryna Pryshchepa (UKR)	0010
Sagat Abikeyeva (KAZ)	0000
Yalennis Castillo (CUB)	1021
Stéphanie Possamaï (FRA)	0001
Lorena Briceño (ARG)	0000

Round of 16
Heide Wollert (GER)	1000
Vivian Yusuf (NGR)	0000
Michelle Rogers (GBR)	0000
Jeong Gyeong-Mi (KOR)	0001
Yalennis Castillo (CUB)	1000
Divya (IND)	0000
Houda Miled (TUN)	0012
Stéphanie Possamaï (FRA)	1010

Quarterfinals
Heide Wollert (GER)	0000
Jeong Gyeong-Mi (KOR)	1002
Yalennis Castillo (CUB)	0030
Stéphanie Possamaï (FRA)	0000

Semifinals
Jeong Gyeong-Mi (KOR)	0000
Yalennis Castillo (CUB)	0001

=== Repechage ===
First round
Elena Proskurakova (KGZ)	0000
Pürevjargalyn Lkhamdegd (MGL)	0230
Vera Moskalyuk (RUS)	0000
Edinanci Silva (BRA)	0021
Michelle Rogers (GBR)
BYE
Sagat Abikeyeva (KAZ)	1010
Divya Tewar (IND)	0000

Second round
Marylise Levesque (CAN)	0101
Pürevjargalyn Lkhamdegd (MGL)	0110
Lucia Morico (ITA)	0000
Edinanci Silva (BRA)	1101
Heide Wollert (GER)	0010
Michelle Rogers (GBR)	0001
Stéphanie Possamaï (FRA)	1010
Sagat Abikeyeva (KAZ)	0001

Third round
Pürevjargalyn Lkhamdegd (MGL)	0010
Edinanci Silva (BRA)	1131
Heide Wollert (GER)	0000
Stéphanie Possamaï (FRA)	0200

Bronze medal finals
Jeong Gyeong-Mi (KOR)	1010
Edinanci Silva (BRA)	0000
Esther San Miguel (ESP)	0010
Stéphanie Possamaï (FRA)	0100
