= Stephanie Grant =

Australian Olympic judoka

Personal information
- Nationality: Australia
- Born: 21 March 1987 (age 39) Hobart, Tasmania, Australia
- Height: 1.73 m (5 ft 8 in)
- Weight: 78 kg (172 lb)

Sport
- Sport: Judo
- Event: 78 kg
- Club: University of Tasmania Judo Club
- Coached by: Milos Kovacik

Stephanie Grant (born 21 March 1987 in Hobart, Tasmania) is an Australian judoka, who played for the half-heavyweight category. She is a member of the University of Tasmania Judo Club, under her personal coach Milos Kovacik, and has twice been the Australian judo champion.

Grant represented Australia at the 2008 Summer Olympics in Beijing, where she competed for the women's half-heavyweight class (78 kg). She received a bye for the second preliminary round match, before losing to Marylise Levesque of Canada, who successfully scored an ippon (full point) and an osotogari (big outer reap), at one minute and ten seconds.
