= Ilyukhin =

Ilyukhin (Russian: Илюхин) is a Russian masculine surname; its feminine counterpart is Ilyukhina. It may refer to

- Mikhail Ilyukhin (born 1966), Russian mixed martial artist
- Viktor Ilyukhin (1949–2011), Russian politician
- Vladimir Ilyukhin (born 1961), Russian politician
- Yekaterina Ilyukhina (born 1987), Russian snowboarder
- Yelena Ilyukhina (born 1982), Kazakhstani handball player
