= Judo at the 2006 Asian Games – Women's 78 kg =

Judo competition

Women's 78 kg at the 2006 Asian Games
- Venue: Qatar SC Indoor Hall
- Date: 2 December 2006
- Competitors: 9 from 9 nations

Medalists
gold medal	Sae Nakazawa	Japan
silver medal	Lee So-yeon	South Korea
bronze medal	Yang Xiuli	China
bronze medal	Pürevjargalyn Lkhamdegd	Mongolia

The women's 78 kilograms (Half heavyweight) competition at the 2006 Asian Games in Doha was held on 2 December at the Qatar SC Indoor Hall.

== Schedule ==
All times are Arabia Standard Time (UTC+03:00)

Date	Time	Event
Saturday, 2 December 2006	14:00	Round of 16
Saturday, 2 December 2006	14:00	Quarterfinals
Saturday, 2 December 2006	14:00	Repechage −1R
Saturday, 2 December 2006	14:00	Repechage final
Saturday, 2 December 2006	14:00	Semifinals
Saturday, 2 December 2006	14:00	Finals

== Results ==
=== Main bracket ===
Round of 16
Lee So-yeon (KOR)	1100
Patcharee Pichaipat (THA)	0000

Quarterfinals
Lee So-yeon (KOR)	1021
Zhanar Zhanzunova (KAZ)	0000
Pürevjargalyn Lkhamdegd (MGL)	1000
Kim Ryon-mi (PRK)	0000
Yang Xiuli (CHN)	0220
Alena Kozlova (KGZ)	0000
Elena Mogilinay (UZB)	0000
Sae Nakazawa (JPN)	1010

Semifinals
Lee So-yeon (KOR)	1001
Pürevjargalyn Lkhamdegd (MGL)	0000
Yang Xiuli (CHN)	0000
Sae Nakazawa (JPN)	1000

Gold medal contest
Lee So-yeon (KOR)	0000
Sae Nakazawa (JPN)	1000

=== Repechage ===
Repechage −1R
Patcharee Pichaipat (THA)	0000
Zhanar Zhanzunova (KAZ)	1001

Repechage final
Zhanar Zhanzunova (KAZ)	1000
Kim Ryon-mi (PRK)	0000
Alena Kozlova (KGZ)	0011
Elena Mogilinay (UZB)	0000

Bronze medal contest
Zhanar Zhanzunova (KAZ)	0000
Yang Xiuli (CHN)	1001
Alena Kozlova (KGZ)	0000
Pürevjargalyn Lkhamdegd (MGL)	1100
