= Wrestling at the 2008 Summer Olympics – Men's freestyle 66 kg =

Men's freestyle 66 kg at the Games of the XXIX Olympiad
- Venue: China Agricultural University Gymnasium
- Date: 20 August 2008
- Competitors: 21 from 21 nations

Medalists
1st place, gold medalist(s)		Ramazan Şahin	Turkey
2nd place, silver medalist(s)		Andriy Stadnik	Ukraine
3rd place, bronze medalist(s)		Otar Tushishvili	Georgia
3rd place, bronze medalist(s)		Sushil Kumar	India

Men's freestyle 66 kilograms competition at the 2008 Summer Olympics in Beijing, China, was held on August 20 at the China Agricultural University Gymnasium.

This freestyle wrestling competition consisted of a single-elimination tournament, with a repechage used to determine the winner of two bronze medals. The two finalists faced off for gold and silver medals. Each wrestler who lost to one of the two finalists moved into the repechage, culminating in a pair of bronze medal matches featuring the semifinal losers each facing the remaining repechage opponent from their half of the bracket.

Each bout consisted of up to three rounds, lasting two minutes apiece. The wrestler who scored more points in each round was the winner of that round; the bout finished when one wrestler had won two rounds (and thus the match).

== Schedule ==
All times are China Standard Time (UTC+08:00)

Date	Time	Event
20 August 2008	09:30	Qualification rounds
20 August 2008	16:00	Repechage
20 August 2008	17:00	Finals

== Results ==
Legend

- F — Won by fall

=== Final ===
Final
Ramazan Şahin (TUR)	2	2	2
Andriy Stadnik (UKR)	2	1	2

=== Top half ===
Qualifications

1/8 finals
Ramazan Şahin (TUR)	1	7
Geandry Garzón (CUB)	0	4
Mehdi Taghavi (IRI)	0	1	2
Haislan Garcia (CAN)	1	1	0
Kazuhiko Ikematsu (JPN)	1	3	0
Otar Tushishvili (GEO)	4	0	1
Jung Young-ho (KOR)	0	2	0
Serafim Barzakov (BUL)	1	1	2

Quarterfinals
Ramazan Şahin (TUR)	3	1
Mehdi Taghavi (IRI)	0	0
Otar Tushishvili (GEO)	3	2
Serafim Barzakov (BUL)	0	0

Semifinals
Ramazan Şahin (TUR)	1	3
Otar Tushishvili (GEO)	0	1

=== Bottom half ===
Qualifications
Andriy Stadnik (UKR)	2	4
Doug Schwab (USA)	0	0
Heinrich Barnes (RSA)	1	1
Buyanjavyn Batzorig (MGL)	2	7
Irbek Farniev (RUS)	2	5
Suren Markosyan (ARM)	1	1
Leonid Spiridonov (KAZ)	1	4	2
Wang Qiang (CHN)	1	0	0
Emin Azizov (AZE)	1	2
Grégory Sarrasin (SUI)	0	0

1/8 finals
Albert Batyrov (BLR)	1	5
Yang Chun-song (PRK)	0	3
Sushil Kumar (IND)	1	0
Andriy Stadnik (UKR)	2	6
Buyanjavyn Batzorig (MGL)	1	0	2
Irbek Farniev (RUS)	0	2	3
Leonid Spiridonov (KAZ)	2	1
Emin Azizov (AZE)	0	0

Quarterfinals
Albert Batyrov (BLR)	4	2	0
Andriy Stadnik (UKR)	1	4	3^{F}
Irbek Farniev (RUS)	3	0	0
Leonid Spiridonov (KAZ)	0	1	1

Semifinals
Andriy Stadnik (UKR)	1	2
Leonid Spiridonov (KAZ)	0	0

=== Repechage ===
Repechage round 1
Doug Schwab (USA)	1	1	2
Sushil Kumar (IND)	4	0	3

Repechage round 2
Geandry Garzón (CUB)	1	2	2
Mehdi Taghavi (IRI)	4	0	0
Sushil Kumar (IND)	1	0	7
Albert Batyrov (BLR)	0	4	0

Bronze medals
Geandry Garzón (CUB)	0	1
Otar Tushishvili (GEO)	3	1
Sushil Kumar (IND)	2	0	1
Leonid Spiridonov (KAZ)	1	1	0

== Final standing ==
Rank	Athlete
1st place, gold medalist(s)	Ramazan Şahin (TUR)
2nd place, silver medalist(s)	Andriy Stadnik (UKR)
3rd place, bronze medalist(s)	Otar Tushishvili (GEO)
3rd place, bronze medalist(s)	Sushil Kumar (IND)
5	Geandry Garzón (CUB)
5	Leonid Spiridonov (KAZ)
7	Irbek Farniev (RUS)
8	Buyanjavyn Batzorig (MGL)
9	Albert Batyrov (BLR)
10	Mehdi Taghavi (IRI)
11	Serafim Barzakov (BUL)
12	Emin Azizov (AZE)
13	Kazuhiko Ikematsu (JPN)
14	Doug Schwab (USA)
15	Yang Chun-song (PRK)
16	Haislan Garcia (CAN)
17	Jung Young-ho (KOR)
18	Suren Markosyan (ARM)
19	Heinrich Barnes (RSA)
20	Wang Qiang (CHN)
21	Grégory Sarrasin (SUI)
