= Wrestling at the 2010 Commonwealth Games – Men's freestyle 66 kg =

Specific Weight Wrestling Event

Men's freestyle 66 kg competition at the 2010 Commonwealth Games in New Delhi, India, was held on 10 October at the Indira Gandhi Arena.

== Medalists ==
Gold	Sushil Kumar; India
Silver	Heinrich Barnes; South Africa
Bronze	Chris Prickett; Canada

=== Bracket ===
Preliminary
Roshan Liyanage (SRI)	0	0	0
Muhammad Salmen (PAK)	6	3	0
Sushil Kumar (IND)	6	0	0
Mehrdad Tarash (AUS)	0	0	0
Phillip Roberts (ENG)	6	5	0
Jacob Munene (KEN)	0	0	0
Romeo Joseph (NGR)	0	1	3
Andrei Paulet (NZL)	1	0	0
Abdulai Rogers (SLE)	0	0	0
Chris Prickett (CAN)	7	0	0
Heinrich Barnes (RSA)	4	0	0
Gilbert Emilie (MRI)	0	0	0

Quarterfinals
Farmara Jarjou (GAM)	7	6	0
Iki Ekeroma (SAM)	0	0	0
Muhammad Salmen (PAK)	0	0	0
Sushil Kumar (IND)	7	3	0
Phillip Roberts (ENG)	1	1	0
Romeo Joseph (NGR)	0	0	0
Chris Prickett (CAN)	0	1	0
Heinrich Barnes (RSA)	6	2	0

Semifinals
Farmara Jarjou (GAM)	0	0	0
Sushil Kumar (IND)	3	0	0
Phillip Roberts (ENG)	0	0	0
Heinrich Barnes (RSA)	4	7	0

Final
Sushil Kumar (IND)	2	5	0
Heinrich Barnes (RSA)	0	0	0

=== Repechage ===
Repechage round 1
Mehrdad Tarash (AUS)	0	1
Muhammad Salmen (PAK)	1	3
Gilbert Emilie (MRI)	0	0
Chris Prickett (CAN)	7	6

Repechage round 2
Muhammad Salmen (PAK)	5	0
Farmara Jarjou (GAM)	0	0
Chris Prickett (CAN)	2	1
Phillip Roberts (ENG)	0	0

Bronze medals
Muhammad Salmen (PAK)	0	4	0
Chris Prickett (CAN)	1	0	7
Muhammad Salmen (PAK)	0	4	0
Chris Prickett (CAN)	1	0	7
