= Sae Nakazawa =

Japanese judoka (born 1983)

Personal information
- Born: 1 June 1983 (age 43)
- Occupation: Judoka

Sport
- Country: Japan
- Sport: Judo
- Weight class: –78 kg

Achievements and titles
- Olympic Games: R16 (2008)
- World Champ.: (silver) (2005, 2007)
- Asian Champ.: (gold) (2004, 2005, 2006)
Medal record
Women's judo
Representing Japan
World Championships
| Silver medal – second place | 2005 Cairo | –78 kg |
| Silver medal – second place | 2007 Rio de Janeiro | –78 kg |
Asian Games
| Gold medal – first place | 2006 Doha | –78 kg |
Asian Championships
| Gold medal – first place | 2004 Almaty | –78 kg |
| Gold medal – first place | 2005 Tashkent | –78 kg |
IJF Grand Prix
| Silver medal – second place | 2009 Hamburg | –78 kg |

Profile at external databases
- IJF: 76
- JudoInside.com: 21204
- Updated on 19 November 2022

Sae Nakazawa (中澤 さえ, Nakazawa Sae; born 1 June 1983 in Chofu, Tokyo) is a Japanese judoka.
