= Sagat Abikeyeva =

Kazakhstani judoka (born 1981)

Personal information
- Nationality: Kazakhstan
- Born: 14 May 1981 (age 45) Karaganda Region, Kazakh SSR, Soviet Union
- Height: 1.60 m (5 ft 3 in)
- Weight: 78 kg (172 lb)

Sport
- Sport: Judo
- Event: 78 kg
Medal record
Women's judo
Representing Kazakhstan
Asian Championships
Silver medal – second place	2005 Tashkent	Open
Bronze medal – third place	2004 Almaty	70 kg
Bronze medal – third place	2007 Kuwait City	78 kg

Sagat Abikeyeva (Kazakh: Сағат Ибрахимқызы Әбікеева (Әбдірахманова) (Sağat Äbıkeeva), Russian: Сагат Абикеева; born May 14, 1981, in Karaganda Region) is a Kazakhstani judoka, who played for the half-heavyweight category. She is also a three-time medalist for her division at the Asian Judo Championships (2004 in Almaty, 2005 in Tashkent, Uzbekistan, and 2007 in Kuwait City, Kuwait).

Abikeyeva represented Kazakhstan at the 2008 Summer Olympics in Beijing, where she competed for the women's half-heavyweight class (78 kg). She lost the first preliminary round match, with an ippon and a yoko shiho gatame (side four quarter hold), to Cuba's Yalennis Castillo. Because her opponent advanced further into the final, Abikeyeva offered another shot for the bronze medal by defeating India's Divya Tewar, with an ippon and an outside contest area technique (P16), in the first repechage bout. Unfortunately, she finished only in ninth place, after losing out the second repechage bout to France's Stéphanie Possamaï, who successfully scored an ippon and a juji gatame (back lying perpendicular armbar), at four minutes and twenty-two seconds.
