= R K Global =

Indian Financial Services company

- Type: Private
- Industry: Financial services
- Founded: New Delhi, India, 1995
- Founder: Ramesh Kumar Bhagchandka
- Headquarters: Mittal Chambers, Nariman Point, Mumbai
- Key people: Ramesh Kumar Bhagchandka (Chairman & MD)
- Services: Depository Participant, Equity Trading, Derivatives Trading, Currency Trading, NRI/PIS Services, Distribution of Mutual Funds, IPO
- Website: www.rkglobal.net

R K GLOBAL is an Indian financial broking firm with services ranging from Equities, Derivatives, Commodities, Currency, Depository, IPO Distribution, Mutual Fund Distribution and Consultancy.

== Background ==
The company was founded in 1995 in New Delhi by Ramesh Kumar Bhagchandka. In 2000, the company set up its retail broking business. R K Global became a Depository Participant of NSDL in 2001. Since then, it has obtained membership of (NSE, BSE, MCX, NCDEX, MCX'SX, NSEL, NSDL) under different group companies. The company launched online trading in 2006. In the same year, Amit Kumar Bhagchandka, joined the board as the Group CEO. As of 2011, the company offers its services in over 150 cities and 24 States across India with a strong base of business associates and a client base of over 90,000 customers.

In 2011, R K Global announced cricketer and youth icon Suresh Raina as the brand ambassador of the company. Gautam Gambhir was signed in 2012 as the new Brand Ambassador alongside youngster and ICC U-19 World Cup Winning Captain Unmukt Chand.

== Group Companies ==
1. R K Global Shares & Securities Ltd (Member: NSE, BSE, NSDL & MCX-SX)
2. R K Global Commodity Broking Ltd (Member: NCDEX, MCX & NSEL)
3. R K Global Equity Broking Ltd (Member: BSE)
4. R K Global Insurance Brokers Ltd (Advisory on Life & General Insurance)
5. R K Global Finance Pvt. Ltd (A Govt. Of India recognised NBFC)
6. R K Global IMPEX Ltd; (Franchise of Kraken Opus)
7. R K Global Infrastructure Ltd

== Recognitions ==
- R K Global acquired M S Dhoni’s 2011 World Cup Winning Bat for Rs.72 lakhs (GBP 100,000) with proceeds going to M S Dhoni's Charitable Foundation, a trust that works for underprivileged children. For this R K Global became the official recipient of Guinness Book of World Records title for "The Most Expensive Cricket Bat" in the world.
- R K Global etched its name in Limca Book of Records for "The Costliest Cricket Bat" in the world for the year 2012.
