= Wrestling at the 2006 Asian Games – Men's freestyle 66 kg =

Men's freestyle 66 kg at the 2006 Asian Games
- Venue: Aspire Hall 4
- Date: 14 December 2006
- Competitors: 16 from 16 nations

Medalists
| gold medal | Baek Jin-kuk | South Korea |
| silver medal | Takafumi Kojima | Japan |
| bronze medal | Buyanjavyn Batzorig | Mongolia |
| bronze medal | Sushil Kumar | India |

The men's freestyle 66 kg wrestling competition at the 2006 Asian Games in Doha was held on 14 December 2006 at the Aspire Hall 4.

This freestyle wrestling competition consisted of a single-elimination tournament, with a repechage used to determine the winner of two bronze medals. The two finalists faced off for gold and silver medals. Each wrestler who lost to one of the two finalists moved into the repechage, culminating in a pair of bronze medal matches featuring the semifinal losers each facing the remaining repechage opponent from their half of the bracket.

Each bout consisted of up to three rounds, lasting two minutes apiece. The wrestler who scored more points in each round was the winner of that rounds; the bout finished when one wrestler had won two rounds (and thus the match).

== Schedule ==
All times are Arabia Standard Time (UTC+03:00)

| Date | Time | Event |
|---|---|---|
| Thursday, 14 December 2006 | 09:00 | Preliminary |
| Thursday, 14 December 2006 | 09:00 | Quarterfinals |
| Thursday, 14 December 2006 | 09:00 | Semifinals |
| Thursday, 14 December 2006 | 09:00 | Repechages |
| Thursday, 14 December 2006 | 18:00 | Finals |

== Results ==
Legend

- F — Won by fall

=== Main bracket ===
Preliminary
Chab Loeun (CAM) | 0 | 0
Masoud Mostafa-Jokar (IRI) | 3 | 5
Ghulam Haider (PAK) | 0 | 0
Buyanjavyn Batzorig (MGL) | 7 | 4
Baek Jin-kuk (KOR) | 1 | 4
Li Quan (CHN) | 0 | 0
Jimmy Angana (PHI) | 2 | 2
Mazen Kadmani (SYR) | 3 | 7
Takafumi Kojima (JPN) | 1 | 3
Noruzbek Belekov (KGZ) | 0 | 1
Leonid Spiridonov (KAZ) | 1 | 4
Ma Won-chol (PRK) | 0 | 1
Arslan Khutaliev (UZB) | 3 | 5
Najibullah Noori (AFG) | 0 | 0
Sushil Kumar (IND) | 5 | 6
Mohamed Al-Qubaisi (UAE) | 0 | 0

Quarterfinals
Masoud Mostafa-Jokar (IRI) | 3 | 1 | 4
Buyanjavyn Batzorig (MGL) | 1 | 2 | 4
Baek Jin-kuk (KOR) | 4 | 1
Mazen Kadmani (SYR) | 0 | 0
Takafumi Kojima (JPN) | 0 | 3 | 5
Leonid Spiridonov (KAZ) | 2 | 2 | 3
Arslan Khutaliev (UZB) | 3 | 1 | 1
Sushil Kumar (IND) | 3 | 2 | 2

Semifinals
Buyanjavyn Batzorig (MGL) | 0 | 0
Baek Jin-kuk (KOR) | 1 | 7
Takafumi Kojima (JPN) | 0 | 2 | 3^{F}
Sushil Kumar (IND) | 2 | 0 | 4

Gold medal match
Baek Jin-kuk (KOR) | 1 | 2
Takafumi Kojima (JPN) | 0 | 0

=== Repechage ===
Repechage
Li Quan (CHN) | 1 | 6
Mazen Kadmani (SYR) | 1 | 0
Noruzbek Belekov (KGZ) | 0 | 0
Leonid Spiridonov (KAZ) | 1 | 1

Bronze medal match
Li Quan (CHN) | 2 | 0
Buyanjavyn Batzorig (MGL) | 2 | 1
Leonid Spiridonov (KAZ) | 0 | 1
Sushil Kumar (IND) | 1 | 3

== Final standing ==
| Rank | Athlete |
|---|---|
| 1st place, gold medalist(s) | Baek Jin-kuk (KOR) |
| 2nd place, silver medalist(s) | Takafumi Kojima (JPN) |
| 3rd place, bronze medalist(s) | Buyanjavyn Batzorig (MGL) |
| 3rd place, bronze medalist(s) | Sushil Kumar (IND) |
| 5 | Li Quan (CHN) |
| 5 | Leonid Spiridonov (KAZ) |
| 7 | Masoud Mostafa-Jokar (IRI) |
| 8 | Arslan Khutaliev (UZB) |
| 9 | Mazen Kadmani (SYR) |
| 10 | Jimmy Angana (PHI) |
| 11 | Ma Won-chol (PRK) |
| 12 | Noruzbek Belekov (KGZ) |
| 13 | Chab Loeun (CAM) |
| 13 | Najibullah Noori (AFG) |
| 15 | Mohamed Al-Qubaisi (UAE) |
| 15 | Ghulam Haider (PAK) |
