= Albert Batyrov =

Belarusian freestyle wrestler

Albert Batyrov (born November 2, 1981, in Vladikavkaz) is a male freestyle wrestler from Belarus. He participated in Men's freestyle 66 kg at 2008 Summer Olympics. In the 1/8 of final he beat North Korean Yang Chun-Song then in 1/4 of final he lost with Ukrainian Andriy Stadnik. In repechage round he lost with Sushil Kumar from India and was eliminated.
