= Marylise Lévesque =

Canadian judoka (born 1983)

Personal information
- Born: 3 March 1983 (age 43)
- Occupation: Judoka

Sport
- Sport: Judo
Medal record
Women's Judo
Representing Canada
Pan American Games
Bronze medal – third place	2007 Rio de Janeiro	Half-Heavyweight

Profile at external databases
- IJF: 1755
- JudoInside.com: 25473

Marylise Lévesque (born March 3, 1983, in Quebec, Canada) is a Canadian judoka. She competed at the 2008 Summer Olympics in the 78kg category and lost to Pürevjargalyn Lkhamdegd in the repechage. Lévesque won the bronze at the 2007 Pan American Games.

== See also ==
- Judo in Quebec
- Judo in Canada
- List of Canadian judoka
