= Baprola =

Coordinates: 28.6407792°N 77.010416987°E

- Village
- Interactive map of Baprola
- Country: India

Area
  - Total: 9.82 km^{2} (3.79 sq mi)

Population (2020)
  - Total: 67,555

Languages
  - Official: Hindi, English
- Time zone: UTC+5:30 (IST)

Baprola (or Bapraula) is a census town and village on the outskirts of Najafgarh in the National Capital Territory of Delhi. It lies near the Delhi-Haryana border and is one of 12 villages of Solanki clan in Delhi. The Jat-dominated village is situated in the South West Delhi district. It is located in Najafgarh Zone (MCD). It is best known as the home of the double Olympic medalist wrestler Sushil Kumar. Apart from this, Baprola is known as the home of the district president of BJP- Vijay Solanki: whose father Late. Ch. Kaptan Singh was the sarpanch in the last panchayat of the village. Haryanvi is the most spoken language in the village along with Hindi.
