= Buyanjavyn Batzorig =

Mongolian wrestler (born 1983)

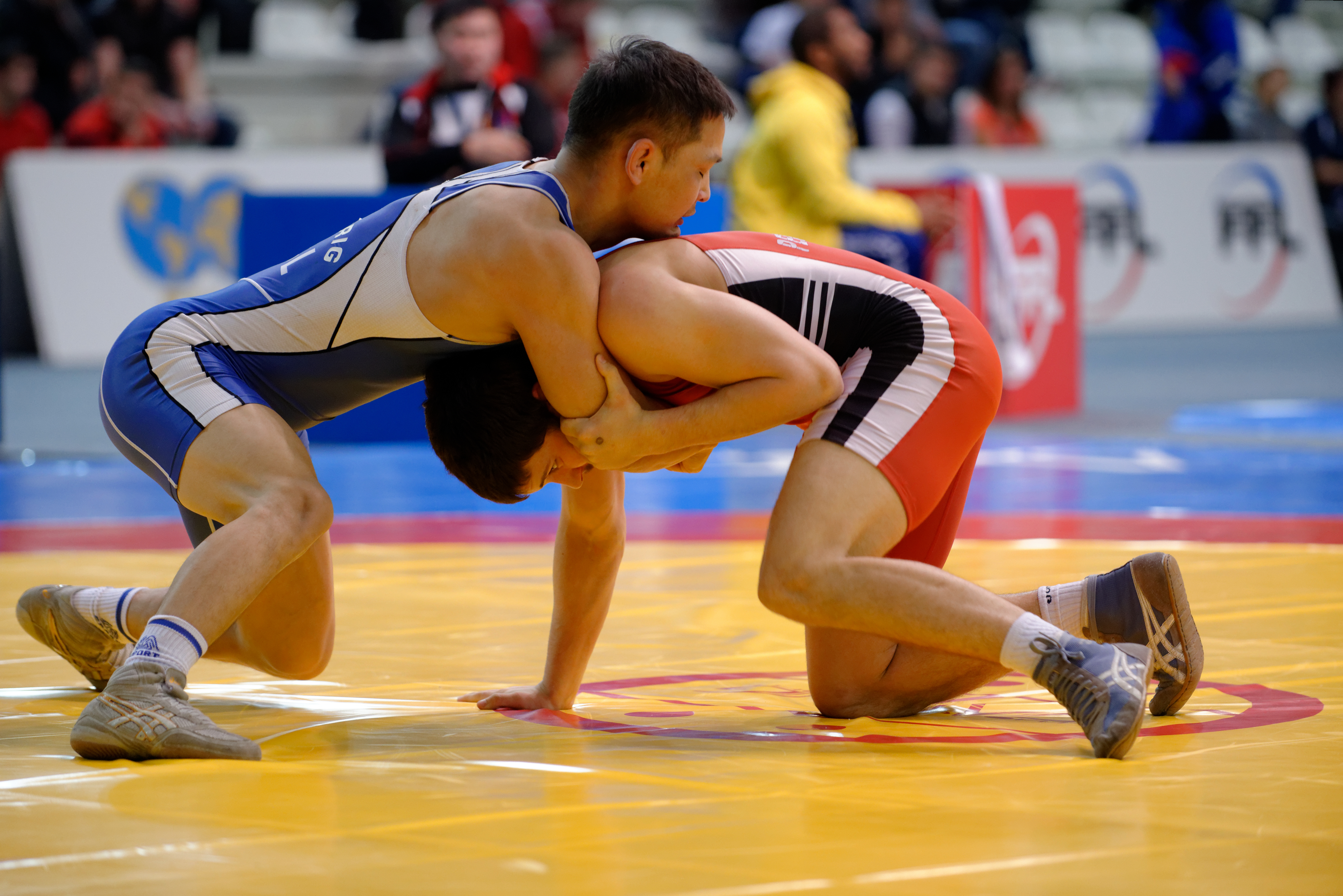

Personal information
- Native name: Буяанжав Батзориг
- Nationality: Mongolia
- Born: 9 March 1983 (age 43) Selenge, Mongolia
- Height: 170 cm (5 ft 7 in)

Sport
- Country: Mongolia
- Sport: Wrestling
- Weight class: 66 kg
- Event: Freestyle
- Coached by: Dugarsürengiin Oyuunbold

Achievements and titles
- Olympic finals: 8th (2008)
- World finals: 7th (2005) 8th (2007) 5th (2010)
Medal record
Men's Freestyle wrestling
Representing Mongolia
Asian Games
Bronze medal – third place	2006 Doha	66 kg
Asian Championships
Silver medal – second place	2006 Almaty	66 kg
Bronze medal – third place	2004 Tehran	66 kg
Bronze medal – third place	2016 Bangkok	70 kg
World University Championships
Gold medal – first place	2006 Ulaanbaatar	66 kg
Men's beach wrestling
Asian Beach Games
Bronze medal – third place	2016 Da Nang	70 kg

Buyanjav Batzorig (born 9 March 1983) is a former Olympian freestyle wrestler and a Mongolian national wrestling team coach. Since January 2017, he has been working as coach. As a wrestler he participated in Men's freestyle 66 kg at 2008 Summer Olympics. In the 1/16 of final he beat Heinrich Barnes, but in the 1/8 of final he was eliminated by Irbek Farniev from Russia.

Batzorig won a gold medal during the 2006 Asian Games. Also, Batzorig won a gold medal during the 2006 World University Championships.
