= Russian National Freestyle 2017 – Men's freestyle 65 kg =

The men's freestyle 65 kg is a competition featured at the 2017 Russian National Freestyle Wrestling Championships, and was held in Nazran, Ingushetia, Russia on June 14.

== Medalists ==
Gold	(North Ossetia–Alania) Alan Gogaev
Silver	(Dagestan) Murshid Mutalimov
Bronze	(Krasnoyarsk Krai) Nachyn Kuular
Bronze	(Chechnya) Imam Adzhiev

== Results ==
Legend

- F — Won by fall
- WO — Won by walkover (bye)

=== Finals ===
Final
(North Ossetia–Alania) Alan Gogaev	4
(Dagestan) Murshid Mutalimov	3

Semifinals: Murshid Mutalimov def. Rustam Gaimasov by tech. superiority (12–1)

=== Top half ===
==== Section 1 ====
Round of 32
(Dagestan) Arsen Gusbanov	11
(Yakutia) Larion Andreev	0
(Buryatia) Aleksey Borovitskiy	6
(North Ossetia–Alania) Alan Gogaev	10
(Leningrad Oblast) Marat Dedetkaev	8
(Republic of Crimea (Russia)) Elbrus Bolotaev	6
(Dagestan) Tagib Gasanov	1
(Dagestan) Abdul-Gadzhi Mgomedov	11
(Buryatia) Bulat Batoev	11
(Tuva) Mengi Mortiy-ool	2
(Chechnya) Imam Adzhiev	14
(Yakutia) Aleksey Ivanov	4
(Chechnya) Bakar Aubov	1
(Moscow Oblast) Rustam Murtazaliev	1
(Khanty-Mansi Autonomous Okrug) Islam Masagadzhiev	0
(Moscow Oblast) Ratmir Kerefov	10

Round of 16
(Dagestan) Arsen Gusbanov	0
(North Ossetia–Alania) Alan Gogaev	10
(Leningrad Oblast) Marat Dedetkaev	6
(Dagestan) Abdul-Gadzhi Mgomedov	7
(Buryatia) Bulat Batoev	1
(Chechnya) Imam Adzhiev	3
(Chechnya) Bakar Aubov	1
(Moscow Oblast) Ratmir Kerefov	6

Quarterfinals
(North Ossetia–Alania) Alan Gogaev	3
(Dagestan) Abdul-Gadzhi Mgomedov	1
(Chechnya) Imam Adzhiev	5
(Moscow Oblast) Ratmir Kerefov	0

Semifinals
(North Ossetia–Alania) Alan Gogaev	3
(Chechnya) Imam Adzhiev	1

=== Section 2 ===
Round of 64
(Khakassia) Semen Tershenko	2
(Yakutia) Konstantin Vlasov	1

Round of 32
(Chechnya) Dzhamal Otarsultanov	7
(North Ossetia–Alania) Chermen Valiev	10
(Chuvashia) Ivan Filippov	0
(Krasnoyarsk Krai) Nachyn Kuular	7
(Dagestan) Murshid Mutalimov	6
(Dagestan) Khairula Narudinov	3
(Kabardino-Balkaria) Astemir Kuantanov	0
(Khakassia) Semen Tershenko	11

Round of 16
(North Ossetia–Alania) Chermen Valiev	2
(Krasnoyarsk Krai) Nachyn Kuular	10
(Dagestan) Murshid Mutalimov	16
(Khakassia) Semen Tershenko	4

Quarterfinals
(Krasnoyarsk Krai) Nachyn Kuular	3
(Dagestan) Murshid Mutalimov	6

==== Section 3 ====
Round of 64
(Bryansk Oblast) Serafim Yakovlev	0
(Krasnoyarsk Krai) Murad Nukhkadiev	10
(North Ossetia–Alania) Gamlet Ramonov	6
(North Ossetia–Alania) Taymuraz Guriyev	0
(Ingushetia) Adam Akiev	4
(Moscow Oblast) Magomedkhabib Saidov	8
(Moscow Oblast) Abdullah Medzhidov	0
(Krasnoyarsk Krai) Savr Shalburov	10
(Dagestan) Shamil Radzhabov	4
(Leningrad Oblast) Magomed Magomedov	6
(North Ossetia–Alania) Uruzbek Tsomaratov	5
(North Ossetia–Alania) Azamat Kabisov	8
(Dagestan) Rustam Gaimasov	17
(Moscow Oblast) Ramazan Ramazanov	4
(Tuva) Chudak Mengi	3
(Chechnya) Salakh Timaev	1

Round of 32
(Krasnoyarsk Krai) Murad Nukhkadiev	4
(North Ossetia–Alania) Gamlet Ramonov	10
(Moscow Oblast) Magomedkhabib Saidov	0
(Krasnoyarsk Krai) Savr Shalburov	8^{F}
(Leningrad Oblast) Magomed Magomedov	12
(North Ossetia–Alania) Azamat Kabisov	2
(Dagestan) Rustam Gaimasov	8
(Tuva) Chudak Mengi	3

Round of 16
(North Ossetia–Alania) Gamlet Ramonov	6
(Krasnoyarsk Krai) Savr Shalburov	14
(Leningrad Oblast) Magomed Magomedov	6
(Dagestan) Rustam Gaimasov	8

Quarterfinals
(Krasnoyarsk Krai) Savr Shalburov	0
(Dagestan) Rustam Gaimasov	10

=== Repechage ===
Repechage round 1
(Buryatia) Aleksey Borovitskiy	5
(Dagestan) Arsen Gusbanov	11
(Dagestan) Khairula Narudinov	3
(Khakassia) Semen Tershenko	0

Repechage round 2
(Dagestan) Arsen Gusbanov	3
(Dagestan) Abdul-Gadzhi Mgomedov	4
(Dagestan) Khairula Narudinov	0
(Krasnoyarsk Krai) Nachyn Kuular	10

Bronze medals
(Dagestan) Abdul-Gadzhi Mgomedov	2
(Chechnya) Imam Adzhiev	7
(Krasnoyarsk Krai) Nachyn Kuular	6
(Dagestan) Rustam Gaimasov	1
