= Therese Bengtsson =

Swedish handball goalkeeper (born 1979)

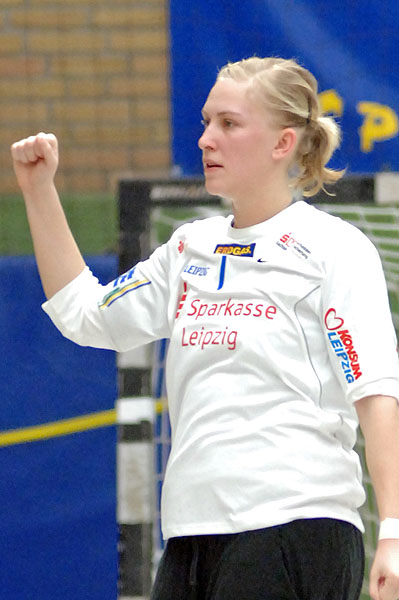
- Therese Bengtsson in 2008

Personal information
- Nationality: Swedish
- Born: 13 February 1979 (age 47) Eslöv, Sweden
- Height: 187 cm (74 in)

Sport
- Sport: Handball
- Position: Goalkeeper
- Current club: Retired

Senior clubs
- Years: Team
- -1998 1998-2000 2000-2001 2001-2005 2005-2007 2007-2008 2008-2012: Eslövs IK; Skånela IF; Stockholmspolisens IF; Eslövs IK; IL Björnar; HC Leipzig; Eslövs IK
National team
| Years | Team | Apps | (Gls) |
| 2001-2008 | Sweden | 33 | (0) |

Therese Bengtsson (born 13 February 1979) is a Swedish former handball goalkeeper. She played for the Swedish national team.

== Career ==
Bengtsson started playing professional handball at the club Eslövs IK She also played for Skånela IF and Stockholmspolisens IF and IL Björnar in Norway, before moving to HC Leipzig in Germany. While playing for Stockholmspolisens IF she was called up to the national team for the first time. While playing for Eslöv she won the Swedish Cup in 2002, 2003 and 2007. In Germany she won the 2008 the DHB-Pokal with Leipzig.

In 2008 she return to her mother club, Eslövs IK from HC Leipzig, where she played for one additional season before retirering. She later made a comeback at the same club in the 2016–17 season, 7 years after she had retired.

With the Swedish national team she played in the European Women's Handball Championship in 2006 at home, and got 6th place. This also qualified them for the 2008 Olympics.

She participated at the 2008 Summer Olympics in China, where the Swedish team placed eight.
