= Kraken Opus =

- Status: Active
- Founded: 2005
- Founder: Karl Fowler
- Country of origin: Guernsey
- Headquarters location: United Arab Emirates
- Distribution: Opus Media Group PLC
- Key people: Karl Fowler, Paul Murphy
- Publication types: Books
- Nonfiction topics: Sports teams; celebrities; arts; culture
- Fiction genres: Definitive publications
- Official website: https://www.thisisopus.com

Kraken Opus is a publishing company operating from Guernsey in the Channel Islands; London, United Kingdom; and the United Arab Emirates. The company produces premium, outsized editions on subjects including sports teams and celebrities, and on broader topics including the Muslim hajj. The company describes its publications, which are produced in limited editions retailing for up to £1m, as "works of art".

== Company history ==
The company is owned by Karl Fowler, a former Goldman Sachs investment banker. He founded Kraken Opus following a period managing his own financial services company, for which he built up a client list including several sports stars. The interests of these clients inspired him to consider a high-end publication for sports fans; he invested $5 million of his own money and of capital put up by friends and acquaintances to found Kraken Opus. Its first title was the Manchester United Opus, published in 2006: the book weighed 97 pounds (44 kg) and each edition in its 10,000 run was priced between £3000 and £4500.

In December 2008 the company opened a proprietary shop in Covent Garden. The company entered voluntary administration in June 2009 when a US backer announced that a tranche of $6m in promised funding would not be forthcoming. Days later, following an offer to existing shareholders, Fowler and partner Paul Murphy undertook a management buyout of the company, announcing that a new Arab funder had been found and that the company's headquarters would be moved from London to the United Arab Emirates. At the time the company faced criticism over the delayed publication of the £3000-per-copy Celtic Opus, which was postponed from July 2009, after pre-orders and deposits had been received. The print run was also reduced, but the firm insisted that publication would still go ahead.

== Publications ==
Several of the company's publications have attracted press notice, including the Burj Dubai Opus, a 15-foot (4.6 m) tall edition of which was commissioned to stand in the lobby of the building on its opening. A copy of the Manchester United Opus, auctioned for $1.5m to a Middle Eastern consortium with proceeds given to the Dubai Cares charity, was the most expensive sports book ever sold. Wine Opus had a print run of only one hundred copies, each priced at AU£1.2m each. The Prince Opus was sold, in tandem with a branded iPhone model, for US$2,100, while as of June 2009 one hundred copies of the Diego Maradona Opus were due to ship with samples of Maradona's blood and hair. Kraken Opus, in partnership with ticket vendor Ticketmaster, also produced the £109 Michael Jackson Opus, the only book licensed by the Jackson estate in the immediate aftermath of his death. Vivienne Westwood Opus, published in 2008, was a limited edition of 900 priced at £1,400. Sachin Tendulkar Opus was the most expensive cricket book published. In December 2017 the company offered a special 'diamante' edition of their The Official Ferrari Opus, also published in 2011 in various editions for between $4,100 and $37,500, for auction through Sotheby's at an estimate of $150,000.

== Bibliography ==
- Sachin Tendulkar
- Ferrari
- Vivienne Westwood
- Bradley Wiggins
- Formula 1
- Arsenal
- Prince
- Michael Jackson
- Burj Khalifa
