= Emin Azizov =

Azerbaijani wrestler (born 1984)

Medal record

Representing Azerbaijan

Men's Freestyle Wrestling

European Wrestling Championships
Bronze medal – third place	2008	66 kg

Emin Azizov (born December 29, 1984) is a male freestyle wrestler from Azerbaijan. He participated in the Men's freestyle 66 kg at the 2008 Summer Olympics. In the 1/16 of final he beat Swiss Grégory Sarrasin, but lost in the next round against Leonid Spiridonov and was eliminated from the competition.

He won a bronze medal at the 2008 European Wrestling Championships.
