= Tatyana Parfenova =

Kazakhstani handball player

Personal information
- Nationality: Kazakhstani
- Born: 1 June 1985 (age 41) Kyzylorda, Kazakh SSR, Soviet Union
- Height: 183 cm (72 in)

Sport
- Sport: Handball

Senior clubs
- Years: Team
- –: Almaty
National team
- Years: Team
- –: Kazakhstan
Medal record
Asian Games
Bronze medal – third place	2014 Incheon

Tatyana Parfenova (Russian: Татьяна Парфёнова; born 1 June 1985 in Kyzylorda) is a handball player from Kazakhstan. She played on the Kazakhstan women's national handball team and participated at 2008 Summer Olympics in Beijing, the 2010 Asian Games, and the 2011 World Women's Handball Championship in Brazil.
