= Yang Xiuli =

Chinese judoka (born 1983)

Personal information
- Born: 1 September 1983 (age 42)
- Occupation: Judoka

Sport
- Country: China
- Sport: Judo
- Weight class: –78 kg

Achievements and titles
- Olympic Games: (gold) (2008)
- World Champ.: (bronze) (2010)
- Asian Champ.: (bronze) (2006, 2010)
Medal record
Women's judo
Representing China
Olympic Games
Gold medal – first place	2008 Beijing	‍–‍78 kg
World Championships
Bronze medal – third place	2010 Tokyo	‍–‍78 kg
Asian Games
Bronze medal – third place	2006 Doha	‍–‍78 kg
Bronze medal – third place	2010 Guangzhou	‍–‍78 kg
World Masters
Gold medal – first place	2011 Baku	‍–‍78 kg
Silver medal – second place	2012 Almaty	‍–‍78 kg
IJF Grand Slam
Gold medal – first place	2008 Tokyo	‍–‍78 kg
Gold medal – first place	2009 Moscow	‍–‍78 kg
Gold medal – first place	2010 Moscow	‍–‍78 kg
Bronze medal – third place	2009 Paris	‍–‍78 kg
Bronze medal – third place	2010 Tokyo	‍–‍78 kg
IJF Grand Prix
Gold medal – first place	2009 Qingdao	‍–‍78 kg
Gold medal – first place	2010 Qingdao	‍–‍78 kg
Silver medal – second place	2011 Qingdao	‍–‍78 kg
Silver medal – second place	2012 Düsseldorf	‍–‍78 kg
Bronze medal – third place	2011 Düsseldorf	‍–‍78 kg

Profile at external databases
- IJF: 2185
- JudoInside.com: 13426
- Updated on 30 May 2023

Yang Xiuli (simplified Chinese: 杨秀丽; traditional Chinese: 楊秀麗; pinyin: Yáng Xiùlì; born 1 September 1983 in Fuxin, Liaoning) is a Chinese judoka. She won a gold medal at the 2008 Olympics and a bronze medal at the 2006 Asian Games 78 kg category.
