= Alan Gogaev =

Russian wrestler (born 1990)

Personal information
- Full name: Alan Kazbekovich Gogaev
- Born: 8 March 1990 (age 36) Digora, North Ossetian ASSR, Russian SFSR, Soviet Union
- Height: 170 cm (5 ft 7 in)
- Weight: 66 kg (146 lb)

Sport
- Country: Russia
- Sport: Wrestling
- Weight class: 65 kg
- Event: Freestyle
Medal record
Men's freestyle wrestling
Representing Russia
World Championships
| Silver medal – second place | 2010 Moscow | 66 kg |
| Bronze medal – third place | 2017 Paris | 65 kg |
European Championships
| Gold medal – first place | 2012 Belgrade | 66 kg |
Russian National Championships
| Gold medal – first place | 2017 Nazran | 65 kg |
| Gold medal – first place | 2012 St.Petersburg | 66 kg |
| Gold medal – first place | 2010 Volgograd | 66 kg |
| Bronze medal – third place | 2020 Naro-Fominsk | 65 kg |
| Bronze medal – third place | 2016 Yakutsk | 65 kg |
Golden Grand Prix Ivan Yarygin
| Gold medal – first place | 2012 Krasnoyarsk | 66 kg |
| Bronze medal – third place | 2017 Krasnoyarsk | 65 kg |
Junior World Championships
| Gold medal – first place | 2010 Budapest | 66 kg |

Alan Kazbekovich Gogaev (Russian: Алан Казбекович Гогаев; born 8 March 1990) is a Russian freestyle wrestler. He was the runner up at the 2010 World Wrestling Championships in Moscow, Russia, won bronze at the 2017 World Championships in Paris and was European Champion in 2012 in Belgrade, Serbia. He competed in the 66 kg event at the 2012 Summer Olympics in London, where he was defeated in the first round by Zalimkhan Yusupov from Tajikistan.
