= Divya Tewar =

Indian judoka

- Occupation: Sportsperson (Judo)

Divya Tewar (born 1 August 1984 in Haryana) is an Indian judoka. She represented India at the 2008 Summer Olympics in Beijing in the 78 kg category, but failed to qualify for the finals.

She first lost to Cuba's Yalennis Castillo in the preliminary round, and was then beaten by Kazakhstan's Sagat Abikeyeva in the first repechage.

== See also ==
- India at the 2008 Summer Olympics
