= Wang Qiang (wrestler) =

Chinese freestyle wrestler (born 1987)

Wang Qiang (born April 14, 1987 in Hebei; Chinese: 王强; pinyin: Wáng Qiáng) is a male Chinese freestyle wrestler who competed at the 2008 Summer Olympics.

He placed #20 in the Welterweight, Freestyle(≤66 kilograms) in the 2008 Summer Olympics.
