= Pürevjargalyn Lkhamdegd =

Mongolian judoka (born 1986)

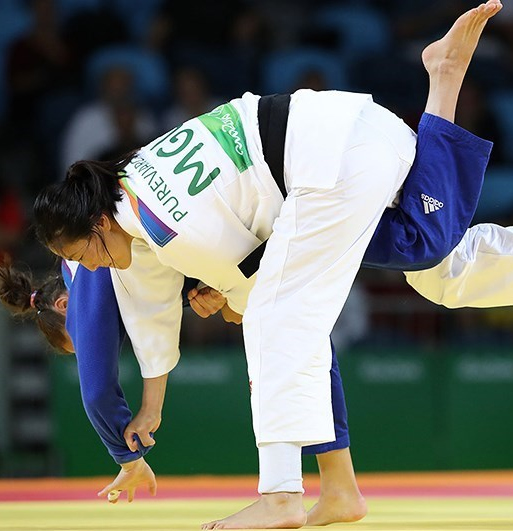
- Pürevjargalyn Lkhamdegd at the 2016 Olympics

Personal information
- Born: 18 September 1986 (age 39) Ulaanbaatar, Mongolia
- Occupation: Judoka
- Height: 1.80 m (5 ft 11 in)

Sport
- Country: Mongolia
- Sport: Judo
- Weight class: ‍–‍70 kg, ‍–‍78 kg
- Coached by: Baljinnyam Odvog (national)

Achievements and titles
- Olympic Games: 7th (2008)
- World Champ.: 7th (2010)
- Asian Champ.: (gold) (2011, 2012)
Medal record
Women's judo
Representing Mongolia
Asian Games
Bronze medal – third place	2006 Doha	‍–‍78 kg
Asian Championships
Gold medal – first place	2011 Abu Dhabi	‍–‍78 kg
Gold medal – first place	2012 Tashkent	‍–‍78 kg
Silver medal – second place	2007 Kuwait City	‍–‍78 kg
Bronze medal – third place	2008 Jeju	‍–‍78 kg
Bronze medal – third place	2009 Taipei	‍–‍70 kg
Bronze medal – third place	2016 Tashkent	‍–‍78 kg
IJF Grand Slam
Silver medal – second place	2012 Moscow	‍–‍78 kg
IJF Grand Prix
Gold medal – first place	2011 Düsseldorf	‍–‍78 kg
Gold medal – first place	2011 Amsterdam	‍–‍78 kg
Gold medal – first place	2016 Ulaanbaatar	‍–‍78 kg
Asian Junior Championships
Bronze medal – third place	2005 Beirut	‍–‍78 kg
Summer Universiade
Silver medal – second place	2009 Belgrade	‍–‍70 kg

Profile at external databases
- IJF: 201
- JudoInside.com: 37352
- Updated on 23 October 2022

Pürevjargalyn Lkhamdegd (Mongolian: Пүрэвжаргалын Лхамдэгд, born 18 September 1986) is a Mongolian retired judoka who competed in the 78 kg category. She won a bronze medal at the 2006 Asian Games and participated in the 2008, 2012 and 2016 Olympics, reaching the quarter-finals in 2008.
