= Yuliya Markovich =

Kazakhstani handball player

Personal information
- Nationality: Kazakhstani
- Born: 11 July 1989 (age 37) Kyzylorda, Kazakh SSR, Soviet Union

Sport
- Sport: Handball
National team
- Years: Team
- –: Kazakhstan

Yuliya Markovich (born 11 July 1989) is a Kazakhstani handball player. She was born in Kyzylorda and competed at the 2008 Summer Olympics in Beijing, where the Kazakhstani team placed 10th.
