= Stéphanie Possamaï =

Olympic judoka medalist from France

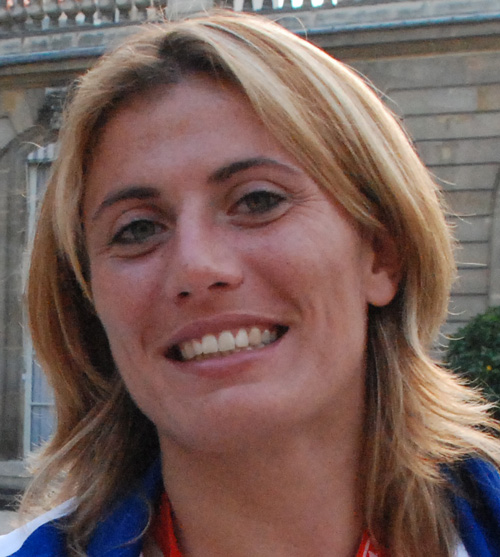
- Stéphanie Possamaï in 2008

Personal information
- Born: 30 July 1980 (age 45) Bordeaux, France
- Occupation: Judoka

Sport
- Country: France
- Sport: Judo
- Weight class: ‍–‍78 kg

Achievements and titles
- Olympic Games: (bronze) (2008)
- World Champ.: (bronze) (2007)
- European Champ.: (gold) (2007)
Medal record
Women's judo
Representing France
Olympic Games
Bronze medal – third place	2008 Beijing	‍–‍78 kg
World Championships
Bronze medal – third place	2007 Rio de Janeiro	‍–‍78 kg
European Championships
Gold medal – first place	2007 Belgrade	‍–‍78 kg
IJF Grand Slam
Silver medal – second place	2009 Moscow	‍–‍78 kg
Silver medal – second place	2009 Rio de Janeiro	‍–‍78 kg
IJF Grand Prix
Bronze medal – third place	2009 Hamburg	‍–‍78 kg
Bronze medal – third place	2010 Tunis	‍–‍78 kg
Summer Universiade
Bronze medal – third place	2003 Jeju	‍–‍78 kg

Profile at external databases
- IJF: 1899
- JudoInside.com: 9212
- Updated on 30 May 2023

Stéphanie Possamaï (born 30 July 1980, in Bordeaux) is a French judoka.

Possamaï won a bronze medal in the ‍–‍78 kg category at the 2008 Summer Olympics. She also participated in the 2012 Judo Grand Slam Paris, as well as multiple world cups.
