= Yekaterina Tyapkova =

Kazakhstani handball player

Personal information
- Nationality: Kazakhstani
- Born: 2 July 1984 (age 42) Kyzylorda, Kazakh SSR, Soviet Union

Sport
- Sport: Handball
National team
- Years: Team
- –: Kazakhstan

Yekaterina Tyapkova (Екатерина Александровна Тяпкова, born 2 July 1984) is a Kazakhstani handball player. She was born in Kyzylorda. She competed at the 2008 Summer Olympics in Beijing, where the Kazakhstani team placed 10th.
