= Kseniya Nikandrova =

Kazakhstani handball player

Personal information
- Nationality: Kazakhstani
- Born: 27 January 1987 (age 39) Kyzylorda, Kazakh SSR, Soviet Union
- Height: 181 cm (71 in)

Sport
- Sport: Handball
National team
- Years: Team
- –: Kazakhstan

Kseniya Nikandrova (born 27 January 1987) is a Kazakhstani handball player. She was born in Kyzylorda. She competed at the 2008 Summer Olympics in Beijing, where the Kazakhstani team placed 10th.
