= Zhanar Zhanzunova =

Kazakhstani judoka (born 1985)

Personal information
- Nationality: Kazakhstani
- Born: 16 July 1985 (age 40) Kyzylorda, Kazakh SSR, Soviet Union
- Height: 1.68 m (5 ft 6 in)
- Weight: 70 kg (154 lb)

Sport
- Sport: Judo
- Event: 70 kg
Medal record
Women's judo
Representing Kazakhstan
Asian Championships
Silver medal – second place	2007 Kuwait City	70 kg
Bronze medal – third place	2008 Jeju City	70 kg

Zhanar Zhanzunova (Kazakh: Жанар Мейрамбековна Жанзунова, Janar Janzunova; born July 16, 1985, in Kyzylorda) is a Kazakhstani judoka, who played for the middleweight category. She won a silver medal for her division at the 2007 Asian Judo Championships in Kuwait City, Kuwait, and bronze at the 2008 Asian Judo Championships in Jeju City, South Korea.

Zhanzunova represented Kazakhstan at the 2008 Summer Olympics in Beijing, where she competed for the women's middleweight class (70 kg). Unfortunately, she lost the first preliminary match to Colombia's Yuri Alvear, who successfully scored an ippon and a soto makikomi (outer wraparound), at a fastest possible time of twenty-one seconds.
