= Heinrich Barnes =

South African wrestler

Heinrich Barnes (born 12 December 1986, in Pretoria, South Africa) is a South African former freestyle and folkstyle wrestler. He participated in the men's freestyle 66 kg at the 2008 Summer Olympics. He was eliminated in the 1/16 round, losing to Mongolian Buyanjavyn Batzorig. Barnes also competed in collegiate wrestling for two years at Oregon State University, where he earned All-American status by placing 8th at the 2009 NCAA Division I Wrestling Championships.
