= Yelena Ilyukhina =

Kazakhstani handball player

Personal information
- Nationality: Kazakhstani
- Born: 24 May 1982 (age 44) Kyzylorda, Kazakh SSR, Soviet Union

Sport
- Sport: Handball
National team
- Years: Team
- –: Kazakhstan

Yelena Ilyukhina (Елена Александровна Илюхина, born 24 May 1982) is a Kazakhstani handball player. She was born in Kyzylorda. She competed at the 2008 Summer Olympics in Beijing, where the Kazakhstani team placed 10th.
