= Andriy Stadnik =

Ukrainian wrestler (born 1982)

Medal record

Men's freestyle wrestling

Representing Ukraine

Olympic Games
| Silver medal – second place | 2008 Beijing | 66 kg |

World Championships
| Bronze medal – third place | 2006 Guangzhou | 66 kg |

World Cup
| Silver medal – second place | 2010 Moscow | 66 kg |
| Gold medal – first place | 2005 Tashkent | 66 kg |

European Championships
| Gold medal – first place | 2009 Vilnius | 66 kg |
| Bronze medal – third place | 2005 Varna | 66 kg |

Junior European Wrestling Championships
| Gold medal – first place | 2002 Tirana | 69 kg |

Andriy Volodymyrovych Stadnik (Андрій Володимирович Стаднік; born 15 April 1982) is a male wrestler from Ukraine. He won a silver medal in the Men's freestyle 66kg event at the 2008 Summer Olympics in Beijing. Andriy has been married to Mariya Stadnik, a wrestler from Ukraine who represents Azerbaijan. His sister, Yana Rattigan, is also a wrestler.
