= 2011 World Women's Handball Championship squads =

This article displays the squads for the 2011 World Women's Handball Championship, held in Brazil, the 20th edition of the event. Each team consisted of up to 18 players, of whom 16 may be fielded for each match. Appearances, goals and ages as of tournament start, December 2, 2011.

== Group A ==
=== Angola ===
Head coach: Vivaldo Eduardo

No.	Pos.	Name	Date of birth (age)	Height	App.	Goals	Club
1	GK	Maria Odeth Tavares	18 August 1976 (aged 35)	1.70 m	92	1	(Angola) Primeiro de Agosto
2	LW	Joelma Viegas	15 October 1986 (aged 25)	1.68 m	16	37	(Angola) Primeiro de Agosto
4	P	Elzira Barros	13 May 1980 (aged 31)	1.86 m	44	147	(Angola) Petro Atlético
6	P	Bombo Calandula	23 February 1983 (aged 28)	1.76 m	26	51	(Angola) Petro Atlético
7	RW	Carolina Morais	13 April 1986 (aged 25)	1.60 m	17	133	(Angola) Primeiro de Agosto
8	LB	Nair Almeida	23 January 1984 (aged 27)	1.81 m	79	142	(Angola) Primeiro de Agosto
9	CB	Isabel Guialo	8 April 1990 (aged 21)	1.72 m	5	10	(Angola) ASA
10	LW	Isabel Fernandes	5 June 1985 (aged 26)	1.84 m	63	181	(Angola) Petro Atlético
11	CB	Luisa Kiala	25 January 1982 (aged 29)	1.73 m	76	154	(Angola) Petro Atlético
12	GK	Neyde Barbosa	23 September 1980 (aged 31)	1.81 m	18	0	(Angola) Petro Atlético
13	RW	Matilde Andre	11 February 1986 (aged 25)	1.72 m	10	8	(Angola) Petro Atlético
14	CB	Natalia Bernardo	25 December 1986 (aged 24)	1.69 m	30	92	(Angola) Petro Atlético
15	RB	Azenaide Carlos	14 June 1990 (aged 21)	1.69 m	20	76	(Angola) Primeiro de Agosto
16	GK	Cristina Branco	15 March 1985 (aged 26)	1.74 m	38	0	(Angola) Primeiro de Agosto
18	LB	Marcelina Kiala	9 November 1979 (aged 32)	1.83 m	89	246	(Angola) Petro Atlético
20	CB	Rossana Quitongo	15 September 1990 (aged 21)	1.74 m	2	5	(Angola) Primeiro de Agosto

=== China ===
Head coach: Wang Xindong

No.	Pos.	Name	Date of birth (age)	Height	App.	Goals	Club
1	GK	Xu Mo	2 March 1990 (aged 21)	1.85 m	77	0	(China) Shanghai
2	RW	Wei Qiuxiang	15 February 1986 (aged 25)	1.77 m	130	70	(China) Jiangsu
3	P	Liu Yun	6 March 1982 (aged 29)	1.80 m	220	90	(China) Anhui
5	RB	Li Bing	21 January 1980 (aged 31)	1.81 m	260	120	(China) Army
6	RW	Wang Chanchan	20 July 1983 (aged 28)	1.75 m	150	75	(China) Army
7	RB	Luan Zheng	2 May 1984 (aged 27)	1.75 m	110	43	(China) Beijing
8	LW	Li Yao	7 June 1992 (aged 19)	1.72 m	90	41	(China) Anhui
9	RB	Lan Chunlei	21 February 1989 (aged 22)	1.77 m	55	23	(China) Shandong
10	LB	Wang Shasha	8 January 1987 (aged 24)	1.76 m	300	150	(China) Shandong
11	LW	Wu Nana	4 March 1990 (aged 21)	1.76 m	50	20	(China) Shanghai
16	GK	Zhu Yun	1 July 1989 (aged 22)	1.80 m	39	0	(China) Shandong
17	P	Sun Laimiao	8 April 1981 (aged 30)	1.76 m	276	105	(China) Anhui
18	P	Sha Zhengwen	18 June 1990 (aged 21)	1.90 m	150	77	(China) Shanghai
19	LB	Li Weiwei	7 July 1982 (aged 29)	1.78 m	350	190	(China) Army
20	LB	Lan Xiaoling	22 May 1993 (aged 18)	1.80 m	60	20	(China) Jiangsu
21	CB	Zhao Jiaqin	22 January 1986 (aged 25)	1.74 m	150	90	(China) Jiangsu
23	RB	Wu Yin	13 April 1988 (aged 23)	1.74 m	22	10	(China) Shanghai

=== Germany ===
Head coach: (Denmark) Heine Jensen

No.	Pos.	Name	Date of birth (age)	Height	App.	Goals	Club
1	GK	Sabine Englert	27 November 1981 (aged 30)	1.85 m	195	2	(Denmark) FC Midtjylland
3	RB	Isabell Klein	28 June 1984 (aged 27)	1.72 m	22	32	(Germany) Buxtehuder SV
6	LB	Franziska Mietzner	20 December 1988 (aged 22)	1.92 m	45	138	(Germany) Frankfurter HC
7	LW	Natalie Augsburg	15 November 1983 (aged 28)	1.76 m	22	35	(Germany) HC Leipzig
8	P	Anne Müller	5 July 1983 (aged 28)	1.77 m	115	157	(Germany) HC Leipzig
10	CB	Anna Loerper	18 November 1984 (aged 27)	1.64 m	147	268	(Denmark) Team Tvis Holstebro
12	GK	Katja Schülke	18 March 1984 (aged 27)	1.78 m	61	0	(Germany) HC Leipzig
13	CB	Nadine Krause	25 March 1982 (aged 29)	1.78 m	177	723	(Germany) TSV Bayer 04 Leverkusen
15	RW	Sabrina Richter	10 May 1982 (aged 29)	1.73 m	136	314	(Germany) HSG Blomberg-Lippe
16	GK	Clara Wöltering	2 March 1983 (aged 28)	1.78 m	125	0	(Montenegro) ŽRK Budućnost T-Mobile
17	LW	Katja Langkeit	22 November 1983 (aged 28)	1.70 m	6	11	(Germany) Buxtehuder SV
19	RB	Stefanie Mellbeck	16 April 1977 (aged 34)	1.74 m	206	436	(Germany) Buxtehuder SV
20	P	Anja Althaus	3 September 1982 (aged 29)	1.74 m	183	405	(Denmark) Viborg HK
21	LB	Nadja Nadgornaja	22 September 1988 (aged 23)	1.84 m	11	32	(Germany) Thüringer HC
31	CB	Kerstin Wohlbold	11 January 1984 (aged 27)	1.70 m	10	28	(Germany) Thüringer HC
33	P	Luisa Schulze	14 September 1990 (aged 21)	1.92 m	9	7	(Germany) HC Leipzig

=== Iceland ===
Head coach: Águst Þór Jóhannsson

No.	Pos.	Name	Date of birth (age)	Height	App.	Goals	Club
1	GK	Gudný Jenny Ásmundsdóttir	28 February 1982 (aged 29)	1.75 m	15	0	(Iceland) Valur
2	CB	Karen Knútsdóttir	4 February 1990 (aged 21)	1.67 m	33	76	(Germany) HSG Blomberg-Lippe
3	P	Arna Sif Pálsdóttir	5 January 1988 (aged 23)	1.84 m	63	69	(Denmark) Aalborg DH
4	RW	Þórey Rósa Stefánsdóttir	14 July 1989 (aged 22)	1.67 m	24	43	(Denmark) Team Tvis Holstebro
5	RB	Rut Árnfjórð Jónsdóttir	12 July 1990 (aged 21)	1.76 m	42	75	(Denmark) Team Tvis Holstebro
6	CB	Harpa Sif Eyjólfsdóttir	9 May 1987 (aged 24)	1.79 m	36	62	(Sweden) Spårvägens HF
8	LB	Stella Sigurðardóttir	30 March 1990 (aged 21)	1.81 m	37	61	(Iceland) Knattspyrnufélagið Fram
9	LW	Dagný Skúladóttir	10 May 1980 (aged 31)	1.68 m	87	223	(Iceland) Valur
12	GK	Sunneva Einarsdóttir	3 January 1990 (aged 21)		0	0	(Iceland) Valur
13	LW	Ásta Birna Gunnarsdóttir	29 October 1984 (aged 27)	1.65 m	50	68	(Iceland) Knattspyrnufélagið Fram
14	LB	Hrafnhildur Skúladóttir	9 August 1977 (aged 34)	1.77 m	138	559	(Iceland) Valur
15	RW	Hanna Guðrún Stefánsdóttir	11 February 1979 (aged 32)	1.64 m	109	416	(Iceland) Stjarnan
17	P	Anna Úrsúla Guðmundsdóttir	1 May 1985 (aged 26)	1.81 m	70	172	(Iceland) Valur
18	RB	Birna Berg Haraldsdóttir	21 June 1993 (aged 18)	1.81 m	5	9	(Iceland) Knattspyrnufélagið Fram
19	LB	Þorgerður Anna Atladóttir	2 June 1992 (aged 19)	1.78 m	12	8	(Iceland) Valur
23	CB	Ragnhildur Rósa Guðmundsdóttir	20 July 1984 (aged 27)	1.78 m	54	38	(Iceland) Valur

=== Montenegro ===
Head coach: Dragan Adžić

No.	Pos.	Name	Date of birth (age)	Height	App.	Goals	Club
1	GK	Marina Vukčević	24 August 1993 (aged 18)	1.78 m	23	0	(Montenegro) ŽRK Budućnost T-Mobile
2	RW	Radmila Miljanić	19 April 1988 (aged 23)	1.74 m	72	68	(Montenegro) ŽRK Budućnost T-Mobile
4	RW	Jovanka Radičević	23 October 1986 (aged 25)	1.69 m	74	435	(Hungary) Győri Audi ETO KC
5	P	Ana Đokić	9 February 1979 (aged 32)	1.69 m	4	13	(Montenegro) ŽRK Budućnost T-Mobile
8	LB	Marija Jovanović	26 December 1985 (aged 25)	1.82 m	69	360	(Romania) CS Oltchim Râmnicu Vâlcea
9	CB	Ana Radović	21 August 1986 (aged 25)	1.76 m	43	150	(Montenegro) ŽRK Budućnost T-Mobile
10	CB	Anđela Bulatović	15 January 1987 (aged 24)	1.75 m	64	126	(Montenegro) ŽRK Budućnost T-Mobile
12	GK	Sonja Barjaktarović	11 September 1986 (aged 25)	1.80 m	70	0	(Montenegro) ŽRK Budućnost T-Mobile
14	LW	Maja Savić	29 April 1976 (aged 35)	1.76 m	30	103	(Montenegro) ŽRK Budućnost T-Mobile
16	GK	Mirjana Milenković	14 March 1985 (aged 26)	1.83 m	44	0	(Spain) SD Itxako
17	LB	Bojana Popović	20 November 1979 (aged 32)	1.85 m	35	213	(Montenegro) ŽRK Budućnost T-Mobile
19	P	Sara Vukčević	25 March 1992 (aged 19)	1.83 m	3	3	(Hungary) Érdi VSE
20	RB	Jasna Tošković	16 March 1989 (aged 22)	1.89 m	2	3	(Hungary) Békéscsabai Előre NKSE
26	P	Suzana Lazović	28 January 1992 (aged 19)	1.76 m	36	58	(Montenegro) ŽRK Budućnost T-Mobile
32	RB	Katarina Bulatović	20 November 1984 (aged 27)	1.86 m	4	26	(Montenegro) ŽRK Budućnost T-Mobile
77	LW	Majda Mehmedović	25 May 1990 (aged 21)	1.69 m	36	62	(Montenegro) ŽRK Budućnost T-Mobile
90	CB	Milena Knežević	12 March 1990 (aged 21)	1.78 m	56	144	(Montenegro) ŽRK Budućnost T-Mobile

=== Norway ===
Head coach: (Iceland) Thorir Hergeirsson

No.	Pos.	Name	Date of birth (age)	Height	App.	Goals	Club
1	GK	Kari Aalvik Grimsbø	4 January 1985 (aged 26)	1.81 m	81	0	(Denmark) Team Esbjerg
2	LB	Mari Molid	8 August 1990 (aged 21)	1.78 m	28	24	(Norway) Byåsen HE
4	CB	Stine Bredal Oftedal	25 September 1991 (aged 20)	1.67 m	24	32	(Norway) Stabæk IF
5	P	Ida Alstad	13 June 1985 (aged 26)	1.72 m	52	133	(Norway) Byåsen HE
6	P	Heidi Løke	12 December 1982 (aged 28)	1.73 m	74	238	(Hungary) Győri Audi ETO KC
7	CB	Tonje Nøstvold	7 May 1985 (aged 26)	1.78 m	143	351	(Norway) Byåsen HE
8	CB	Karoline Dyhre Breivang	10 May 1980 (aged 31)	1.72 m	229	375	(Norway) Larvik HK
9	CB	Kristine Lunde-Borgersen	30 March 1980 (aged 31)	1.83 m	149	441	(Norway) IK Våg
11	LW	Kari Mette Johansen	11 January 1979 (aged 32)	1.72 m	177	453	(Norway) Larvik HK
13	P	Marit Malm Frafjord	25 November 1985 (aged 26)	1.82 m	134	288	(Denmark) Viborg HK
16	GK	Katrine Lunde Haraldsen	30 March 1980 (aged 31)	1.81 m	181	3	(Hungary) Győri Audi ETO KC
17	RB	Linn Jørum Sulland	15 July 1984 (aged 27)	1.78 m	94	224	(Norway) Larvik HK
18	RW	Linn-Kristin Riegelhuth	1 August 1984 (aged 27)	1.75 m	184	696	(Norway) Larvik HK
21	CB	Gøril Snorroeggen	15 February 1985 (aged 26)	1.77 m	75	176	(Denmark) Team Esbjerg
22	RB	Amanda Kurtović	25 July 1991 (aged 20)	1.75 m	14	34	(Norway) Larvik HK
23	LW	Camilla Herrem	8 October 1986 (aged 25)	1.67 m	90	240	(Norway) Byåsen HE

== Group B ==
=== Australia ===
Head coach: (Japan) Katsuhiko Kinoshita

No.	Pos.	Name	Date of birth (age)	Height	App.	Goals	Club
1	GK	Jemima Harbort	4 September 1987 (aged 24)	1.80 m	14	0	(Australia) NTH Panthers
2	CB	Victoria Fletcher	12 April 1993 (aged 18)	1.74 m	4	2	(Sweden) Spårvägens GoIF
3	P	Allira Hudson-Gofers	17 April 1982 (aged 29)	1.83 m	20	35	(Australia) University of Sydney
4	LW	Melissa Condon	1 October 1991 (aged 20)	1.71 m	2	0	(Australia) Monash University
5	P	Clare Murray	24 March 1988 (aged 23)	1.80 m	2	0	(Australia) University of Queensland
6	LW	Veronica Kelly	1 January 1985 (aged 26)	1.65 m	12	12	(Australia) University of Queensland
7	W/B	Alice Keighley	21 October 1987 (aged 24)	1.72 m	6	10	(Australia) ACT Handball
9	RW	Mary Kelly	1 January 1985 (aged 26)	1.65 m	16	35	(Australia) University of Queensland
10	CB	Daniela Cook	16 March 1978 (aged 33)	1.76 m	2	6	(Australia) University of Sydney
12	GK	Catherine Kent	15 January 1981 (aged 30)	1.72 m	58	1	(France) Mios Biganos Handball
14	CB	Madeleine McAfee	5 February 1993 (aged 18)	1.74 m	14	4	(Australia) Griffith University
15	CB	Kimberly Tennant	16 January 1985 (aged 26)	1.62 m	14	12	(Australia) Monash University
16	CB	Rosalind Boyd	21 October 1987 (aged 24)	1.78 m	30	50	(Australia) Griffith University

=== Kazakhstan ===
Head coach: (South Korea) Yoon Tae-Il

No.	Pos.	Name	Date of birth (age)	Height	App.	Goals	Club
1	GK	Tatyana Konstantinova	7 September 1984 (aged 27)	1.85 m	27	0	(Russia) HC Lada Togliatti
3	CB	Anastassiya Batuyeva	7 September 1987 (aged 24)	1.67 m	16	36	(Kazakhstan) Astana Handball
4	LB	Elena Klimenko	30 July 1988 (aged 23)	1.67 m	12	38	(Kazakhstan) Astana Handball
5	RW	Anna Nikitina	16 April 1987 (aged 24)	1.67 m	9	18	(Kazakhstan) Adil Ustkamenogorsk
6	RW	Snezhana Kurgambaeva	11 June 1990 (aged 21)	1.67 m	0	0	(Kazakhstan) Akzhayik Handball
7	CB	Kristina Nedopekina	30 May 1989 (aged 22)	1.78 m	15	27	(Kazakhstan) Zvezda Handball
8	P	Irina Baranovskaya	2 July 1986 (aged 25)	1.80 m	15	39	(Kazakhstan) Zvezda Handball
9	RW	Xeniya Volnukhina	17 November 1982 (aged 29)	1.73 m	15	50	(Kazakhstan) Astana Handball
11	P	Yelena Suyazova	15 June 1989 (aged 22)	1.90 m	44	23	(Kazakhstan) Almaty Handball
12	GK	Tatyana Parfenova	1 June 1985 (aged 26)	1.83 m	45	0	(Kazakhstan) Almaty Handball
13	RB	Natalya Kulakova	27 October 1985 (aged 26)	1.75 m	25	48	(Kazakhstan) Astana Handball
14	LB	Yevgeniya Latkina	14 March 1992 (aged 19)	1.74 m	22	37	(Kazakhstan) Ili Handball
16	GK	Zhannat Aitenova	5 November 1989 (aged 22)	1.80 m	12	0	(Kazakhstan) Seihun-KAM Handball
17	LW	Gulzira Iskakova	4 November 1988 (aged 23)	1.70 m	22	33	(Kazakhstan) Seihun-KAM Handball
19	LB	Natalya Yakovleva	29 September 1986 (aged 25)	1.80 m	45	60	(Kazakhstan) Almaty Handball

=== Netherlands ===
Head coach: Henk Groener

No.	Pos.	Name	Date of birth (age)	Height	App.	Goals	Club
1	GK	Marieke van der Wal	7 November 1979 (aged 32)	1.83 m	126	0	(France) Cergy Pontoise HB 95
2	GK	Ingeborg Roelofs	27 November 1983 (aged 28)	1.78 m	65	0	(Netherlands) Westfriesland/SEW
5	LB	Jessy Kramer	16 February 1990 (aged 21)	1.78 m	20	17	(Germany) Frankfurter HC
6	RB	Laura van der Heijden	27 June 1990 (aged 21)	1.72 m	65	128	(Germany) VfL Oldenburg
7	RW	Debbie Bont	9 December 1990 (aged 20)	1.74 m	41	85	(Netherlands) Succes Schoonmak/VOC Amsterdam
8	LB	Lois Abbingh	13 August 1992 (aged 19)	1.77 m	30	94	(Germany) VfL Oldenburg
9	LW	Joyce Hilster	1 June 1983 (aged 28)	1.73 m	104	221	(Germany) Bayer 04 Leverkusen
10	P	Danick Snelder	22 May 1990 (aged 21)	1.78 m	43	105	(Germany) Thüringer HC
12	P	Diane Lamein	18 October 1979 (aged 32)	1.70 m	287	597	(Germany) Buxtehuder SV
13	P	Yvette Broch	23 December 1990 (aged 20)	1.85 m	10	16	(France) Metz Handball
14	RB	Willemijn Karsten	28 June 1986 (aged 25)	1.73 m	93	110	(Germany) HC Thüringer
15	CB	Maura Visser	1 June 1985 (aged 26)	1.78 m	114	409	(Germany) HC Leipzig
19	CB	Pearl van der Wissel	14 April 1984 (aged 27)	1.71 m	200	523	(Denmark) SK Aarhus Elitehåndbold
20	RB	Roxanne Bovenberg	30 July 1989 (aged 22)	1.70 m	34	46	(Germany) Bayer 04 Leverkusen
26	RW	Angela Malestein	31 January 1993 (aged 18)	1.74 m	33	36	(Netherlands) MiZuWaAi Dalfsen
79	CB	Estavana Polman	5 August 1992 (aged 19)	1.74 m	14	28	(Denmark) SønderjyskE
88	GK	Mandy Burrekers	10 January 1988 (aged 23)	1.79 m	13	1	(Germany) Frankfurter HC

=== Russia ===
Head coach: Yevgeni Trefilov

No.	Pos.	Name	Date of birth (age)	Height	App.	Goals	Club
2	LW	Polina Kuznetcova	10 June 1987 (aged 24)	1.70 m	65	173	(Russia) Zvezda Zvenigorod
5	LB	Lyudmila Postnova	11 August 1984 (aged 27)	1.83 m	151	553	(Russia) Zvezda Zvenigorod
7	P	Liudmila Bodnieva	15 October 1978 (aged 33)	1.80 m	124	401	(Slovenia) RK Krim
9	RW	Yana Uskova	28 September 1985 (aged 26)	1.68 m	80	124	(Russia) Zvezda Zvenigorod
10	RB	Ekaterina Davydenko	7 March 1989 (aged 22)	1.84 m	31	102	(Russia) Lada Togliatti
11	CB	Olga Levina	4 March 1985 (aged 26)	1.80 m	83	227	(Russia) HC Dinamo Volgograd
12	GK	Anna Sedoykina	1 August 1984 (aged 27)	1.90 m	70	2	(Russia) HC Dinamo Volgograd
15	P	Natalia Shipilova	31 December 1979 (aged 31)	1.86 m	141	284	(Russia) Lada Togliatti
16	GK	Maria Sidorova	21 August 1979 (aged 32)	1.78 m	147	2	(Russia) Lada Togliatti
17	CB	Yekaterina Andryushina	17 August 1985 (aged 26)	1.85 m	82	195	(France) Metz Handball
18	CB	Nadezhda Muravyeva	30 June 1980 (aged 31)	1.86 m	142	307	(Russia) Lada Togliatti
21	LB	Victoria Zhilinskayte	6 March 1989 (aged 22)	1.88 m	48	69	(Russia) Lada Togliatti
24	RB	Irina Bliznova	6 October 1986 (aged 25)	1.83 m	69	222	(Russia) Lada Togliatti
25	LW	Emiliya Turey	6 October 1984 (aged 27)	1.75 m	148	495	(Russia) Rostov-Don
26	CB	Tatiana Khmyrova	6 February 1990 (aged 21)	1.78 m	33	118	(Russia) HC Dinamo Volgograd
29	RW	Olga Chernoivanenko	17 April 1989 (aged 22)	1.75 m	25	43	(Russia) Lada Togliatti

=== South Korea ===
Head coach: Kang Jae-Won

No.	Pos.	Name	Date of birth (age)	Height	App.	Goals	Club
1	GK	Ju Hui	4 November 1989 (aged 22)	1.74 m			(South Korea) Kyung-Nam
2	RW	Woo Sun-hee	1 July 1978 (aged 33)	1.70 m			(South Korea) Samcheok Handball
3	RW	Kim On-a	1 July 1988 (aged 23)	1.69 m			(South Korea) IUDC Handball Club
5	RW	Jung Yu-ra	6 February 1992 (aged 19)	1.70 m			(South Korea) Daegu Handball
7	LW	Jang So-hee	15 March 1978 (aged 33)	1.61 m			(Japan) Sony Semiconductor
9	P	Kim Cha-youn	10 February 1981 (aged 30)	1.74 m			(Japan) Omron Corporation
11	RB	Yoon Hyun-kyung	22 June 1986 (aged 25)	1.71 m			(South Korea) Seoul Doosan Bears
12	GK	Moon Kyeong-ha	29 May 1980 (aged 31)	1.74 m			(South Korea) Kyung-Nam
13	P	Kim Cheong-sim	8 February 1976 (aged 35)	1.78 m			(South Korea) Yongin Handball
14	RW	Kim Seon-hwa	7 January 1991 (aged 20)	1.62 m			(South Korea) IUDC Handball Club
17	LB	Sim Hae-in	31 October 1987 (aged 24)	1.76 m			(South Korea) Samcheok Handball
19	RB	Choi Im-jeong	14 October 1981 (aged 30)	1.82 m			(South Korea) Daegu Handball
20	LB	Jung Ji-hae	6 March 1985 (aged 26)	1.66 m			(South Korea) Samcheok Handball
21	CB	Kwon Geun-hae	30 December 1987 (aged 23)	1.65 m			(South Korea) Yongin Handball
22	LW	Lee Eun-bi	23 October 1990 (aged 21)	1.62 m			(South Korea) Busan Handball
24	LB	Kim Jin-yi	20 June 1993 (aged 18)	1.81 m			(South Korea) Hwangji Handball

=== Spain ===
Head coach: Jorge Dueñas

No.	Pos.	Name	Date of birth (age)	Height	App.	Goals	Club
1	GK	Cristina González	8 June 1983 (aged 28)	1.79 m	79	0	(Spain) Cleba León
3	CB	Andrea Barnó	1 April 1980 (aged 31)	1.74 m	63	79	(Spain) SD Itxako
4	RW	Carmen Martín	29 May 1988 (aged 23)	1.69 m	91	230	(Spain) SD Itxako
6	LB	Nely Carla Alberto	2 July 1983 (aged 28)	1.79 m	64	134	(France) Le Hâvre ACH
8	P	Verónica Cuadrado	8 March 1979 (aged 32)	1.82 m	134	160	(Denmark) Randers HK
9	RB	Marta Mangué	23 April 1983 (aged 28)	1.70 m	179	732	(Serbia) R.K. Zaječar
10	CB	Macarena Aguilar	8 June 1985 (aged 26)	1.70 m	126	384	(Spain) SD Itxako
12	GK	Silvia Navarro	20 March 1979 (aged 32)	1.65 m	45	2	(Spain) SD Itxako
13	RW	Jessica Alonso	20 September 1983 (aged 28)	1.75 m	49	104	(Spain) SD Itxako
14	P	Elisabet Chávez	17 November 1990 (aged 21)	1.92 m	51	14	(Spain) BM Sagunto
17	LW	Elisabeth Pinedo	13 May 1981 (aged 30)	1.74 m	95	179	(Spain) Akaba Bera Bera
21	LW	Vanesa Amorós	7 December 1982 (aged 28)	1.67 m	65	68	(Spain) CB Mar Alicante
25	LB	Nerea Pena	13 December 1989 (aged 21)	1.75 m	31	87	(Spain) SD Itxako
29	LB	Patricia Pinedo	13 May 1981 (aged 30)	1.72 m	37	72	(Spain) SD Itxako
30	LB	Patricia Elorza	8 April 1984 (aged 27)	1.80 m	15	12	(Spain) BM Castro
39	GK	Mihaela Ciobanu	30 January 1973 (aged 38)	1.75 m	46	0	(Spain) BM Alcobendas

== Group C ==
=== Brazil ===
Head coach: (Denmark) Morten Soubak

No.	Pos.	Name	Date of birth (age)	Height	App.	Goals	Club
1	GK	Chana Masson	18 December 1978 (aged 32)	1.83 m	173	4	(Denmark) Randers HK
2	P	Fabiana Diniz	20 June 1983 (aged 28)	1.80 m	129	216	(Spain) Akaba Bera Bera HB
3	RW	Alexandra do Nascimento	16 September 1981 (aged 30)	1.77 m	106	311	(Austria) Hypo Niederösterreich
4	LW	Dayane Rocha	24 March 1991 (aged 20)	1.68 m	18	14	(Brazil) Metodista SBC
5	P	Daniela Piedade	2 March 1979 (aged 32)	1.73 m	110	196	(Austria) Hypo Niederösterreich
7	P	Alessandra Medeiros	7 October 1981 (aged 30)	1.85 m	92	154	(Brazil) Santo André SBC
8	LW	Fernanda da Silva	25 September 1989 (aged 22)	1.76 m	42	129	(Austria) Hypo Niederösterreich
9	CB	Ana Paula Rodrigues	18 October 1987 (aged 24)	1.72 m	67	221	(Austria) Hypo Niederösterreich
10	RW	Jéssica Quintino	16 April 1991 (aged 20)	1.76 m	25	58	(Brazil) A.D. Blumenau
12	GK	Bárbara Arenhart	4 October 1986 (aged 25)	1.82 m	47	0	(Austria) Hypo Niederösterreich
15	LB	Silvia Pinheiro	11 January 1981 (aged 30)	1.78 m	102	248	(Austria) Hypo Niederösterreich
17	LB	Moniky Bancilon	7 May 1990 (aged 21)	1.84 m	8	19	(Brazil) Metodista São Bernardo
18	LB	Eduarda Amorim	23 September 1986 (aged 25)	1.86 m	94	310	(Hungary) Győri Audi ETO KC
20	RB	Francine Moraes	1 January 1981 (aged 30)	1.72 m	99	108	(Austria) Hypo Niederösterreich
22	CB	Mayara Moura	5 December 1986 (aged 24)	1.70 m	46	83	(France) Mios Bigamos HB
81	RB	Deonise Cavaleiro	20 June 1983 (aged 28)	1.80 m	73	164	(Spain) SD Itxako

=== Cuba ===
Head coach: Lorenze Verdecía Maturell

No.	Pos.	Name	Date of birth (age)	Height	App.	Goals	Club
1	GK	Maidelis Saldiña	15 May 1988 (aged 23)	1.77 m	43		(Cuba) Matanzas
2	W	Maricet Fernández	6 December 1989 (aged 21)	1.68 m	22		(Cuba) Habana
3	W	Ayliny Martínez	12 April 1979 (aged 32)	1.70 m	83		(Cuba) Habana
6	P	Ariagne Cuesta	22 August 1987 (aged 24)	1.76 m	36		(Cuba) Matanzas
7	B	Suleiky Gómez	21 July 1984 (aged 27)	1.79 m	93		(Cuba) Habana
9	B	Lizandra Lusson	29 September 1986 (aged 25)	1.71 m	75		(Cuba) Habana
12	GK	Yizenia Aldama	25 May 1989 (aged 22)	1.68 m	5		(Cuba) GRM
14	W	Maidoly Poumier	2 January 1984 (aged 27)	1.69 m	31		(Cuba) Habana
15	CB	Naddazza Valera	2 March 1987 (aged 24)	1.76 m	65		(Cuba) Matanzas
16	GK	Eneleidis Guevara	4 August 1986 (aged 25)	1.75 m	58		(Cuba) Matanzas
17	W	Lisandra Espinosa	29 September 1986 (aged 25)	1.65 m	23		(Cuba) Matanzas
18	B	Yenma Ramírez	12 February 1984 (aged 27)	1.78 m	42		(Cuba) Guantánamo
19	W	Milena Mesa	26 June 1993 (aged 18)	1.69 m	15		(Cuba) Holguín

=== France ===
Head coach: Olivier Krumbholz

No.	Pos.	Name	Date of birth (age)	Height	App.	Goals	Club
2	P	Amélie Goudjo	19 April 1980 (aged 31)	1.73 m	73	108	(France) Issy Paris Hand
3	RW	Blandine Dancette	14 February 1988 (aged 23)	1.69 m	23	33	(France) USAM Nîmes
4	P	Nina Kamto Njitam	25 June 1983 (aged 28)	1.78 m	133	233	(France) Metz Handball
5	RB	Camille Ayglon	21 May 1985 (aged 26)	1.81 m	110	234	(France) USAM Nîmes
6	CB	Angélique Spincer	25 June 1984 (aged 27)	1.76 m	56	224	(France) Issy Paris Hand
7	CB	Allison Pineau	2 May 1989 (aged 22)	1.81 m	97	237	(France) Metz Handball
8	RB	Claudine Mendy	8 January 1990 (aged 21)	1.82 m	55	108	(France) Metz Handball
9	LW	Paule Baudouin	25 October 1984 (aged 27)	1.72 m	132	343	(France) Le Havre AC Handball
12	GK	Amandine Leynaud	2 May 1986 (aged 25)	1.78 m	104	1	(France) Metz Handball
14	RB	Marie-Paule Gnabouyou	4 March 1988 (aged 23)	1.85 m	27	29	(France) Toulon St-Cyr Var Handball
15	LB	Audrey Bruneau	21 September 1992 (aged 19)	1.89 m	12	2	(France) Issy Paris Hand
16	GK	Cléopâtre Darleux	1 July 1989 (aged 22)	1.76 m	64	0	(France) Arvor 29
17	LW	Siraba Dembélé	28 June 1986 (aged 25)	1.72 m	109	278	(France) Toulon St-Cyr Var Handball
18	RW	Audrey Deroin	6 September 1989 (aged 22)	1.76 m	63	83	(France) Toulon St-Cyr Var Handball
20	LW	Raphaëlle Tervel	21 April 1979 (aged 32)	1.78 m	212	338	(Spain) SD Itxako
24	LB	Mariama Signaté	22 July 1985 (aged 26)	1.86 m	104	318	(France) Issy Paris Hand
64	RB	Alexandra Lacrabère	27 April 1987 (aged 24)	1.77 m	76	180	(France) Arvor 29

=== Japan ===
Head coach: (South Korea) Hwang Kyun-young

No.	Pos.	Name	Date of birth (age)	Height	App.	Goals	Club
2		Satoko Kuroki	11 January 1986 (aged 25)	1.63 m	12	8	(Japan) Sony Semiconductor
4		Shiori Kamimachi	21 January 1981 (aged 30)	1.65 m	31	129	(Japan) Hokkoku Bank
5		Aimi Ito	7 May 1983 (aged 28)	1.69 m	29	21	(Japan) MIE violet' IRIS
6		Akie Uegaki	25 July 1984 (aged 27)	1.73 m	68	204	(Japan) Hiroshima Maple Reds
8		Kaori Onozawa	25 July 1979 (aged 32)	1.69 m	51	73	(Japan) Hokkoku Bank
10		Shio Fujii	27 March 1985 (aged 26)	1.64 m	69	315	(Japan) Omron Corporation
11		Yumiko Yamano	27 July 1988 (aged 23)	1.67 m	5	7	(Japan) Sony Semiconductor
12	GK	Kumi Mori	17 January 1985 (aged 26)	1.70 m	15	0	(Japan) MIE violet' IRIS
13		Haruka Wakaizumi	9 May 1987 (aged 24)	1.71 m	9	4	(Japan) Hokkoku Bank
14		Karina Maki	13 July 1982 (aged 29)	1.68 m	39	31	(Japan) Omron Corporation
16	GK	Hiromi Tashiro	15 March 1982 (aged 29)	1.79 m	38	1	(Japan) Hokkoku Bank
17		Yuko Arihama	18 August 1984 (aged 27)	1.78 m	81	210	(Japan) Omron Corporation
20		Mayuko Ishitate	18 January 1987 (aged 24)	1.66 m	29	51	(Japan) Omron Corporation
22	GK	Kaori Fujima	6 July 1982 (aged 29)	1.73 m	26	0	(Japan) Omron Corporation
23		Aiko Hayafune	23 January 1980 (aged 31)	1.66 m	79	246	(Japan) MIE violet' IRIS
28		Shiori Nagata	24 October 1987 (aged 24)	1.71 m	9	13	(Japan) Omron Corporation

=== Romania ===
Head coach: Radu Voina

No.	Pos.	Name	Date of birth (age)	Height	App.	Goals	Club
2	RW	Ramona Farcău	14 July 1979 (aged 32)	1.68 m	196	656	(Romania) CS Oltchim Râmnicu Vâlcea
4	P	Florina Bârsan-Chintoan	6 December 1985 (aged 25)	1.76 m	86	101	(Romania) CS Universitatea Jolidon Cluj-Napoca
5	LB	Carmen Amariei	3 September 1978 (aged 33)	1.82 m	173	843	(Romania) Z-Terom Iași
7	RW	Adriana Nechita-Olteanu	14 November 1983 (aged 28)	1.67 m	91	200	(Romania) CS Oltchim Râmnicu Vâlcea
9	CB	Aurelia Brădeanu	5 May 1979 (aged 32)	1.79 m	211	514	(Romania) CS Oltchim Râmnicu Vâlcea
11	P	Oana Manea	18 April 1985 (aged 26)	1.76 m	132	181	(Romania) CS Oltchim Râmnicu Vâlcea
12	GK	Tereza Pîslaru	28 April 1982 (aged 29)	1.86 m	113	0	(Serbia) RK Zaječar
13	RW	Cristina Vărzaru	5 December 1979 (aged 31)	1.64 m	169	478	(Denmark) Viborg HK
15	LW	Valentina Ardean-Elisei	5 June 1982 (aged 29)	1.71 m	170	701	(Romania) CS Oltchim Râmnicu Vâlcea
16	GK	Denisa Dedu	27 September 1994 (aged 17)	1.82 m	2	0	(Romania) CS Corona Brașov
17	RB	Oana Șoit	3 May 1981 (aged 30)	1.67 m	63	66	(Romania) CS Oltchim Râmnicu Vâlcea
18	LB	Adina Fiera	11 August 1985 (aged 26)	1.80 m	150	350	(Romania) CS Oltchim Râmnicu Vâlcea
19	LW	Iulia Pușcașu	8 April 1982 (aged 29)	1.72 m	63	141	(Romania) CS Oltchim Râmnicu Vâlcea
20	CB	Mihaela Tivadar	16 June 1982 (aged 29)	1.78 m	92	89	(Romania) CS Universitatea Jolidon Cluj-Napoca
21	GK	Talida Tolnai	21 August 1979 (aged 32)	1.87 m	111	1	(Romania) CS Oltchim Râmnicu Vâlcea
23	CB	Daniela Băbeanu	18 November 1988 (aged 23)	1.79 m	3	7	(Romania) CS Oltchim Râmnicu Vâlcea
85	LB	Carmen Cartaș	9 May 1985 (aged 26)	1.78 m	24	29	(Romania) CSM Cetate Devatrans Deva

=== Tunisia ===
Head coach: Mohamed Ali Sghir

No.	Pos.	Name	Date of birth (age)	Height	App.	Goals	Club
1	GK	Rahma Tered	28 March 1988 (aged 23)	1.75 m	13	0	(Tunisia) ASF Sahel
3	RB	Nesrine Daoula	9 April 1990 (aged 21)	1.72 m	12	8	(France) Celles-sur-Belle Handball
6	P	Asma Elghaoui	29 August 1991 (aged 20)	1.70 m	15	47	(Tunisia) Ribat Monastir
8	LW	Jihene Ben Cheikh Ahmed	21 December 1985 (aged 25)	1.60 m	36	65	(Tunisia) ES Rejiche
10	LB	Raja Toumi	3 April 1978 (aged 33)	1.79 m	193	802	(Norway) Byåsen HE
12	GK	Wafa Cherif	6 April 1986 (aged 25)	1.73 m	80	0	(Tunisia) A.S.F. Sfax
17	RB	Ouided Kilani	15 June 1982 (aged 29)	1.76 m	141	215	(France) Abbeville Handball
18	RB	Haifa Abdelhak	31 October 1982 (aged 29)	1.72 m	166	626	(France) Octeville Handball
19	RW	Rafika Marzouk	27 October 1979 (aged 32)	1.76 m	163	572	(France) CJF Fleury Loiret HB
20	CB	Mouna Chebbah	8 July 1982 (aged 29)	1.70 m	188	774	(Denmark) Viborg HK
22	LB	Maroua Dhaouadi	22 May 1992 (aged 19)	1.75 m	0	0	(Tunisia) CSF Bizerte
24	LB	Ines Khouildi	11 March 1985 (aged 26)	1.83 m	88	215	(France) Mios Biganos Handball
27	P	Sihem Aouini	9 June 1982 (aged 29)	1.85 m	36	71	(Spain) Porriño
29	P	Faten Yahiaoui	1 May 1985 (aged 26)	1.71 m	0	0	(France) Noisy Handball
30	LB	Ines Jaouadi	15 September 1989 (aged 22)	1.83 m	59	163	(Tunisia) ASF Sahel
85	GK	Echraf Abdallah	14 January 1987 (aged 24)	1.81 m	0	0	(Tunisia) ES Rejiche

== Group D ==
=== Argentina ===
Head coach: (Spain) Miguel Interllige

No.	Pos.	Name	Date of birth (age)	Height	App.	Goals	Club
1	GK	Silvina Schlesinger	28 March 1985 (aged 26)	1.77 m	63	1	(Argentina) Estudiantes de La Plata
2	LW	Luciana Salvado	13 April 1990 (aged 21)	1.70 m	39	83	(Argentina) Ferro C.O.
3	LB	Manuela Pizzo	13 November 1991 (aged 20)	1.77 m	11	21	(Argentina) Estudiantes de La Plata
4	RB	Lucia Haro	21 August 1986 (aged 25)	1.70 m	33	72	(Argentina) Universitario Eléctrica
5	RW	Bibiana Ferrea	3 December 1980 (aged 30)	1.63 m	103	231	(Argentina) S.E.D.A.L.O
6	LB	Magdalena Decilio	23 March 1983 (aged 28)	1.73 m	93	239	(Argentina) Estudiantes de La Plata
7	LW	Maria Pilar Romero	22 May 1982 (aged 29)	1.67 m	80	126	(Argentina) Estudiantes de La Plata
8	RW	Florencia Aimone	23 November 1990 (aged 21)	1.70 m	20	10	(Argentina) Ballester
9	RB	Luciana Mendoza	14 March 1990 (aged 21)	1.72 m	48	191	(Argentina) S.E.D.A.L.O
10	CB	Victoria Crivelli	30 September 1990 (aged 21)	1.75 m	41	162	(Argentina) Ferro C.O.
11	RB	Solange Tagliavini	22 January 1985 (aged 26)	1.78 m	28	37	(Argentina) Dorrego Handball
12	GK	Valentina Kogan	19 March 1980 (aged 31)	1.74 m	107	2	(Argentina) S.E.D.A.L.O
13	P	Antonela Mena	28 March 1988 (aged 23)	1.83 m	38	91	(Spain) BM Bera Bera
14	CB	Valeria Bianchi	16 September 1985 (aged 26)	1.70 m	56	151	(Argentina) Luján Handball
15	CB	Silvana Totolo	14 October 1986 (aged 25)	1.64 m	80	163	(Argentina) S.E.D.A.L.O
17	P	Lucia Giamberardino	6 March 1990 (aged 21)	1.79 m	23	48	(Spain) Lleida Handball

=== Ivory Coast ===
Head coach: (France) Thierry Vincent

No.	Pos.	Name	Date of birth (age)	Height	App.	Goals	Club
1	GK	Amenan Koffi	5 October 1978 (aged 33)	1.72 m			(France) Merignac HB
2	LB	Rachelle Kouyo	24 May 1983 (aged 28)	1.81 m			(France) Aunay Handball
3	LW	Won Hire Coulibaly	19 September 1989 (aged 22)	1.70 m			(Tunisia) Club Africain
5	CB	N'Cho Elodie Mambo	30 March 1981 (aged 30)	1.72 m			(France) Merignac HB
7	RW	Yohou Christiane Guede	23 August 1978 (aged 33)	1.69 m			(France) Poitiers Handball
8	RB	Alimata Dosso	16 February 1979 (aged 32)	1.75 m			(France) Abbeville HB
9	P	Paula Gondo-Bredou	10 December 1981 (aged 29)	1.80 m			(France) Toulon St-Cyr Var Handball
10	LW	Sery Toualy	19 January 1986 (aged 25)	1.68 m			(France) Stella Saint-Maur
13	RB	Badjo Edwige Lobouet	27 December 1989 (aged 21)	1.78 m			(Tunisia) Club Africain
14	CB	Likane Julie Toualy	7 April 1976 (aged 35)	1.67 m			(Tunisia) Club Africain
15	P	Ndoua Lydie Yamkou	4 May 1984 (aged 27)	1.70 m			(Ivory Coast) Rombo Sport Kpouebo
16	GK	Ndri Elise Kangah	17 November 1983 (aged 28)	1.79 m			(France) Bergerac HB
17	LB	Mariam Traore	2 February 1980 (aged 31)	1.77 m			(France) Bergerac HB
18	RW	Amon Olive Assemon	12 November 1987 (aged 24)	1.68 m			(Tunisia) Club Africain
19	LB	Awa Karamoko	12 April 1985 (aged 26)	1.76 m			(France) Celle-sur-Belle
21	LB	Annabelle Courcelles	9 April 1989 (aged 22)	1.67 m			(France) Rochouart

=== Croatia ===
Head coach: Vladimir Canjuga

No.	Pos.	Name	Date of birth (age)	Height	App.	Goals	Club
1	GK	Jelena Grubišić	20 January 1987 (aged 24)	1.84 m	76	5	(Slovenia) RK Krim
2	CB	Miranda Tatari	20 September 1983 (aged 28)	1.74 m	91	248	(Croatia) RK Podravka Koprivnica
3	CB	Tanja Kiridžić	7 July 1986 (aged 25)	1.71 m	7	9	(Croatia) ŽRK Arena Pula
5	RW	Dijana Jovetić	21 May 1984 (aged 27)	1.70 m	152	375	(Montenegro) ŽRK Budućnost T-Mobile
6	P	Andrea Šerić	3 May 1985 (aged 26)	1.84 m	37	42	(Slovenia) RK Krim
7	RB	Ivana Petković	6 June 1985 (aged 26)	1.77 m	22	38	(Croatia) RK Podravka Koprivnica
8	RW	Anita Gaće	14 April 1983 (aged 28)	1.77 m	107	138	(Croatia) RK Podravka Koprivnica
10	LW	Nikica Pušić-Koroljević	19 March 1983 (aged 28)	1.77 m	152	340	(Croatia) RK Podravka Koprivnica
12	GK	Marta Žderić	20 April 1990 (aged 21)	1.83 m	20	0	(Croatia) RK Podravka Koprivnica
13	RB	Lidija Horvat	5 May 1982 (aged 29)	1.84 m	134	286	(Croatia) RK Podravka Koprivnica
14	LB	Kristina Franić	22 May 1987 (aged 24)	1.80 m	93	321	(Slovenia) RK Krim
15	LB	Andrea Penezić	13 November 1985 (aged 26)	1.86 m	92	355	(Slovenia) RK Krim
16	GK	Ivana Jelčić	16 March 1980 (aged 31)	1.79 m	171	0	(Croatia) RK Podravka Koprivnica
18	CB	Ivana Lovrić	1 September 1984 (aged 27)	1.73 m	49	74	(Croatia) RK Samobor
19	LW	Maja Zebić	3 May 1982 (aged 29)	1.77 m	129	287	(Spain) SD Itxako
20	P	Vesna Milanović-Litre	3 May 1986 (aged 25)	1.80 m	53	81	(Croatia) RK Podravka Koprivnica
27	P	Katarina Ježić	19 December 1992 (aged 18)	1.73 m	4	1	(Croatia) RK Lokomotiva Zagreb

=== Denmark ===
Head coach: Jan Pytlick

No.	Pos.	Name	Date of birth (age)	Height	App.	Goals	Club
1	GK	Sandra Toft	18 October 1989 (aged 22)	1.76 m	14	0	(Denmark) Team Tvis Holstebro
2	P	Mette Melgaard	3 June 1980 (aged 31)	1.70 m	56	69	(Denmark) Randers HK
3	RW	Maibritt Kviesgaard	15 May 1986 (aged 25)	1.72 m	80	181	(Denmark) FC Midtjylland Håndbold
4	P	Susan Thorsgaard	13 October 1988 (aged 23)	1.89 m	51	97	(Denmark) FC Midtjylland Håndbold
7	LW	Maria Fisker	3 October 1990 (aged 21)	1.70 m	10	35	(Denmark) Viborg HK
10	CB	Christina Krogshede	4 November 1981 (aged 30)	1.72 m	65	106	(Denmark) FIF Handball
12	GK	Karin Mortensen	26 September 1977 (aged 34)	1.82 m	204	4	(Denmark) FIF Handball
15	LB	Pernille Larsen	6 September 1984 (aged 27)	1.84 m	49	48	(Denmark) Viborg HK
16	GK	Christina Pedersen	15 December 1982 (aged 28)	1.82 m	80	1	(Denmark) Viborg HK
18	RB	Louise Burgaard	17 October 1992 (aged 19)	1.78 m	5	1	(Denmark) Team Tvis Holstebro
19	RB	Line Jørgensen	31 December 1989 (aged 21)	1.86 m	52	131	(Denmark) FC Midtjylland Håndbold
21	CB	Kristina Kristiansen	13 July 1989 (aged 22)	1.63 m	46	101	(Denmark) Team Tvis Holstebro
22	LB	Trine Troelsen	2 May 1985 (aged 26)	1.72 m	101	247	(Denmark) FC Midtjylland Håndbold
23	LW	Ann Grete Nørgaard	15 September 1983 (aged 28)	1.62 m	43	156	(Denmark) Team Tvis Holstebro
26	P	Louise Spellerberg	1 October 1982 (aged 29)	1.78 m	21	29	(Denmark) FC Midtjylland Håndbold
28	LB	Stine Jørgensen	3 September 1990 (aged 21)	1.80 m	8	6	(Denmark) Aalborg DH

=== Sweden ===
Head coach: Per Johansson

No.	Pos.	Name	Date of birth (age)	Height	App.	Goals	Club
2	P	Ulrika Ågren	13 July 1987 (aged 24)	1.76 m	10	9	(Denmark) Team Esbjerg
3	P	Tina Flognman	29 June 1981 (aged 30)	1.78 m	190	351	(France) Toulon St-Cyr Var Handball
4	LW	Matilda Boson	4 December 1981 (aged 29)	1.76 m	183	451	(Sweden) Spårvägens HF
5	RW	Hanna Fogelström	8 November 1990 (aged 21)	1.79 m	1	1	(Sweden) IK Sävehof
8	LB	Jamina Roberts	28 May 1990 (aged 21)	1.75 m	27	23	(Sweden) IK Sävehof
10	RW	Annika Fredén	21 August 1978 (aged 33)	1.76 m	95	278	(Sweden) BK Heid
12	GK	Gabriella Kain	25 March 1981 (aged 30)	1.79 m	60	0	(Denmark) KIF Kolding
15	LB	Johanna Ahlm	3 October 1987 (aged 24)	1.75 m	65	256	(Denmark) Viborg HK
16	GK	Cecilia Grubbström	2 September 1986 (aged 25)	1.78 m	44	1	(Sweden) IK Sävehof
17	CB	Linnea Torstensson	30 March 1983 (aged 28)	1.86 m	102	438	(Denmark) F.C. Midtjylland
18	P	Johanna Wiberg	6 September 1983 (aged 28)	1.84 m	104	71	(Sweden) Eslövs IK
20	CB	Isabelle Gulldén	29 June 1989 (aged 22)	1.79 m	75	203	(Denmark) Viborg HK
22	LW	Jessica Helleberg	20 February 1986 (aged 25)	1.72 m	28	94	(Denmark) Team Esbjerg
27	RB	Sabina Jacobsen	24 March 1989 (aged 22)	1.80 m	34	60	(Sweden) Lugi HF
29	LB	Jenny Alm	10 April 1989 (aged 22)	1.83 m	10	20	(Sweden) IK Sävehof
31	RB	Anna-Maria Johansson	15 February 1982 (aged 29)	1.84 m	23	65	(Sweden) Skövde HF

=== Uruguay ===
Head coach: Leonardo Puñales

No.	Pos.	Name	Date of birth (age)	Height	App.	Goals	Club
1	GK	Noelia Artigas	4 June 1989 (aged 22)	1.64 m			(Uruguay) Hebraica y Macabi
2	P	Eliana Falco	21 July 1987 (aged 24)	1.80 m			(Uruguay) Layva
3	LW	Soledad Faedo	17 December 1987 (aged 23)	1.70 m			(Uruguay) Layva
5	RB	Mercedes Saiz	12 September 1992 (aged 19)	1.73 m			(Uruguay) Malvin
6	LW	Mariana Gomez	11 July 1990 (aged 21)	1.60 m			(Uruguay) Scuola Italiana
8	LB	Ornella Palla	30 March 1990 (aged 21)	1.72 m			(Uruguay) Scuola Italiana
9	LB	Alesandra Ferrari	6 January 1987 (aged 24)	1.76 m			(Uruguay) Layva
10	RB	Mariana Fleitas	6 March 1981 (aged 30)	1.67 m			(Uruguay) Layva
11	RW	Paula Fynn	11 April 1988 (aged 23)	1.64 m			(Uruguay) Layva
12	GK	Rossina Soca	17 May 1988 (aged 23)	1.68 m			(Uruguay) Layva
13	CB	Jussara Castro	21 January 1982 (aged 29)	1.75 m			(Uruguay) Scuola Italiana
15	LB	Fernanda Marrochi	2 July 1988 (aged 23)	1.70 m			(Uruguay) Nautico
17	CB	Paula Basaistegui	14 November 1988 (aged 23)	1.61 m			(Uruguay) Layva
18	P	Joaquina Rosillo	11 August 1993 (aged 18)	1.75 m			(Uruguay) Malvin
19	LW	Sofia Cherone	21 May 1988 (aged 23)				(Uruguay) Scuola Italiana
20	RW	Viviana Ferrari	25 March 1992 (aged 19)	1.70 m			(Uruguay) Goes
