= Uruguay at the 2015 Pan American Games =

- IOC code: URU
- NOC: Uruguayan Olympic Committee
- Website: www.cou.org.uy

in Toronto, Canada 10–26 July 2015
- Competitors: 130 in 23 sports
- Flag bearer (opening): Dolores Moreira
- Flag bearer (closing): Fabricio Formiliano
- Medals: Gold 1 Silver 1 Bronze 3 Total 5

Pan American Games appearances (overview)
- 1951; 1955; 1959; 1963; 1967; 1971; 1975; 1979; 1983; 1987; 1991; 1995; 1999; 2003; 2007; 2011; 2015; 2019; 2023

Uruguay competed in the 2015 Pan American Games in Toronto, Canada from July 10 to 26, 2015.

Sailor Dolores Moreira was named the flagbearer of the country at the opening ceremony, after track and field athlete Déborah Rodríguez could not arrive on time to Toronto due to flight problems.

== Competitors ==
The following table lists Uruguay's delegation per sport and gender.

Sport	Men	Women	Total
Athletics	3	2	5
Beach volleyball	2	2	4
Canoeing	6	0	6
Cycling	2	0	2
Equestrian	8	0	8
Field hockey	0	16	16
Football (soccer)	18	0	18
Golf	1	2	3
Gymnastics	1	1	2
Handball	15	15	30
Judo	2	0	2
Karate	1	0	1
Modern pentathlon	1	1	2
Rowing	5	0	5
Rugby sevens	12	0	12
Sailing	1	1	2
Shooting	0	1	1
Swimming	1	1	2
Table tennis	0	1	1
Taekwondo	2	1	3
Tennis	3	0	3
Triathlon	1	0	0
Weightlifting	1	0	0
Total	86	44	130

== Medalists ==
Medal	Name	Sport	Event	Date
Gold	Uruguay national football team Guillermo de Amores; Sebastián Gorga; Federico Ricca; Mauricio Lemos; Andrés Schettino; Fabricio Formiliano; Facundo Ismael Castro; Juan Cruz Mascia; Junior Arias; Michael Santos; Ignacio González; Gastón Olveira; Erick Cabaco; Gastón Faber; Fernando Gorriarán; Nicolás Albarracín; Mathías Suárez; Brian Lozano	Football	Men's tournament	July 26
Silver	Dolores Moreira	Sailing	Laser Radial	July 18
Bronze	Déborah Rodríguez	Athletics	400 metres hurdles	July 22
Bronze	Emiliano Lasa	Athletics	long jump	July 22
Bronze	Uruguay women's national handball team Patricia Ré; Paola Santos; Paula Fynn; Soledad Faedo; Alejandra Scarrone; Daniela Scarrone; Alejandra Ferrari; Camila Barreiro; Martina Barreiro; Eliana Falco; Federica Cura; Leticia Schinca; Camila Vázquez; Viviana Ferrari; Iara Grosso	Handball	Women's tournament	July 24

== Athletics (track and field) ==
Uruguay qualified five track and field athletes (three men and two women).

Key

- Note–Ranks given for track events are for the entire round
- Q = Qualified for the next round
- q = Qualified for the next round as a fastest loser or, in field events, by position without achieving the qualifying target
- NR = National record
- GR = Games record
- SB = Seasonal best
- DNF = Did not finish
- NM = No mark
- N/A = Round not applicable for the event

Track & road events

Athlete	Event	Semifinals		Final	
Athlete	Event	Time	Rank	Time	Rank
Andrés Silva	Men's 400 m hurdles	50.02	3 q	49.48	7
Aguelmis Rojas	Men's marathon	—N/a		2:20:10 SB	7
Pia Fernández	Women's 1500 m	—N/a		4:27.17	11
Déborah Rodríguez	Women's 400 m hurdles	56.86	4 Q	56.41	3rd place, bronze medalist(s)

Field events

Athlete	Event	Qualification		Final	
Athlete	Event	Distance	Rank	Distance	Rank
Emiliano Lasa	Men's long jump	8.01	3 Q	8.17	3rd place, bronze medalist(s)

== Beach volleyball ==
Uruguay has qualified a men's and women's pair for a total of four athletes.

Athlete	Event	Preliminary Round			Quarterfinals	Semifinals	Finals	
Athlete	Event	Opposition Score	Opposition Score	Opposition Score	Opposition Score	Opposition Score	Opposition Score	Rank
Renzo Cairus; Mauricio Vieyto	Men's	García Betancourt - Recinos Ocaña (GUA)W; 2–0	Mora Romero - Lopez Alvarado (NIC)W; 2–0	Binstock - Schachter (CAN)L; 0–2	Araujo - Filho (BRA)W; 0–2	5th to 8th Round: Rodríguez - Haddock (PUR)W; 2–0	5th to 6th Round: Capogrosso - Mehamed (ARG)W; 2–0	5
Fabiana Gomez; Ma. Eugenia Nieto	Women's							

== Canoeing ==
=== Sprint ===
Uruguay has qualified 6 athletes in the sprint discipline (all 6 in men's kayak).

Men

Athlete	Event	Heats		Semifinals		Final	
Athlete	Event	Time	Rank	Time	Rank	Time	Rank
Sebastian Romero	K-1 200 m	39.109	5 QS	39.542	2 QF	38.369	8
Sebastian Romero	K-1 1000 m	—N/a				3:54.601	6
Mauro de Sosa; Edgardo Brum	K-2 200 m	—N/a				39.276	7
Julian Cabrera; Matias Otero	K-2 1000 m	—N/a				3:34.066	6
Julian Cabrera; Matias Otero; Sebastian Delgado; Sebastian Romero	K-4 1000 m	—N/a				3:11.176	6

Qualification Legend: QF = Qualify to final; QS = Qualify to semifinal

== Cycling ==
=== Mountain biking ===
Uruguay has qualified two male cyclists.

Athlete	Event	Time	Rank
Andres Gelpes	Cross-country	LAP	
Kian Santana	Cross-country	LAP	

== Equestrian ==
Uruguay qualified eight equestrians across all three disciplines.

== Field hockey ==
Women's tournament

Uruguay announced their squad on July 7, 2015.

- Constanza Barrandeguy
- Cecilia Casarotti
- Mercedes Coates
- Kaisuami Dallorso
- Federika Kempner
- Matilde Kliche
- Lucía Laborde
- Lucía Lamberti
- Sofía Mora
- Agustina Nieto
- Florencia Norbis
- Anastasia Olave
- Rossana Paselle
- Janine Stanley
- Manuela Vilar del Valle
- Soledad Villar

Pool B

Pos	Team	Pld	W	D	L	GF	GA	GD	Pts	Qualification
1	United States	3	3	0	0	19	0	+19	9	Quarterfinals
2	Chile	3	2	0	1	10	4	+6	6	Quarterfinals
3	Uruguay	3	1	0	2	3	10	−7	3	Quarterfinals
4	Cuba	3	0	0	3	4	22	−18	0	Quarterfinals

Source: FIH
Rules for classification: 1) points; 2) goal difference; 3) goals scored; 4) head-to-head result.

13 July 2015
11:00

United States	5–0	Uruguay
K. Reinprecht 2'; Kasold 18'; Vittese 28'; Falgowski 36'; Kolojejchick 56'	Report

Umpires:
Soledad Iparraguirre (ARG)
Camila Cabargas (CHI)

15 July 2015
11:00

Uruguay	3–2	Cuba
Barrandeguy 10'; Vilar del Valle 29'; Olave Solari 47'	Report	Vera 22'; Paso 32'

Umpires:
Stephanie Judefind (USA)
Suzi Sutton (USA)

17 July 2015
11:00

Uruguay	0–3	Chile
	Report	García 6'; Urroz 7'; C. Caram 49'

Umpires:
Megan Robertson (CAN)
Soledad Iparraguirre (ARG)

Quarterfinal

20 July 2015
19:30

Canada	2–0	Uruguay
Raye 37'; Johansen 50'	Report

Umpires:
Michelle Joubert (RSA)
Camila Cabargas (CHI)

Classification semifinal

22 July 2015
11:30

Uruguay	7–1	Dominican Republic
Norbis 13', 20'; Casarotti 31'; Coates 36'; Vilar del Valle 48', 50'; Stanley 49'	Report	Ortega Mateo 17'

Umpires:
Stephanie Judefind (USA)
Megan Robertson (CAN)

Fifth place match

24 July 2015
11:30

Mexico	1–1	Uruguay
Marlet Correa 24'	Report	Casarotti 44'
Penalties
Orozco (penalty shoot-out missed); María Correa (penalty shoot-out missed); Marlet Correa (penalty shoot-out scored); Oviedo (penalty shoot-out scored); Navarro (penalty shoot-out missed)	2–3	Vilar del Valle (penalty shoot-out scored); Norbis (penalty shoot-out scored); Lamberti (penalty shoot-out scored); Villar (penalty shoot-out missed)

Umpires:
Meghan McLennan (CAN)
Megan Robertson (CAN)

2015 Pan American Games 5th

Uruguay

== Football ==
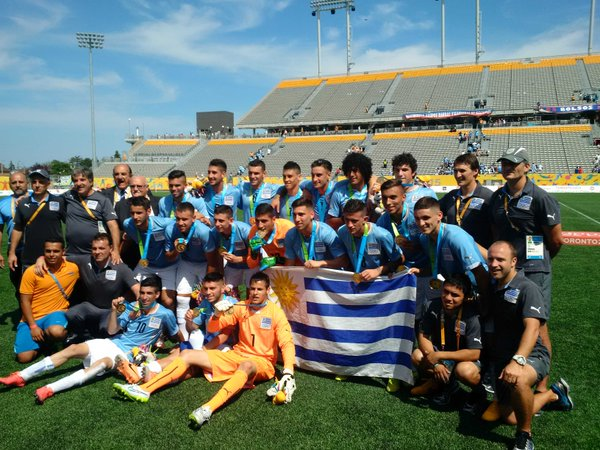
Uruguay's gold medal men's soccer team at the 2015 Pan American Games

Men's tournament

Uruguay has qualified a men's team of 18 athletes.

Roster

The roster for Uruguay was as follows.

Head coach: Fabián Coito

No.	Pos.	Player	Date of birth (age)	Club
1	GK	Guillermo de Amores	October 19, 1994 (aged 20)	(Uruguayan Football Association) Liverpool
2	DF	Sebastián Gorga	April 6, 1994 (aged 21)	(Uruguayan Football Association) Nacional
3	DF	Federico Ricca	December 1, 1994 (aged 20)	(Uruguayan Football Association) Danubio
4	DF	Mauricio Lemos	December 28, 1995 (aged 19)	(Uruguayan Football Association) Defensor Sporting
5	MF	Andrés Schettino	May 26, 1994 (aged 21)	(Uruguayan Football Association) Fenix
6	DF	Fabricio Formiliano	January 13, 1993 (aged 22)	(Uruguayan Football Association) Danubio
7	MF	Facundo Castro	February 22, 1995 (aged 20)	(Uruguayan Football Association) Defensor Sporting
8	FW	Juan Cruz Mascia	January 3, 1994 (aged 21)	(Uruguayan Football Association) Nacional
9	FW	Junior Arias	May 17, 1993 (aged 22)	(Uruguayan Football Association) Liverpool
10	FW	Michael Santos	March 13, 1993 (aged 22)	(Uruguayan Football Association) River Plate
11	MF	Ignacio González	November 5, 1993 (aged 21)	(Uruguayan Football Association) Danubio
12	GK	Gastón Olveira	April 21, 1993 (aged 22)	(Uruguayan Football Association) River Plate
13	DF	Erick Cabaco	April 19, 1995 (aged 20)	(Uruguayan Football Association) Rentistas
14	MF	Gastón Faber	April 21, 1996 (aged 19)	(Uruguayan Football Association) Danubio
15	DF	Fernando Gorriarán	November 27, 1994 (aged 20)	(Uruguayan Football Association) River Plate
16	FW	Nicolás Albarracín	June 11, 1993 (aged 22)	(Uruguayan Football Association) Montevideo Wanderers
17	DF	Mathías Suárez	June 24, 1996 (aged 19)	(Uruguayan Football Association) Defensor Sporting
18	FW	Brian Lozano	February 23, 1994 (aged 21)	(Uruguayan Football Association) Defensor Sporting

Group B

Pos	Team	Pld	W	D	L	GF	GA	GD	Pts	Qualification
1	Mexico	3	2	1	0	6	3	+3	7	Medal round
2	Uruguay	3	2	0	1	5	1	+4	6	Medal round
3	Paraguay	3	1	1	1	6	3	+3	4	
4	Trinidad and Tobago	3	0	0	3	3	13	−10	0	

Source: Toronto 2015
July 13, 2015
17:35

Trinidad and Tobago	0–4	Uruguay
	Report	Formiliano 6'; Ricca 20'; Albarracín 31'; Lozano 69'

Hamilton Pan Am Soccer Stadium, Hamilton
Referee: Oscar Reyna (Guatemala)

July 17, 2015
17:35

Mexico	1–0	Uruguay
Silva 90+1'	Report

Hamilton Pan Am Soccer Stadium, Hamilton
Referee: Marcos Brea (Cuba)

July 21, 2015
20:35

Uruguay	1–0	Paraguay
Gorriarán 52'	Report

Hamilton Pan Am Soccer Stadium, Hamilton
Referee: Oscar Reyna (Guatemala)

Semifinals

July 23, 2015
17:35

Brazil	1–2	Uruguay
Clayton 75'	Report	Schettino 86'; Santos 87'

Hamilton Pan Am Soccer Stadium, Hamilton
Referee: José Peñaloza (Mexico)

Gold medal match

July 26, 2015
13:05

(gold) Uruguay	1–0	Mexico (silver)
Lozano 11'	Report

Hamilton Pan Am Soccer Stadium, Hamilton
Referee: Óscar Reyna (Guatemala)

== Golf ==
Uruguay qualified a team of three golfers (one man and two women).

Athlete(s)	Event	Final					
Athlete(s)	Event	Round 1	Round 2	Round 3	Round 4	Total	Rank
Juan Álvarez	Men's individual	82	73	68	71	294 (+6)	16
Manuela Barros	Women's individual	87	92	85	79	343 (+55)	29
Priscilla Schmid	Women's individual	79	87	80	84	330 (+42)	=26
Juan Álvarez; Manuela Barros; Priscilla Schmid	Mixed team	161	160	148	150	619 (+43)	16

== Gymnastics ==
Artistic

Uruguay qualified 2 athletes.

Men
Individual Qualification

Cristhian Meneses

Women
Individual Qualification

Debora Reis

== Handball ==
Uruguay has qualified a men's and women's team. Each team will consist of 15 athletes, for a total of 30.

=== Men's tournament ===
Uruguay announced their squad on July 6, 2015.

Head coach: (Uruguay) Jorge Botejara

No.	Pos.	Name	Date of birth (age)	Height	App.	Goals	Club
1	GK	Manuel Adler	14 July 1992 (age 34)	1.74 m			(Uruguay) Scuola
3	RW	Matías Gamiz	15 November 1985 (age 40)	1.80 m			(Uruguay) Scuola
4	P	Gaston Rudich	16 November 1981 (age 44)	1.87 m			(Argentina) Alemán
7	RB	Sebastián Abdala	20 November 1988 (age 37)	1.90 m			(Italy) Scuola
8	LB	Alejandro Velazco	24 October 1993 (age 32)	1.85 m			(Spain) Scuola
9	CB	Nicolás Fabra	5 January 1986 (age 40)	1.82 m			(Uruguay) Scuola
10	RB	Gabriel Spangenberg	4 April 1986 (age 40)	1.84 m			(Uruguay) Alemán
11	LW	Federico Rubbo	5 April 1989 (age 37)	1.85 m			(Uruguay) Scuola
14	CB	Gonzalo Gamba	23 July 1982 (age 44)	1.84 m			(Uruguay) Alemán
15	P	Bruno Méndez	30 October 1994 (age 31)	1.90 m			(Uruguay) Bohemios
16	GK	Felipe González	8 December 1993 (age 32)	1.90 m			(Uruguay) Alemán
17	LB	Diego Morandeira	2 April 1993 (age 33)	1.88 m			(Uruguay) Alemán
19	CB	Rodrigo Botejara	28 January 1993 (age 33)	1.74 m			(Uruguay) Scuola
22	LB	Facundo Liston	7 January 1993 (age 33)	1.94 m			(Uruguay) Scuola
23	LB	Maximo Cancio	24 February 1984 (age 42)	1.88 m			(Spain) Scuola

Group A

Team	Pld	W	D	L	GF	GA	GD	Pts	Qualification
Brazil	3	3	0	0	120	53	+67	6	Qualified for the semifinals
Uruguay	3	2	0	1	77	78	−1	4	Qualified for the semifinals
Canada	3	1	0	2	62	85	−23	2	
Dominican Republic	3	0	0	3	66	109	−43	0	

July 17; 13:30	Dominican Republic	23–33	Uruguay	Exhibition Centre – Hall B Referees: Gjeding, Hansen (DEN)
July 17; 13:30	Mateo 6	(12–13)	Fabra 5	Exhibition Centre – Hall B Referees: Gjeding, Hansen (DEN)
July 17; 13:30	2× (yellow card) 8× (suspension)	report	2× (yellow card) 4× (suspension)	Exhibition Centre – Hall B Referees: Gjeding, Hansen (DEN)

July 19; 11:30	Uruguay	18–38	Brazil	Exhibition Centre – Hall B Referees: Guzman, Perez (PUR)
July 19; 11:30	Morandeira 5	(11–16)	Pozzer, Chiuffa 5	Exhibition Centre – Hall B Referees: Guzman, Perez (PUR)
July 19; 11:30	3× (yellow card) 2× (suspension)	report	2× (yellow card) 2× (suspension)	Exhibition Centre – Hall B Referees: Guzman, Perez (PUR)

July 21; 11:30	Canada	17–26	Uruguay	Exhibition Centre – Hall B Referees: Gjeding, Hansen (DEN)
July 21; 11:30	Sartisson 4	(7–13)	Mendez 7	Exhibition Centre – Hall B Referees: Gjeding, Hansen (DEN)
July 21; 11:30	1× (yellow card) 4× (suspension)	Report	4× (yellow card) 3× (suspension)	Exhibition Centre – Hall B Referees: Gjeding, Hansen (DEN)

Semifinals

July 23; 20:30	Uruguay	12–20	Argentina	Exhibition Centre – Hall B Referees: Zuñiga, Reyes (CUB)
July 23; 20:30	Gamiz 3	(7–7)	Simonet 10	Exhibition Centre – Hall B Referees: Zuñiga, Reyes (CUB)
July 23; 20:30	2× (yellow card) 6× (suspension)	report	3× (yellow card) 3× (suspension)	Exhibition Centre – Hall B Referees: Zuñiga, Reyes (CUB)

Bronze medal match

July 25; 17:30	(bronze) Chile	23–17	Uruguay	Exhibition Centre – Hall B Referees: Minore, Marina (ARG)
July 25; 17:30	Salinas 6	(10–9)	Fabra 4	Exhibition Centre – Hall B Referees: Minore, Marina (ARG)
July 25; 17:30	2× (yellow card) 2× (suspension)	report	2× (yellow card) 4× (suspension)	Exhibition Centre – Hall B Referees: Minore, Marina (ARG)

=== Women's tournament ===
Uruguay announced their squad on July 6, 2015.

- Patricia Ré
- Paola Santos
- Paula Fynn
- Soledad Faedo
- Alejandra Scarrone
- Daniela Scarrone
- Alejandra Ferrari
- Camila Barreiro
- Martina Barreiro
- Eliana Falco
- Federica Cura
- Leticia Schinca
- Camila Vázquez
- Viviana Ferrari
- Iara Grosso

Group B

Team	Pld	W	D	L	GF	GA	GD	Pts	Qualification
Argentina	3	2	0	1	75	60	+15	4	Qualified for the Semifinals
Uruguay	3	2	0	1	80	74	+6	4	Qualified for the Semifinals
Cuba	3	2	0	1	83	83	0	4	
Chile	3	0	0	3	69	90	−21	0	

July 16; 18:30	Argentina	20–15	Uruguay	Exhibition Centre – Hall B Referees: Pinto, Menezes (BRA)
July 16; 18:30	Mendoza 6	(13–7)	Barreiro 9	Exhibition Centre – Hall B Referees: Pinto, Menezes (BRA)
July 16; 18:30	3× (yellow card) 2× (suspension)	report	3× (yellow card) 5× (suspension)	Exhibition Centre – Hall B Referees: Pinto, Menezes (BRA)

July 18; 20:30	Uruguay	32–26	Chile	Exhibition Centre – Hall B Referees: Ines Paolantoni, Florencia Zanikian (ARG)
July 18; 20:30	three players 5	(15–10)	Flores 5	Exhibition Centre – Hall B Referees: Ines Paolantoni, Florencia Zanikian (ARG)
July 18; 20:30	3× (yellow card) 4× (suspension)	Report	2× (yellow card) 7× (suspension)	Exhibition Centre – Hall B Referees: Ines Paolantoni, Florencia Zanikian (ARG)

July 20; 18:30	Uruguay	33–28	Cuba	Exhibition Centre – Hall B Referees: Minore, Marina (ARG)
July 20; 18:30	Barreiro 10	(13–12)	Lusson 9	Exhibition Centre – Hall B Referees: Minore, Marina (ARG)
July 20; 18:30	4× (yellow card) 4× (suspension)	report	2× (yellow card) 5× (suspension)	Exhibition Centre – Hall B Referees: Minore, Marina (ARG)

Semifinals

July 22; 13:30	Brazil	40–22	Uruguay	Exhibition Centre – Hall B Referees: Guzman, Perez (PUR)
July 22; 13:30	Silva 8	(18–11)	Scarrone 8	Exhibition Centre – Hall B Referees: Guzman, Perez (PUR)
July 22; 13:30	3× (yellow card) 5× (suspension)	report	3× (yellow card) 2× (suspension)	Exhibition Centre – Hall B Referees: Guzman, Perez (PUR)

Bronze medal match

July 24; 17:30	(bronze) Uruguay	29–21	Mexico	Exhibition Centre – Hall B Referees: Zuñiga, Reyes (CUB)
July 24; 17:30	Barreiro 11	(11–8)	Saavedra 7	Exhibition Centre – Hall B Referees: Zuñiga, Reyes (CUB)
July 24; 17:30	3× (yellow card) 2× (suspension)	Report	2× (yellow card) 6× (suspension)	Exhibition Centre – Hall B Referees: Zuñiga, Reyes (CUB)

== Judo ==
Uruguay qualified two male judokas.

Men

Athlete	Event	Round of 16	Quarterfinals	Semifinals	Repechage	Final / BM	
Athlete	Event	Opposition Result	Opposition Result	Opposition Result	Opposition Result	Opposition Result	Rank
Juan Romero	90 kg	Bye	Cristian Schmidt (ARG); L 000–101	Did not advance	Rafael Romo (CHI); L 000S2–010S1	Did not advance	=7
Manuel Bueno	100 kg	Christopher George (TRI); W 100–000	Jose Armenteros (CUB); L 000S4–100S1	Did not advance	Ajax Tadehara (USA); W 101S1–000	Héctor Campos (ARG); L 000S1–100	=5

== Karate ==
Uruguay has qualified 1 male karateka.

Athlete	Event	Round Robin				Semifinals	Final	
Athlete	Event	Opposition Result	Opposition Result	Opposition Result	Rank	Opposition Result	Opposition Result	Rank
Maximiliano Larrosa	Men's –60 kg	Douglas Brose (BRA); L 0–8	Andrés Rendón (COL); L 0–2	Miguel Soffia (CHI); L 0–3	4	Did not advance		8

== Modern pentathlon ==
Uruguay has qualified two athletes (one man and one woman).

Athlete	Event	Fencing (Épée One Touch)			Swimming (200m Freestyle)			Riding (Show Jumping)			Shooting/Running (10 m Air Pistol/3000m)			Total Points	Final Rank
Athlete	Event	Results	Rank	MP points	Time	Rank	MP points	Penalties	Rank	MP points	Time	Rank	MP points	Total Points	Final Rank
Luis Siri	Men's	9	=24	162	2:30.29	=25	250	28	=13	272	15:19.03	26	381	1065	23
Yoselin Pedragosa	Women's	2	22	133	2:52.04	22	184	DNS	=21	0	16:49.94	21	291	608	22

== Rowing ==
Uruguay has qualified three boats and five male rowers.

Men

Athlete	Event	Heats		Repechage		Final	
Athlete	Event	Time	Rank	Time	Rank	Time	Rank
Montes Esquivel	Single sculls	7.40.34	5 R	7.45.83	3 FB	8:21.08	9
Emiliano Dumestre; Mauricio Lopez	Double sculls	6:52.38	4 R	7:00.58	3 FB	6:43.35	7
Bruno Cetraro; Rodolfo Collazo	Lwt double dculls	6:54.62	3 R	6:57.63	2 FA	6:32.21	6

Qualification Legend: FA=Final A (medal); FB=Final B (non-medal); R=Repechage

== Rugby sevens ==
Uruguay has qualified a men's team of 12 athletes.

=== Men's tournament ===
Roster

Uruguay announced their squad on early July, 2015.

- Gabriel Puig (C)
- Juan Diego Ormaechea
- Nicolas Freitas
- Lucas Puig
- Federico Favaro
- Tomas Etcheverry
- Alfonso Falcón
- Rodrigo Silva
- Santiago Martinez
- Gastón Gibernau
- Ian Schmidt
- Sebastián Schroeder

Group A

Team	Pld	W	D	L	PF	PA	PD	Pts	Qualification
United States	3	3	0	0	126	7	+119	9	Qualified for the quarterfinals
Uruguay	3	2	0	1	54	69	−15	7	Qualified for the quarterfinals
Chile	3	1	0	2	62	46	+16	5	Qualified for the quarterfinals
Mexico	3	0	0	3	0	120	−120	3	Qualified for the quarterfinals

11 July 2015
11:33

Uruguay	34–0	Mexico
	Report

Exhibition Stadium, Toronto

11 July 2015
16:27

Uruguay	20–17	Chile
	Report

Exhibition Stadium, Toronto

11 July 2015
19:11

United States	52–0	Uruguay
	Report

Exhibition Stadium, Toronto

Quarterfinals

12 July 2015
11:55

Uruguay	12–5	Brazil
	Report

Exhibition Stadium, Toronto

Semifinals

12 July 2015
17:11

Uruguay	7–43	Argentina
	Report

Exhibition Stadium, Toronto

Bronze medal match

12 July 2015
19:34

(bronze) United States	40–12	Uruguay
	Report

Exhibition Stadium, Toronto

== Sailing ==
Uruguay qualified 2 boats.

== Shooting ==
Uruguay qualified 1 female shooter. Diana Cabrera was a Canadian born shooter who competed in her hometown at the games for the country of her parents birth.

Women

Athlete	Event	Qualification		Final	
Athlete	Event	Points	Rank	Points	Rank
Diana Cabrera	10 metre air rifle	400.7	21	Did not advance	
Diana Cabrera	50 metre rifle three positions	556-13x	21	Did not advance	

== Swimming ==
Uruguay qualified two swimmers (one male and one female).

Key

- Note – Ranks given are for the entire round
- FB = Qualified for the B Final

Athlete	Event	Heat		Final	
Athlete	Event	Time	Rank	Time	Rank
Martin Melconian	Men's 100 m breaststroke	1:04.26	16 FB	1:04.95	16
Inés Remersaro	Women's 100 m freestyle	58.81	21	Did not advance	
Inés Remersaro	Women's 100 m backstroke	1:05.21	17 FB	1:05.78	16
Inés Remersaro	Women's 200 m backstroke	2:21.33	16 FB	2:21.33	16

== Table tennis ==
Uruguay has qualified one woman.

Women

Athlete	Event	Group stage				Round of 32	Round of 16	Quarterfinals	Semifinals	Final / BM	
Athlete	Event	Opposition Result	Opposition Result	Opposition Result	Rank	Opposition Result	Opposition Result	Opposition Result	Opposition Result	Opposition Result	Rank
Maria Lorenzotti	Singles	Serrano (MEX); W 4–0	Ruano (COL); L 3–4	Enriquez (GUA); W 4–2	2 Q	Bye	Wu (USA); L 1–4	Did not advance			=9

== Taekwondo ==
Uruguay has qualified a team of two male athletes. It further received a female wildcard spot.

Athlete	Event	Round of 16	Quarterfinals	Semifinals	Repechage	Bronze medal	Final	
Athlete	Event	Opposition Result	Opposition Result	Opposition Result	Opposition Result	Opposition Result	Opposition Result	Rank
Federico González	Men's 68 kg	Henrique Precioso (BRA); L 1–4	Did not advance					
Braian Elliot	Men's +80 kg	Douglas Townsend (ISV); W 11–2	Misael Lopez (MEX); L 2–3	Did not advance				
Danna Poggio	Women's 57 kg	Josiane De Oliveira (BRA); L DSQ	Did not advance					

== Tennis ==
Uruguay qualified three male athletes.

Men

Athlete	Event	1st Round	Round of 32	Round of 16	Quarterfinals	Semifinals	Bronze medal/Final	
Athlete	Event	Opposition Score	Opposition Score	Opposition Score	Opposition Score	Opposition Score	Opposition Score	Rank
Rodrigo Arús	Singles	Williams (BAR); W (7–6 ^{7–4}, 7–6 ^{7–1})	Lapentti (ECU); L (3–6, 1–6)	Did not advance				
Ariel Behar	Singles	J Menezes (BRA); L (3–6, 6–7 ^{2–7})	Did not advance					
Rodrigo Senattore	Singles	Bye	Gómez (ECU); L (3–6, 2–6)	Did not advance				
Rodrigo Arús; Ariel Behar	Doubles	—N/a		Dorantes / Hernández (CUB); W (6–3, 6–2)	Andreozzi / Bagnis (ARG); L (2–6, 1–6)	Did not advance		

== Triathlon ==
Uruguay qualified one male triathlete.

Men

Athlete	Event	Swim (1.5 km)	Trans 1	Bike (40 km)	Trans 2	Run (10 km)	Total	Rank
Martin Oliver	Individual	19:43	0:27	1:21:36	0:21	35:31	1:57:29	26

== Weightlifting ==
Uruguay has qualified one man.

Men

Athlete	Event	Snatch		Clean & jerk		Total	Rank
Athlete	Event	Result	Rank	Result	Rank	Total	Rank
Emanuel Coto	Men's +105 kg	146	5	167	5	313	5

== See also ==
- Uruguay at the 2016 Summer Olympics
