= Aimone =

Male given name

Aimone is a given name, often derived from Haimo, and also a surname. Notable people with the name include:

== As a given name ==
- Aimone Alletti (born 1988), Italian volleyball player
- Prince Aimone, Duke of Aosta (1900–1948), Italian prince, officer of the Royal Italian Navy
- Aimone di Savoia Aosta (born 1967), first son of Prince Amedeo, 5th Duke of Aosta
- Aimone Calì (born 1997), Italian footballer
- Aimone Duce, Italian painter for the court of Savoy-Acaia, active during 1417 and 1444
- Aimone Taparelli (1395–1495), Italian Roman Catholic priest, professed member from the Order of Preachers

== As a surname ==
- Florencia Aimone (born 1990), Argentine handball player

== See also ==
- Amon (disambiguation)
- Eamonn (given name)
