= Beach volleyball at the 2015 Pan American Games – Men's tournament =

Beach volleyball – Men's tournament at the 2015 Pan American Games
- Venue: Chevrolet Beach Volleyball Centre
- Dates: July 13–21, 2015
- Competitors: 32 from 16 nations

Medalists
Gold medal	Rodolfo Ontiveros; Juan Virgen	Mexico
Silver medal	Vitor Araujo; Álvaro Morais Filho	Brazil
Bronze medal	Nivaldo Díaz; Sergio González	Cuba

The men's tournament competition of the beach volleyball events at the 2015 Pan American Games took place between July 13 and 21, 2015 at the Chevrolet Beach Volleyball Centre. The defending Pan American Games champions were Alison Cerutti and Emanuel Rego of Brazil.

Each of the 16 pairs in the tournament will be placed in one of four groups of four teams apiece, and play a round-robin within that pool. The top two teams in each pool advance to the Quarterfinals. The third along with the fourth-placed teams in each group, will be eliminated.

The 8 teams that advanced to the elimination rounds will play a single-elimination tournament with a bronze-medal match between the semifinal losers.

== Schedule ==
Date	Start	Finish	Phase
Monday July 13, 2015	9:00	23:00	Preliminaries
Tuesday July 14, 2015	9:00	23:00	Preliminaries
Wednesday July 15, 2015	9:00	23:00	Preliminaries
Thursday July 16, 2015	9:00	23:00	Preliminaries
Friday July 17, 2015	9:00	23:30	Elimination stage/Quarterfinal qualifiers
Saturday July 18, 2015	9:00	23:30	Quarterfinals
Sunday July 19, 2015	9:00	21:00	Semifinals
Monday July 20, 2015	9:00	21:00	Placement matches
Tuesday July 21, 2015	9:00	21:00	Gold/Bronze-medal matches

== Results ==
=== Preliminary round ===
All times are Central Standard Time (UTC−06:00)

==== Group A ====
Pos	Team	Pld	W	L	Pts	SW	SL	SR	SPW	SPL	SPR	Qualification
1	Binstock – Schachter (CAN)	3	3	0	6	6	1	6.000	136	94	1.447	Quarterfinals
2	Cairus – Vieyto (URU)	3	2	1	5	4	2	2.000	115	101	1.139	Elimination round
3	Mora Romero – Lopez Alvarado (NIC)	3	1	2	4	3	5	0.600	126	139	0.906	Elimination round
4	García Betancourt – Recinos Ocaña (GUA)	3	0	3	3	1	6	0.167	94	137	0.686	13th to 16th round

Date		Score		Set 1	Set 2	Set 3	Report
July 14	Cairus – Vieyto (URU)	2–0	García Betancourt – Recinos Ocaña (GUA)	21–15	21–16		
July 14	Binstock – Schachter (CAN)	2–1	Mora Romero – Lopez Alvarado (NIC)	21–14	16–21	15–10	
July 15	Binstock – Schachter (CAN)	2–0	García Betancourt – Recinos Ocaña (GUA)	21–9	21–9		
July 15	Cairus – Vieyto (URU)	2–0	Mora Romero – Lopez Alvarado (NIC)	21–14	21–14		
July 16	García Betancourt – Recinos Ocaña (GUA)	1–2	Mora Romero – Lopez Alvarado (NIC)	17–21	21–17	7–15	
July 16	Binstock – Schachter (CAN)	2–0	Cairus – Vieyto (URU)	21–12	21–19		

==== Group B ====
Pos	Team	Pld	W	L	Pts	SW	SL	SR	SPW	SPL	SPR	Qualification
1	Araujo – Filho (BRA)	3	3	0	6	6	1	6.000	150	114	1.316	Quarterfinals
2	Ontiveros – Virgen (MEX)	3	2	1	5	4	2	2.000	129	106	1.217	Elimination round
3	Henríquez – Villafañe (VEN)	3	1	2	4	3	4	0.750	121	123	0.984	Elimination round
4	Daniel – de Cuba (ARU)	3	0	3	3	0	6	0.000	69	126	0.548	13th to 16th round

Date		Score		Set 1	Set 2	Set 3	Report
July 13	Araujo – Filho (BRA)	2–0	Daniel – de Cuba (ARU)	21–10	21–13		
July 13	Ontiveros – Virgen (MEX)	2–0	Henríquez – Villafañe (VEN)	21–15	21–18		
July 14	Araujo – Filho (BRA)	2–1	Henríquez – Villafañe (VEN)	21–15	18–21	15–10	
July 14	Ontiveros – Virgen (MEX)	2–0	Daniel – de Cuba (ARU)	21–10	21–9		
July 15	Araujo – Filho (BRA)	2–0	Ontiveros – Virgen (MEX)	21–14	33–31		
July 15	Henríquez – Villafañe (VEN)	2–0	Daniel – de Cuba (ARU)	21–14	21–13		

==== Group C ====
Pos	Team	Pld	W	L	Pts	SW	SL	SR	SPW	SPL	SPR	Qualification
1	Díaz – González (CUB)	3	3	0	6	6	0	MAX	126	88	1.432	Quarterfinals
2	Capogrosso – Mehamed (ARG)	3	2	1	5	4	2	2.000	115	96	1.198	Elimination round
3	Evans – Satterfield (USA)	3	1	2	4	2	4	0.500	94	113	0.832	Elimination round
4	Bissette – Clercent (LCA)	3	0	3	3	0	6	0.000	88	126	0.698	13th to 16th round

Date		Score		Set 1	Set 2	Set 3	Report
July 13	Capogrosso – Mehamed (ARG)	0–2	Díaz – González (CUB)	19–21	12–21		
July 13	Evans – Satterfield (USA)	2–0	Bissette – Clercent (LCA)	21–18	21–11		
July 14	Evans – Satterfield (USA)	0–2	Díaz – González (CUB)	17–21	15–21		
July 14	Capogrosso – Mehamed (ARG)	2–0	Bissette – Clercent (LCA)	21–17	21–17		
July 16	Evans – Satterfield (USA)	0–2	Capogrosso – Mehamed (ARG)	9–21	11–21		
July 16	Díaz – González (CUB)	2–0	Bissette – Clercent (LCA)	21–13	21–12		

==== Group D ====
Pos	Team	Pld	W	L	Pts	SW	SL	SR	SPW	SPL	SPR	Qualification
1	E Grimalt – M Grimalt (CHI)	3	3	0	6	6	0	MAX	127	84	1.512	Quarterfinals
2	Rodríguez – Haddock (PUR)	3	2	1	5	4	2	2.000	114	99	1.152	Elimination round
3	Williams – Withfield (TRI)	3	1	2	4	2	4	0.500	105	124	0.847	Elimination round
4	Talavera – Vargas (ESA)	3	0	3	3	0	6	0.000	92	131	0.702	13th to 16th round

Date		Score		Set 1	Set 2	Set 3	Report
July 13	E Grimalt – M Grimalt (CHI)	2–0	Talavera – Vargas (ESA)	21–11	21–12		
July 13	Rodríguez – Haddock (PUR)	2–0	Williams – Withfield (TRI)	21–12	21–15		
July 15	E Grimalt – M Grimalt (CHI)	2–0	Williams – Withfield (TRI)	21–11	22–20		
July 15	Rodríguez – Haddock (PUR)	2–0	Talavera – Vargas (ESA)	21–15	21–15		
July 16	E Grimalt – M Grimalt (CHI)	2–0	Rodríguez – Haddock (PUR)	21–19	21–11		
July 16	Williams – Withfield (TRI)	2–0	Talavera – Vargas (ESA)	21–15	26–24		

=== Elimination stage ===
==== 13th to 16th round ====
Date		Score		Set 1	Set 2	Set 3	Report
July 17	García Betancourt – Recinos Ocaña (GUA)	1–2	Talavera – Vargas (ESA)	18–21	21–14	19–21	
July 17	Daniel – de Cuba (ARU)	1–2	Bissette – Clercent (LCA)	21–18	18–21	17–19	

==== Elimination round ====
Date		Score		Set 1	Set 2	Set 3	Report
July 17	Ontiveros – Virgen (MEX)	2–0	Williams – Withfield (TRI)	21–16	21–9		
July 17	Capogrosso – Mehamed (ARG)	2–0	Mora Romero – Lopez Alvarado (NIC)	21–15	21–15		
July 17	Cairus – Vieyto (URU)	2–0	Evans – Satterfield (USA)	21–15	21–18		
July 17	Rodríguez – Haddock (PUR)	2–1	Henríquez – Villafañe (VEN)	19–21	21–19	15–13	

==== 9th to 12th round ====
Date		Score		Set 1	Set 2	Set 3	Report
July 18	Williams – Withfield (TRI)	2–1	Mora Romero – Lopez Alvarado (NIC)	23–21	17–21	15–13	
July 18	Henríquez – Villafañe (VEN)	2–0	Evans – Satterfield (USA)	21–14	21–19		

==== Quarterfinals ====
Date		Score		Set 1	Set 2	Set 3	Report
July 18	Araujo – Filho (BRA)	2–0	Cairus – Vieyto (URU)	21–13	21–12		
July 18	Binstock – Schachter (CAN)	0–2	Ontiveros – Virgen (MEX)	19–21	24–26		
July 18	E Grimalt – M Grimalt (CHI)	2–0	Capogrosso – Mehamed (ARG)	21–18	21–12		
July 18	Díaz – González (CUB)	2–1	Rodríguez – Haddock (PUR)	23–25	21–13	15–9	

==== Semifinals ====
Date		Score		Set 1	Set 2	Set 3	Report
July 19	Díaz – González (CUB)	0–2	Araujo – Filho (BRA)	17–21	15–21		
July 19	Ontiveros – Virgen (MEX)	2–0	E Grimalt – M Grimalt (CHI)	21–18	21–13		

==== 5th to 8th round ====
Date		Score		Set 1	Set 2	Set 3	Report
July 20	Rodríguez – Haddock (PUR)	0–2	Cairus – Vieyto (URU)	14–21	12–21		
July 20	Binstock – Schachter (CAN)	0–2	Capogrosso – Mehamed (ARG)	0–21	0–21	DNS	

=== Finals ===
==== 15th to 16th round ====
Date		Score		Set 1	Set 2	Set 3	Report
July 19	García Betancourt – Recinos Ocaña (GUA)	0–2	Daniel – de Cuba (ARU)	18–21	18–21		

==== 13th to 14th round ====
Date		Score		Set 1	Set 2	Set 3	Report
July 19	Talavera – Vargas (ESA)	2–1	Bissette – Clercent (LCA)	22-20	17-21	15-10	

==== 11th to 12th round ====
Date		Score		Set 1	Set 2	Set 3	Report
July 20	Mora Romero – Lopez Alvarado (NIC)	0–2	Evans – Satterfield (USA)	16-21	28-30		

==== 9th to 10th round ====
Date		Score		Set 1	Set 2	Set 3	Report
July 20	Williams – Withfield (TRI)	2–0	Henríquez – Villafañe (VEN)	21-0	21-0	DNS	

==== 7th to 8th round ====
Date		Score		Set 1	Set 2	Set 3	Report
July 21	Binstock – Schachter (CAN)	0–2	Rodríguez – Haddock (PUR)	0-21	0-21	DNS	

==== 5th to 6th round ====
Date		Score		Set 1	Set 2	Set 3	Report
July 21	Capogrosso – Mehamed (ARG)	0–2	Cairus – Vieyto (URU)	11-21	18-21		

==== Bronze-medal match ====
Date		Score		Set 1	Set 2	Set 3	Report
July 21	E Grimalt – M Grimalt (CHI)	1–2	Díaz – González (CUB)	21-18	23-25	12-15	

==== Gold-medal match ====
Date		Score		Set 1	Set 2	Set 3	Report
July 21	Ontiveros – Virgen (MEX)	2–1	Araujo – Filho (BRA)	18-21	21-13	15-8	

=== Final standings ===
Rank	Team
1st place, gold medalist(s)	Rodolfo Ontiveros – Juan Virgen (MEX)
2nd place, silver medalist(s)	Vitor Araujo – Álvaro Morais Filho (BRA)
3rd place, bronze medalist(s)	Nivaldo Díaz – Sergio González (CUB)
4	Esteban Grimalt – Marco Grimalt (CHI)
5	Renzo Cairus – Mauricio Vieyto (URU)
6	Nicolas Capogrosso – Ian Mehamed (ARG)
7	Roberto Rodríguez – Erick Haddock (PUR)
8	Josh Binstock – Samuel Schachter (CAN)
9	Daneil Williams – Fabien Withfield (TRI)
10	Jackson Henríquez – Jesús Villafañe (VEN)
11	Miles Evans – Ian Satterfield (USA)
12	Ruben Mora Romero – Dany Lopez Alvarado (NIC)
13	Carlos Talavera – David Vargas (ESA)
14	Julian Bissette – Joseph Clercent (LCA)
15	Mitchel Daniel – Eargenell de Cuba (ARU)
16	Luis García Betancourt – Julio Recinos Ocaña (GUA)
