= Kouyo =

Kouyo is a surname. Notable people with the surname include:

- Arnaud Kouyo (born 1984), Ivorian footballer
- Rachelle Kouyo (born 1983), Ivorian handball player
