= Rosillo =

Rosillo is a surname. Notable people with the surname include:

- Alexandra López Rosillo (born 1989), Spanish footballer
- Antonio Canales Rosillo (1802–1852), Mexican military leader
- Joaquina Rosillo (born 1993), Uruguayan handball player
- José María Rosillo (born 1952), Spanish equestrian
