= Kuroki =

Kuroki (written: 黒木 lit. "black tree") is a Japanese surname. Notable people with the surname include:

- Akane Kuroki (黒木 茜, born 1978), Japanese equestrian
- Ben Kuroki (1917–2015), Japanese-American United States Air Force airman
- Haru Kuroki (黒木 華, born 1990), Japanese actress
- Hiroshi Kuroki (黒木 博, 1907–2001), former governor of Miyazaki Prefecture
- Hitomi Kuroki (黒木 瞳, born 1960), Japanese actress
- Kaoru Kuroki (黒木 香, born 1965), Japanese AV actress
- Kazuo Kuroki (黒木 和雄, 1930–2006), Japanese film director
- Keiji Kuroki (黒木 啓司, born 1980), Japanese dancer and actor
- Kohei Kuroki (黒木 晃平, born 1989), Japanese footballer
- Kyohei Kuroki (黒木 恭平, born 1989), Japanese footballer
- Marina Kuroki (黒木 マリナ, born 1988), Japanese actress
- Masato Kurogi (黒木 聖仁, born 1989), Japanese football player
- Meisa Kuroki (黒木 メイサ, born 1988), Japanese actress, model and singer
- Mika Kuroki (黒木 美香, born 1971), Japanese cyclist
- Satoko Kuroki (born 1986), Japanese handball player
- Tomohiro Kuroki (黒木 知宏, born 1973), former Nippon Professional Baseball pitcher
- Kuroki Tamemoto (黒木 為楨, 1844–1923), Japanese general
- Yūta Kuroki (黒木 優太, born 1994), Japanese baseball player

== Fictional characters ==
- Takayuki Kuroki (黒木隆之), a character in the manga series Wangan Midnight
- Takeru Kuroki (黒騎猛), a character in the anime series Active Raid
- Kuroki Gensai (黒木玄斎), a character in the anime series Kengan Ashura
- Tomoko Kuroki (黒木智子), the protagonist of the manga series WataMote
- Yasunori Kuroki (黒木泰則), a character in the manga series Nodame Cantabile
- Gai Kuroki (黒木凱), the protagonist of the manga series Shurato
- Kuroki Zenzou (黒木善三), a character in the manga series Inazuma Eleven GO

== See also ==
- Kuroki, Saskatchewan, a hamlet in Saskatchewan, Canada
