= Verdecia =

Verdecia or Verdecía is a surname. Notable people with the surname include:

- Legna Verdecia (born 1972), Cuban judoka
- Lorenze Verdecía Maturell (born 1960), Cuban handball coach
