= Fernanda Decnop =

Brazilian sailor (born 1987)

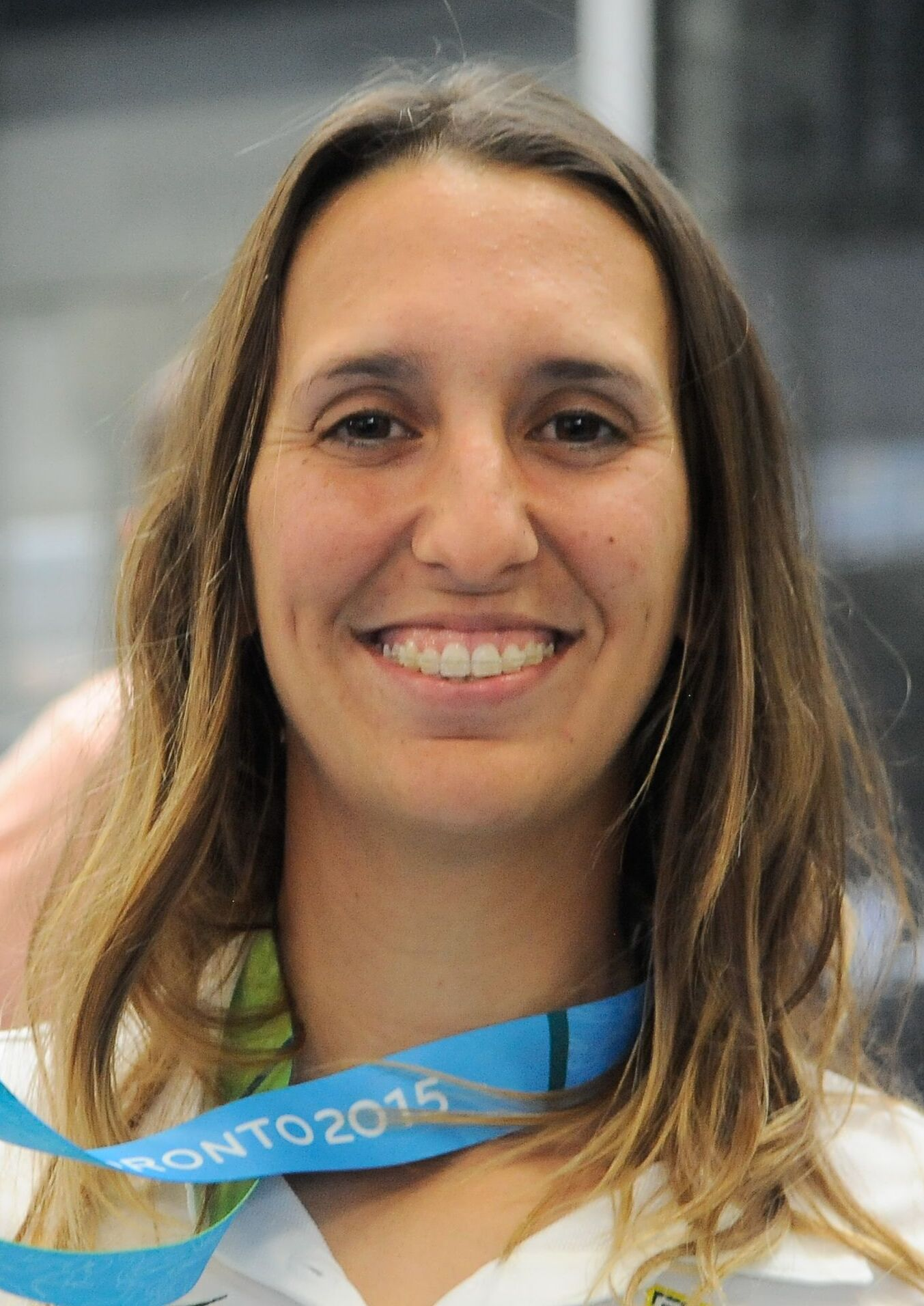
Fernanda Decnop with her Pan American medal.

Fernanda Demétrio Decnop Coelho (Niterói, June 19, 1987) is a Brazilian sailor. She won the bronze medal in the women's Laser Radial event at the 2015 Pan American Games. She placed 24th in the Laser Radial event at the 2016 Summer Olympics. Decnop is also a certified veterinarian, having attended the 2016 Summer Paralympics tending the horse of Alfonsina Maldonado, and sings in a progressive metal band.
