= Sailing at the 2015 Pan American Games – Laser Radial =

Women's Laser Radial at the 2015 Pan American Games
- Venue: Royal Canadian Yacht Club
- Dates: July 12 - July 18
- Competitors: 16 from 16 nations

Medalists
| Gold medal | Paige Railey | United States |
| Silver medal | Dolores Moreira | Uruguay |
| Bronze medal | Fernanda Demetrio Decnop | Brazil |

The women's Laser Radial competition of the sailing events at the 2015 Pan American Games in Toronto was held from July 12 to July 18 at the Royal Canadian Yacht Club. The last champion was Cecilia Saroli of Argentina.

Points were assigned based on the finishing position in each race (1 for first, 2 for second, etc.). The points were totaled from the top 11 results of the first 12 races, with lower totals being better. If a sailor was disqualified or did not complete the race, 17 points were assigned for that race (as there were 16 sailors in this competition). The top 8 sailors at that point competed in the final race, with placings counting double for final score. The sailor with the lowest total score won.

== Schedule ==
All times are Eastern Daylight Time (UTC-4).

| Date | Time | Round |
|---|---|---|
| July 12, 2015 | 11:35 | Race 1 |
| July 13, 2015 | 11:35 | Races 2 and 3 |
| July 14, 2015 | 11:35 | Race 4 |
| July 15, 2015 | 10:35 | Races 5, 6 and 7 |
| July 16, 2015 | 11:35 | Races 8, 9 and 10 |
| July 17, 2015 | 11:35 | Races 11 and 12 |
| July 18, 2015 | 11:35 | Medal race |

== Results ==
Race M is the medal race. Each boat can drop its lowest result provided that all ten races are completed. If less than ten races are completed all races will count. Boats cannot drop their result in the medal race.

| Rank | Athlete | Nation | Race | | | | | | | | | | | | | Total Points | Net Points |
| Rank | Athlete | Nation | 1 | 2 | 3 | 4 | 5 | 6 | 7 | 8 | 9 | 10 | 11 | 12 | M | Total Points | Net Points |
|---|---|---|---|---|---|---|---|---|---|---|---|---|---|---|---|---|---|
| 1st place, gold medalist(s) | Paige Railey | United States | 3 | 3 | 6 | 1 | 4 | 2 | (8) | 2 | 6 | 4 | 4 | 7 | 8 | 58 | 50 |
| 2nd place, silver medalist(s) | Dolores Moreira | Uruguay | 1 | (17); DSQ | 5 | 8 | 7 | 4 | 2 | 1 | 5 | 6 | 11 | 10 | 4 | 81 | 64 |
| 3rd place, bronze medalist(s) | Fernanda Demetrio Decnop | Brazil | 12 | 2 | 3 | 7 | (15) | 1 | 5 | 5 | 10 | 1 | 1 | 5 | 12 | 79 | 64 |
| 4 | Philipine van Aanholt | Aruba | 6 | 7 | 2 | 6 | (11) | 3 | 3 | 7 | 7 | 10 | 5 | 9 | 6 | 82 | 71 |
| 5 | Kelly-Ann Arrindell | Trinidad and Tobago | 2 | 11 | 9 | 10 | 3 | 7 | 7 | (12) | 4 | 8 | 3 | 6 | 2 | 84 | 72 |
| 6 | Lucía Falasca | Argentina | 5 | 1 | 11 | 5 | 5 | 8 | 11 | 4 | 1 | 3 | (15) | 2 | 16 | 87 | 72 |
| 7 | Daniela Rivera | Venezuela | 10 | 10 | 1 | 4 | 2 | 14 | (16) | 8 | 12 | 2 | 2 | 1 | 14 | 96 | 80 |
| 8 | Brenda Bowskill | Canada | 4 | 4 | 7 | 13 | 8 | 6 | 12 | 3 | (14) | 5 | 13 | 3 | 10 | 102 | 88 |
| 9 | Paloma Schmidt | Peru | 9 | 6 | 4 | 3 | 6 | (13) | 1 | 9 | 9 | 9 | 11 | 12 | | 93 | 80 |
| 10 | Andrea Aldana | Guatemala | 8 | 5 | 8 | 9 | 12 | 9 | 4 | 6 | 8 | 13 | (14) | 8 | | 104 | 90 |
| 11 | Stephanie Lovell | Saint Lucia | 7 | 8 | 12 | 14 | (16) | 5 | 10 | 11 | 11 | 7 | 6 | 4 | | 111 | 95 |
| 12 | Cecilia Wollmann | Bermuda | 11 | 12 | (14) | 2 | 10 | 10 | 6 | 12 | 2 | 12 | 9 | 11 | | 112 | 98 |
| 13 | Sanlay Castro | Cuba | 14 | 14 | (16) | 12 | 9 | 11 | 9 | 16 | 3 | 16 | 10 | 13 | | 143 | 127 |
| 14 | Maria Poncell | Chile | 13 | 9 | 13 | 11 | 13 | (15) | 13 | 10 | 13 | 11 | 8 | 15 | | 144 | 129 |
| 15 | Natalia Montemayor | Mexico | 15 | 13 | 10 | (16) | 1 | 12 | 14 | 14 | 15 | 15 | 16 | 14 | | 155 | 139 |
| 16 | Romina de Iulio Garcia | Ecuador | 16 | 15 | 15 | 15 | 14 | 17 (OCS) | 15 | 15 | 16 | 14 | 7 | 16 | | 175 | 158 |
