= Haruka Wakaizumi =

Japanese handball player (born 1987)

Personal information
- Nationality: Japanese
- Born: 1987 (age 38–39)

Sport
- Sport: Handball
National team
- Years: Team
- –: Japan

Haruka Wakaizumi (若泉 春香, Wakaizumi Haruka; born 1987) is a Japanese team handball player. She plays on the Japanese national team, and participated at the 2011 World Women's Handball Championship in Brazil.
