= Ndoua Lydie Yamkou =

Ivorian handball player

Personal information
- Nationality: Ivorian
- Born: 1984 (age 41–42)

Sport
- Sport: Handball
National team
- Years: Team
- –: Ivory Coast

Ndoua Lydie Yamkou (born 1984) is an Ivorian team handball player. She plays on the Ivorian national team, and participated at the 2011 World Women's Handball Championship in Brazil.
