= Aimone Duce =

Italian painter

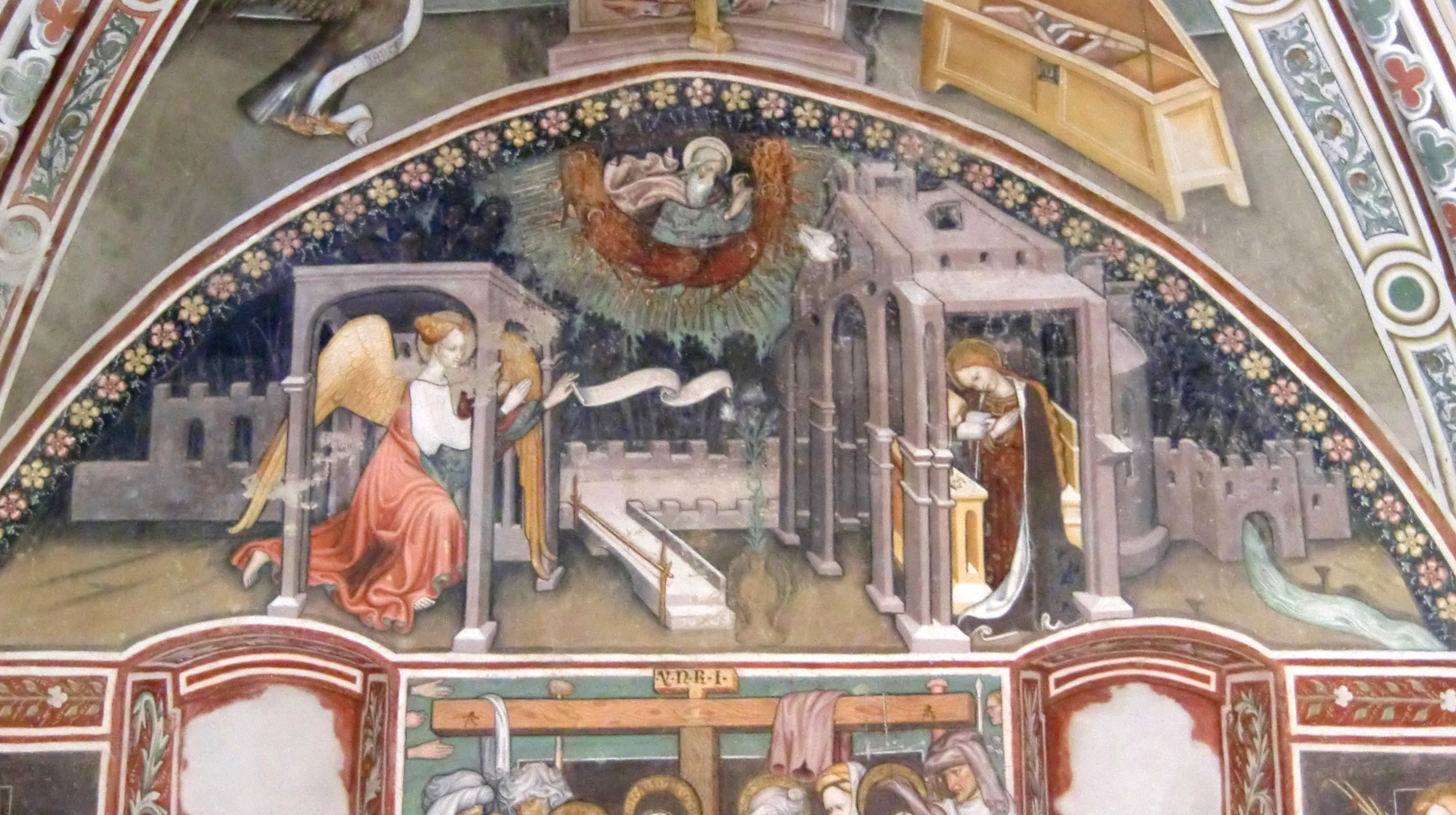
Annunciazione, circa 1430

Aimone Duce (also called Aimo Dux and Dux Aymo; fl. 1417–1444) was an Italian painter active at the court of Savoy-Acaia. He was a native of Pavia, in Lombardy. Although few of Aimone's works survive, and records of his life and art are scant, he is much studied in Piedmont art history. A late gothic painter, his works are considered to be of high quality by Piedmont art scholars, showing the influence of his Lombardian origins and probable training. Aimone was a contemporary of Giacomo Jaquerio and they had the patronage of the lords of Savoy in common.

Works of Aimone are known at three locations. Major fresco cycles are painted in two churches of the Pineroloese: The Cappella di Missione at Villafranca Piemonte and the Cappella di Santa Maria Assunta (Note: The Cappella di Santa Maria Assunta (the 'chapel of the Assumption of Mary') is often called the "Santa Maria della Stella" or, simply "Cappella di Stella", because it is located in the hamlet of Stella within the commune of Macello The chapel's dedication is to the Assumption, and not to the Marian title "Holy Mary of the Star".) in the hamlet of Stella at Macello. A third, less extensive, fresco is in the church of San Pietro at Pianezza.

== Works ==
His extant works in the Villafranca Piemonte chapel include a cycle of frescoes. One wall of the sanctuary depicts an allegorical Cavalcade of the Deadly Sins with the theological virtues shown above, the earliest known work on such a theme within the Piedmont. There are a series of saints on both the left and right walls.

The final work attributed to Aimone is a fresco of Saint Sebastian's martyrdom in the parish church of San Pietro at Pianezza, an ex-voto commissioned following an episode of plaque that struck the town in 1428.

== See also ==
- From Italian Wikipedia (in Italian):
  - Cappella di Missione, the mission chapel of Villafranca Piemonte
  - Savoia-Acaia, branch of the house of Savoy and patrons of the artist
  - Pieve di San Pietro, the parish church of Saint Peter the apostle in Pianezza

== Bibliography ==
- Baiocco S., Castronovo S., Pagella E., 2003, Arte in Piemonte - Il Gotico, Ivrea, Priuli & Verlucca Editori
- Bertolotto, C.; Garavelli, N.; Gabrieli, B. Oderzo. (2011). "'Magister Dux Aymo pictor de Papie'. Un pittore pavese in Piemonte (notizie 1417–1444)". Arte Lombarda, no. 163, 2011 (3), pp. 5–45. JSTOR 43106494. An article in three parts:
  - Bertolotto, Claudio (January 2011). "L'arte di Dux Aymo alla luce dei recenti ritrovamenti e restauri" [The art of Dux Aymo in light of recent discoveries and restorations]. Arte Lombarda (in Italian). 2011 (3): 5–15. no. 163.
  - Gabrieli, Bernardo Oderzo (January 2011). "Tecniche di pittura murale a confronto. La cultura materiale di Dux Aymo tra Lombardia e Piemonte" [Mural painting techniques compared. The material culture of Dux Aymo between Lombardy and Piedmont]. Arte Lombarda (in Italian). 2011 (3): 29–45. no. 163.
  - Garavelli, Nicoletta (January 2011). "Villafranca a Ivrea: qualche precisazione sul corpus delle opere, sui collaboratori e sui committenti di Dux Aymo" [Villafranca in Ivrea: some clarifications on the corpus of Dux Aymo, his collaborators and clients]. Arte Lombarda (in Italian). 2011 (3): 16–29. no. 163.
- Arabella Cifani, Franco Monetti, Carlotta Venegoni, Marco Piccat, con la collaborazione di Augusto Cantamessa, La cappella di Santa Maria di Missione di Villafranca Piemonte. Un capolavoro del gotico internazionale italiano, Torino, Umberto Allemandi ed., 2014
- Di Macco M., 1979, scheda Dux Aymo, 1429 in Castelnuovo E., Romano G., Giacomo Jaquerio e il gotico internazionale, (catalogo mostra), Palazzo Madama
- Ferrero F. G., Formica E., 2002, Arte medievale nel Canavese, Ivrea, Priuli & Verlucca Editori
- Garavelli, Nicoletta (April 2002). "Dux Aymo (1417–1444): Ultime ricerche sui documenti d'archivio". Bollettino della Società Piemontese di archeologia e Belle Arti (in Italian). Nuova Serie: LII: 77–88.
- Ernst Gombrich, Dizionario della Pittura e dei Pittori, Einaudi Editore, 1997
