= Maidelis Saldiña =

Cuban handball player (born 1988)

Personal information
- Full name: Maidelis Saldiña Rivero
- Nationality: Cuban
- Born: May 15, 1988 (age 38)
- Height: 177

Sport
- Sport: Handball
- Position: Goalkeeper

Senior clubs
- Years: Team
- –: Matanzas
National team
- Years: Team
- –: Cuba

Maidelis Saldiña Rivero (born 1988) is a team handball goalkeeper from Cuba. She plays on the Cuba women's national handball team, and participated at the 2011 World Women's Handball Championship in Brazil.
