= Won Hire Coulibaly =

Ivorian handball player

Won Hire Coulibaly (born 1989) is an Ivorian handball player. She plays on the Ivorian national team, and participated at the 2011 World Women's Handball Championship in Brazil.
