= Amon Olive Assemon =

Ivorian handball player

Personal information
- Nationality: Ivorian
- Born: 12 November 1987 (age 38)
- Height: 1.68 m (5 ft 6 in)

Sport
- Sport: Handball
- Position: Right wing

Senior clubs
- Years: Team
- –: Club Africain
National team
- Years: Team
- –: Ivory Coast

Amon Olive Assemon (born 12 November 1987) is an Ivorian international team handball player.

== Career ==
Assemon has played for the Ivorian national team. She participated at the 2011 World Women's Handball Championship in Brazil, were Ivory Coast advanced from the group stage, but was eliminated by eventual world champion Brazil in the knockout stage.

Assemon played for the Ivorian national team at the 2015 African Games, where she scored two goals in the group match against DR Congo.
