= Mandy Burrekers =

Dutch team handball goalkeeper (born 1988)

Personal information
- Nationality: Dutch
- Born: 10 January 1988 (age 38) Amsterdam, Netherlands

Sport
- Sport: Handball
- Position: Goalkeeper

Senior clubs
- Years: Team
- –2005: De Volewijckers
- 2005–2008: TSG Ketsch
- 2008–2009: Gjerpen IF
- 2009–2013: Frankfurter HC
- 2013–2018: Borussia Dortmund Handball
National team
Years	Team	Apps	(Gls)
2009–2011	Netherlands	9	(1)

Mandy Burrekers (born 10 January 1988) is a Dutch team handball goalkeeper. She last played for German handball club Borussia Dortmund Handball, and participated at the 2011 World Women's Handball Championship in Brazil.
