= Carmen Cartaș =

Romanian handball player (born 1985)

Personal information
- Full name: Carmen Florentina Cartaș
- Nationality: Romanian
- Born: 9 May 1985 (age 41) Constanţa, Romania
- Height: 1.82 m (6 ft 0 in)

Sport
- Sport: Handball
- Position: Left Back
- Current club: Corona Brașov

Youth career
- Years: Team
- –2003: CSȘ Energetic Râmnicu Vâlcea

Senior clubs
- Years: Team
- 2003–2012: Cetate Devatrans Deva
- 2012–2013: → „U” Jolidon Cluj (loan)
- 2013–2015: Cetate Devatrans Deva
- 2015–: Corona Brașov
National team
- Years: Team
- 2011–: Romania

Carmen Florentina Cartaș (born 9 May 1985) is a Romanian team handball player who plays as a left back for Corona Brașov. She participated at the 2011 World Women's Handball Championship in Brazil.

== Individual awards ==
- Romanian Liga Naţională: 2011, 2014
