= Lucia Giamberardino =

Argentine handball player

Personal information
- Nationality: Argentinian
- Born: 6 March 1990 (age 36)

Sport
- Sport: Handball
National team
- Years: Team
- –: Argentina

Lucia Giamberardino (born 6 March 1990) is a team handball player from Argentina. She defends Argentina, such as at the 2011 World Women's Handball Championship in Brazil.
