= Sery Toualy =

Ivorian handball player

Sery Toualy (born 1986) is an Ivorian handball player. She plays on the Ivorian national team, and participated at the 2011 World Women's Handball Championship in Brazil.
