= Maidoly Poumier =

Cuban handball player (born 1984)

Personal information
- Full name: Maidoly Poumier Machado
- Nationality: Cuban
- Born: January 2, 1984 (age 42)
- Height: 169 cm (67 in)

Sport
- Sport: Handball

Senior clubs
- Years: Team
- –: Habana
National team
- Years: Team
- –: Cuba

Maidoly Poumier Machado (born 2 January 1984) is a team handball player from Cuba. She has played on the Cuba women's national handball team, and participated at the 2011 World Women's Handball Championship in Brazil.
