= Yizenia Aldama =

Cuban team handball goalkeeper (born 1989)

Personal information
- Nationality: Cuban
- Born: May 25, 1989 (age 37)
- Height: 168 cm (66 in)

Sport
- Sport: Handball

Senior clubs
- Years: Team
- –: GRM
National team
- Years: Team
- –: Cuba

Yizenia Aldama Miranda (born 25 May 1989) is a Cuban team handball goalkeeper. She has played on the Cuban national team, and participated at the 2011 World Women's Handball Championship in Brazil.
