= Mohamed Ali Sghir =

Tunisian team handball coach

Mohamed Ali Sghir is a Tunisian handball coach. He coaches the Tunisian national team, and participated at the 2011 World Women's Handball Championship in Brazil.
