= Rossina Soca =

Uruguayan handball player (born 1988)

Personal information
- Born: 17 May 1988 (age 38) Montevideo, Uruguay
- Height: 1.75 m (5 ft 9 in)

Sport
- Sport: Handball
- Position: Goalkeeper

Senior clubs
- Years: Team
- 2000-2007: AEBU
- 2007-2022: Layva
National team
- Years: Team
- 2008 - 2022: Uruguay

Rossina Soca (born 17 May 1988) is a team handball goalkeeper from Uruguay. She has played on the Uruguay women's national handball team, and participated at the 2011 World Women's Handball Championship in Brazil.
