= Ariagne Cuesta =

Cuban team handball player (born 1987)

Personal information
- Nationality: Cuban
- Born: August 12, 1987 (age 39)
- Height: 176 cm (69 in)

Sport
- Sport: Handball

Senior clubs
- Years: Team
- –: Matanzas
National team
- Years: Team
- –: Cuba

Ariagne Cuesta Zulueta (born 12 August 1987) is a Cuban team handball player. She has played on the Cuban national team, and participated at the 2011 World Women's Handball Championship in Brazil.
