= Yumiko Yamano =

Japanese handball player (born 1988)

Yumiko Yamano (born 27 July 1988 in Kanazawa, Japan) is a Japanese handball player. She plays on the Japanese national team, and participated at the 2011 World Women's Handball Championship in Brazil.
