= Roxanne Bovenberg =

Dutch handball player (born 1989)

Personal information
- Nationality: Dutch
- Born: 30 July 1989 (age 37) Vlaardingen, Netherlands
- Height: 170 cm (67 in)

Sport
- Sport: Handball
- Position: Right back

Senior clubs
- Years: Team
- –2004: Hollandiaan
- 2004–2010: HV Quintus
- 2010–2011: Westfriesland/SEW
- 2011–2012: Bayer Leverkusen
- 2012–2012: Slagelse FH
- 2012–2013: Fleury Loiret HB
- 2013–2014: Westfriesland/SEW
- 2014–2018: Schuler Afbouwgroep DOS
- 2018–: HV Aalsmeer
National team
- Years: Team
- 2007–: Netherlands

Roxanne Bovenberg (born 30 July 1989) is a Dutch team handball player. She plays on the Dutch national team, and participated at the 2011 World Women's Handball Championship in Brazil.
