= Dolores Moreira =

Uruguayan sailor (born 1999)

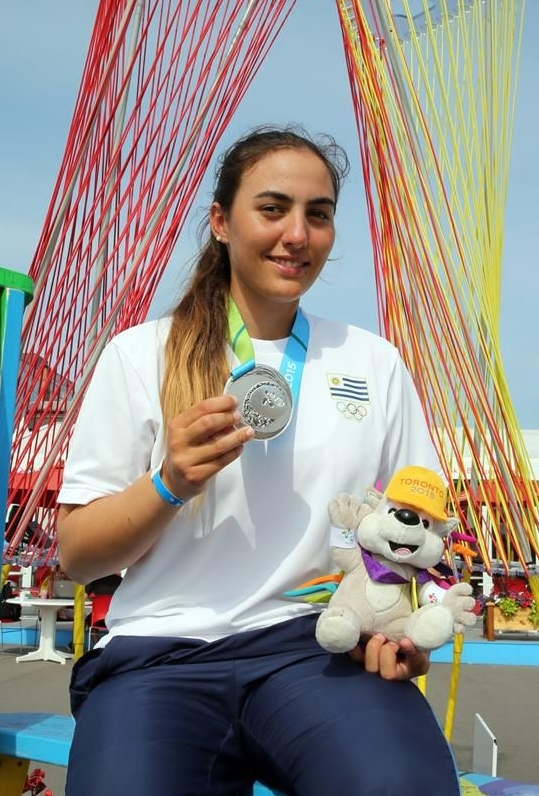

Personal information
- Full name: Dolores Moreira Fraschini
- Nickname: Lola
- Born: 16 February 1999 (age 27) Paysandú, Uruguay
- Height: 1.66 m (5 ft 5 in)
- Weight: 64 kg (141 lb)

Sailing career
- Sport: Sailing
- Classes: ILCA 6, Byte, Optimist, ILCA 4
Medal record
Sailing
Representing Uruguay
Pan American Games
Silver medal – second place	2015 Toronto	Women's Laser Radial

Dolores "Lola" Moreira Fraschini (Note: In this Spanish name, the first or paternal surname is Moreira and the second or maternal family name is Fraschini.) (born 16 February 1999 in Paysandú) is a Uruguayan sailor who races the Laser Radial. She has competed at three Olympic Games as well as one Youth Olympic Games in 2014.

== Career ==
In 2014, she competed in, and was Uruguay's flagbearer at the Summer Youth Olympics. She won the last race and finished 9th in the Girls' Byte CII class.

In July 2015, she was again named Uruguay's flagbearer, but now for the 2015 Pan American Games opening ceremony, after track and field athlete Déborah Rodríguez could not arrive on time to Toronto due to flight problems.

In 2016, she was for a third time named Uruguay's flagbearer for the 2016 Summer Olympics. She placed 25th in the women's Laser Radial competition.

At both the 2020 and 2024 Olympics she placed 22nd.

== Results ==
- 2014 Youth Olympic Games: 9th
- 2015 Pan American Games: (silver)
- 2014 ISAF Sailing World Championships: 31st
- 2014 ISAF Youth Sailing World Championships: 10th

== Notes ==
Olympic Games
Preceded by Rodolfo Collazo	Flagbearer for Uruguay; Rio de Janeiro 2016	Succeeded by Bruno Cetraro
