= Miguel Interllige =

Spanish handball coach (born 1956)

Miguel Angel Interllige (born 1956) is a handball coach from Spain. He coached the Argentina women's national team for 3 years, and led them at the 2011 World Women's Handball Championship in Brazil. He also won a silver medal at the 2011 Pan American Games.

Later he coached the Chilean youth national team.
