= Fernanda Marrochi =

Uruguayan handball player (born 1988)

Personal information
- Nationality: Uruguayan
- Born: 2 July 1988 (age 38)
- Height: 170 cm (67 in)

Sport
- Sport: Handball
- Position: Left back
National team
- Years: Team
- –: Uruguay

Fernanda Marrochi (born 2 July 1988) is a team handball player from Uruguay. She has played on the Uruguay women's national handball team, and participated at the 2011 World Women's Handball Championship in Brazil.
