= Yohou Christiane Guede =

Ivorian handball player

Yohou Christiane Guede (born 1978) is an Ivorian handball player. She plays on the Ivorian national team, and participated at the 2011 World Women's Handball Championship in Brazil.
