= Paula Basaistegui =

Uruguayan handball player (born 1988)

Personal information
- Nationality: Uruguayan
- Born: 14 November 1988 (age 37)
- Height: 161 cm (63 in)

Sport
- Sport: Handball
- Position: Center back
National team
- Years: Team
- –: Uruguay

Paula Basaistegui (born 14 November 1988) is a team handball player from Uruguay. She has played on the Uruguay women's national handball team, and participated at the 2011 World Women's Handball Championship in Brazil.
