= Amenan Koffi =

Ivorian handball player

Amenan Koffi (born 1978) is an Ivorian handball goalkeeper. She plays on the Ivorian national team, and participated at the 2011 World Women's Handball Championship in Brazil.
