= Badjo Edwige Lobouet =

Ivorian handball player

Personal information
- Nationality: Ivorian
- Born: 1989 (age 36–37)

Sport
- Sport: Handball
National team
- Years: Team
- –: Ivory Coast

Badjo Edwige Lobouet (born 1989) is an Ivorian handball player. who represents the Ivory Coast women's national team. She participated in the 2011 World Women's Handball Championship held in Brazil.
