= Tanja Kiridžić =

Croatian handball player (born 1986)

Personal information
- Nationality: Croatian
- Born: 7 July 1986 (age 40) Pula, Croatia
- Height: 1.72 m (5 ft 8 in)

Sport
- Sport: Handball
- Position: Centre back

Senior clubs
- Years: Team
- –: ŽRK Arena
- –: RK Podravka Koprivnica
- –: Iuventa Michalovce
National team
- Years: Team
- –: Croatia

Tanja Kiridžić (born 7 July 1986 in Pula, Croatia) is a Croatian former team handball player. She played on the Croatian national team, and participated at the 2011 World Women's Handball Championship in Brazil.

She has played for the Croatian clubs RK Arena and RK Podravka Koprivnica and the Slovak club Iuventa Michalovce.
