= Mauricio Vieyto =

Uruguayan volleyball player (born 1996)

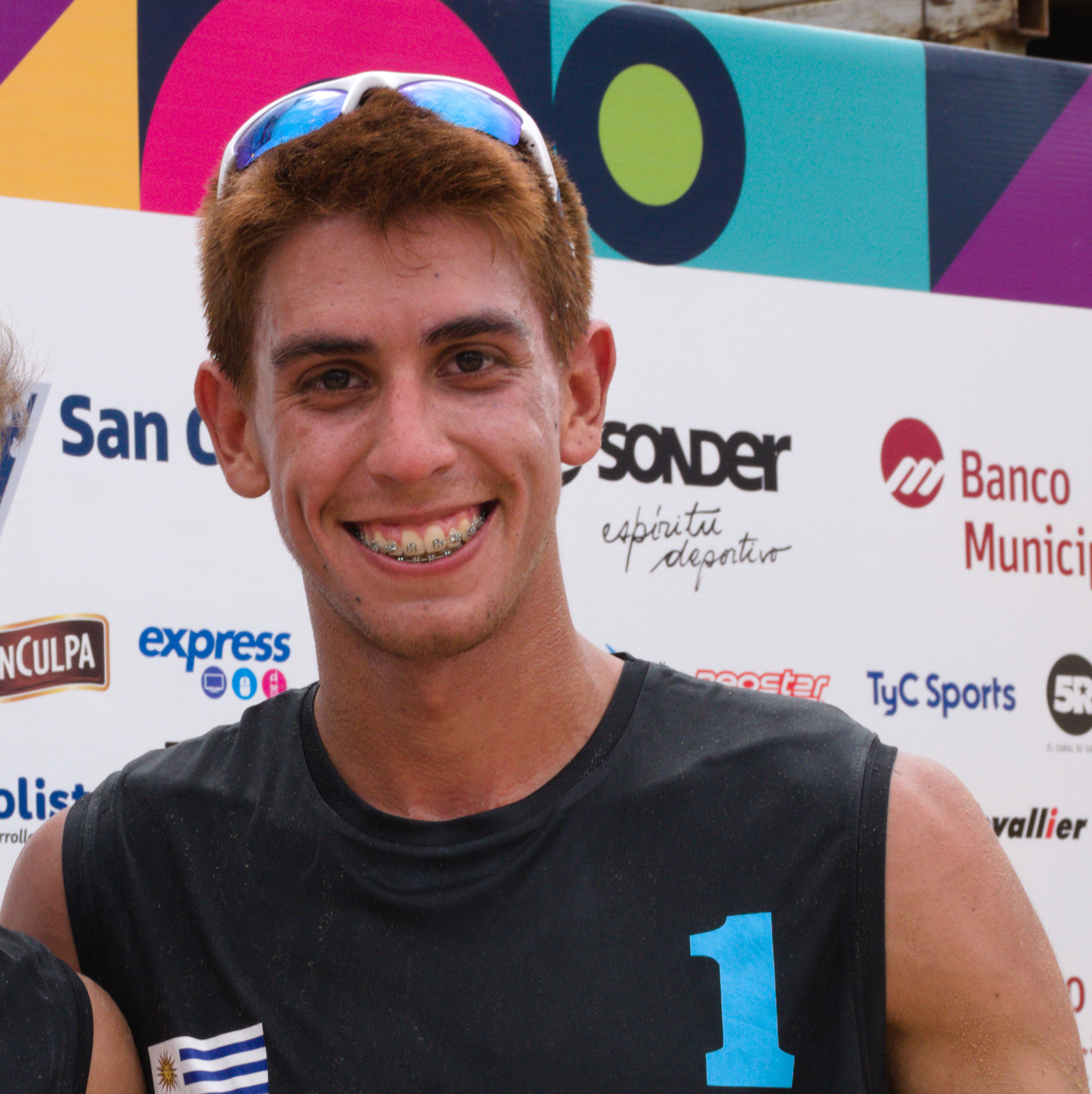
- Vieyto at the 2019 South American Beach Games

Personal information
- Full name: Mauricio Vieyto Acosta
- Born: 5 December 1996 (age 29); Montevideo, Uruguay
- Height: 6 ft 3 in (1.91 m)
- Weight: 76 kg (168 lb)
- Spike: 348 cm (137 in)
- Block: 333 cm (131 in)

Beach volleyball information
Years	Teammate
2015	Renzo Cairus

Indoor volleyball information
- Current club: Athlitiki Enosi Neon Paralimniou

Mauricio Vieyto Acosta (born 5 December 1996 in Montevideo) is a Uruguayan volleyball player.

== Results ==
Pan American Games

- 2015 Toronto: 5th (with Renzo Cairus)

Summer Youth Olympics

- 2014 Nanjing: 5th (with Marco Cairus)

== Clubs ==
- (Uruguay) Club Social y Deportivo Juan Ferreira (2019-2020)
- (Cyprus) Athlitiki Enosi Neon Paralimniou (2020-2021)
- (Greece) AOK Kalamata 1980 (2022-actualidad)
