= Mariana Gómez =

Uruguayan handball player (born 1990)

Personal information
- Nationality: Uruguayan
- Born: 11 July 1990 (age 36)
- Height: 160 cm (63 in)

Sport
- Sport: Handball
- Position: Left wing
National team
- Years: Team
- –: Uruguay

Mariana Gómez (born 11 July 1990) is a team handball player from Uruguay. As of 2011 she played on the Uruguay women's national handball team, and she participated at the 2011 World Women's Handball Championship in Brazil.
