= Ndri Elise Kangah =

Ivorian handball player

Personal information
- Nationality: Ivorian
- Born: 1983 (age 42–43)

Sport
- Sport: Handball
National team
- Years: Team
- –: Ivory Coast

Ndri Elise Kangah (born 1983) is an Ivorian team handball goalkeeper. She plays on the Ivorian national team, and participated at the 2011 World Women's Handball Championship in Brazil.
