= Anna Nikitina =

Kazakhstani handball player

Personal information
- Nationality: Kazakhstani
- Born: April 16, 1987 (age 39)
- Height: 167 cm (66 in)

Sport
- Sport: Handball

Senior clubs
- Years: Team
- –: Astana HC
National team
- Years: Team
- –: Kazakhstan

Anna Nikitina (born 16 April 1987) is a handball player from Kazakhstan. She has played on the Kazakhstan women's national handball team, and participated at the 2011 World Women's Handball Championship in Brazil.
