= Joaquina Rosillo =

Uruguayan handball player (born 1993)

Personal information
- Nationality: Uruguayan
- Born: 11 August 1993 (age 33)
- Height: 175 cm (69 in)

Sport
- Sport: Handball
- Position: Pivot
National team
- Years: Team
- –: Uruguay

Joaquina Rosillo (born 11 August 1993) is a team handball player from Uruguay. She has played on the Uruguay women's national handball team, and participated at the 2011 World Women's Handball Championship in Brazil.

In 2010, she competed in the Youth World Handball Championship in Dominican Republic.
