= Satoko Kuroki =

Japanese handball player (born 1986)

Satoko Kuroki (born 1986) is a Japanese handball player. She plays on the Japanese national team, and participated at the 2011 World Women's Handball Championship in Brazil.
