= Paula Fynn =

Uruguayan handball player (born 1988)

Personal information
- Nationality: Uruguayan
- Born: 11 April 1988 (age 38)
- Height: 164 cm (65 in)

Sport
- Sport: Handball
- Position: Right wing
National team
- Years: Team
- –: Uruguay
Medal record
Pan American Games
| Bronze medal – third place | 2015 Toronto | Team |

Paula Fynn (born 11 April 1988) is a team handball player from Uruguay. She has played on the Uruguay women's national handball team, and participated at the 2011 World Women's Handball Championship in Brazil.
