= Soledad Faedo =

Uruguayan handball player (born 1987)

Personal information
- Nationality: Uruguayan
- Born: 17 December 1987 (age 38)
- Height: 170 cm (67 in)

Sport
- Sport: Handball
- Position: Left wing
National team
- Years: Team
- –: Uruguay
Medal record
Pan American Games
Bronze medal – third place	2015 Toronto	Team

Soledad Faedo (born 17 December 1987) is a team handball player from Uruguay. She has played on the Uruguay women's national handball team, and participated at the 2005 World Women's Handball Championship in Russia and the 2011 World Women's Handball Championship in Brazil.
