= Vitor Araújo =

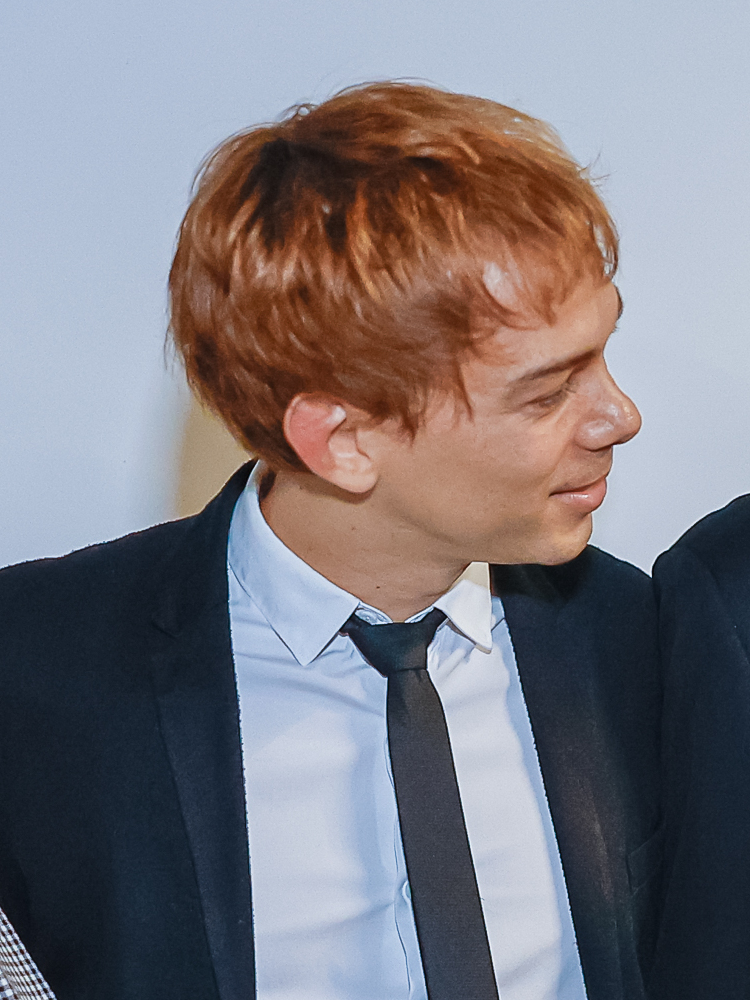

Background information
- Born: 13 June 1989 (age 36); Recife (Pernambuco)
- Instrument: piano
- Years active: 2008-present

Vitor Araújo is a Brazilian pianist.

== Discography ==
=== Solo albums ===
- Toc (2008)
- A/B (2014)
- Levaguiã Terê (2016)

=== Alongside Arnaldo Antunes ===
- Lágrimas no Mar (2021)

=== Singles ===
- Le Passage d'une Planète Nomade dans un Système Solaire (2021)
- Le Présent qui Déborde (2019)
