= Florencia Aimone =

Argentine handball player

Personal information
- Nationality: Argentine
- Born: 23 November 1990 (age 35)

Sport
- Sport: Handball
National team
- Years: Team
- –: Argentina

Florencia Aimone (born 23 November 1990) is a team handball player from Argentina. She defends Argentina, such when she competed in the 2011 World Women's Handball Championship in Brazil. Florencia has a master's degree in architecture from the University of Buenos Aires. She has experience in project, construction management and interior design. Before coming to Australia, Florencia worked for an architecture studio, participating in a variety of residential and commercial projects throughout Argentina. She also worked for particular projects, as a Construction Manager and Interior Designer Assistant, where she gained versatility and knowledge in different fields.
