= Rachelle Kouyo =

Ivorian handball player

Rachelle Kouyo (born 1983) is an Ivorian handball player. She plays on the Ivorian national team, and participated at the 2011 World Women's Handball Championship in Brazil.
