= Alesandra Ferrari =

Uruguayan handball player (born 1987)

Personal information
- Nationality: Uruguayan
- Born: January 6, 1987 (age 39)
- Height: 176 cm (69 in)

Sport
- Sport: Handball
- Position: Left back
National team
- Years: Team
- –: Uruguay
Medal record
Pan American Games
Bronze medal – third place	2015 Toronto	Team

Alesandra Ferrari (born 6 January 1987) is a team handball player from Uruguay. She plays on the Uruguay women's national handball team, and participated at the 2005 World Women's Handball Championship in Russia and the 2011 World Women's Handball Championship in Brazil.
