= Viviana Ferrari =

Uruguayan handball player (born 1992)

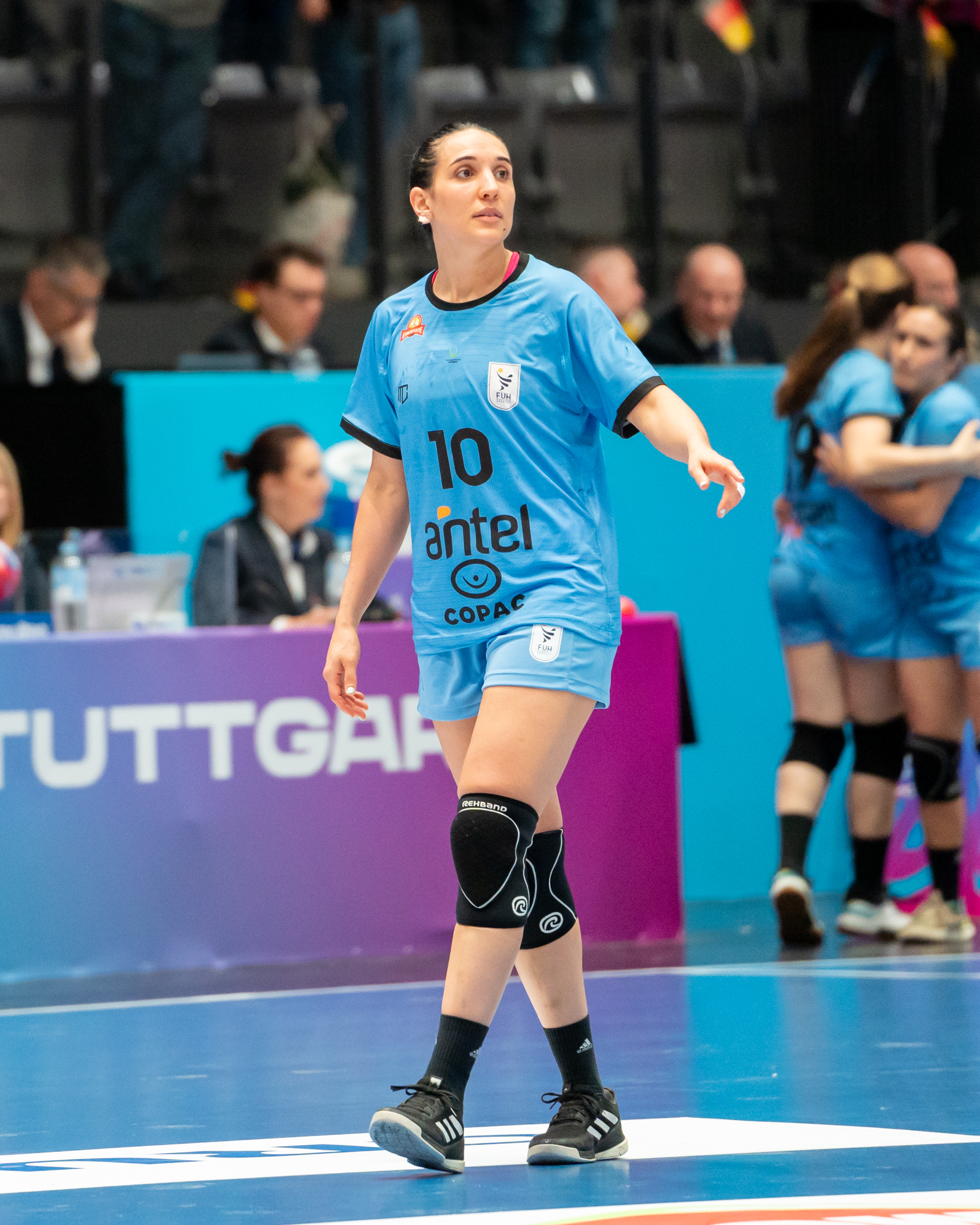

Personal information
- Nationality: Uruguayan
- Born: 25 March 1992 (age 34)
- Height: 170 cm (67 in)

Sport
- Sport: Handball
- Position: Rgiht wing

Senior clubs
- Years: Team
- 2011 – 2025: Club Atlético Goes
National team
Years	Team	Apps	(Gls)
–	Uruguay	190	(450)
Medal record
Pan American Games
Bronze medal – third place	2015 Toronto	Team
South and Central American Championship
Bronze medal – third place	2024 Brazil

Viviana Ferrari (born 25 March 1992) is a team handball player from Uruguay. She plays on the Uruguay women's national handball team, and participated at the 2011 World Women's Handball Championship in Brazil.

In 2010, she competed in the Youth World Handball Championship in Dominican Republic.
