= Lorenze Verdecía Maturell =

Cuban handball coach (born 1960)

Lorenze Verdecía Maturell (1960 - 6 January 2026) was a handball coach from Cuba. He coached the Cuba women's national handball team for nearly a decade, and won a silver medal at the 2007 Pan American Games. He also participated at the 2011 World Women's Handball Championship in Brazil.
