= 2003 World Wrestling Championships – Men's freestyle 66 kg =

Men's freestyle 66 kg at the 2003 World Championships
- Venue: Madison Square Garden
- Dates: 12–14 September 2003
- Competitors: 40 from 40 nations

Medalists
gold medal	Irbek Farniev	Russia
silver medal	Serafim Barzakov	Bulgaria
bronze medal	Kazuhiko Ikematsu	Japan

The men's freestyle 66 kilograms is a competition featured at the 2003 World Wrestling Championships, and was held at the Madison Square Garden in New York, United States from 12 to 14 September 2003.

== Results ==
=== Preliminary round ===
==== Pool 1 ====
Pos	Athlete	Pld	W	L	CP	TP	ARM	ROM	BRA
1	Zhirayr Hovhannisyan (ARM)	2	2	0	7	36	—	8–4	28–0
2	László Szabolcs (ROM)	2	1	1	5	14	1–3 PP	—	10–0 Fall
3	Rafael Borges (BRA)	2	0	2	0	0	0–4 ST	0–4 TO	—

Source: Official website

==== Pool 2 ====
Pos	Athlete	Pld	W	L	CP	TP	GEO	TJK	TPE
1	Otar Tushishvili (GEO)	2	2	0	8	20	—	10–0	10–0
2	Eradj Davlatov (TJK)	2	1	1	4	3	0–4 ST	—	3–0 Fall
3	Kuo Yang-ming (TPE)	2	0	2	0	0	0–4 ST	0–4 TO	—

Source: Official website

==== Pool 3 ====
Pos	Athlete	Pld	W	L	CP	TP	CUB	USA	IND
1	Serguei Rondón (CUB)	2	2	0	7	18	—	10–0	8–5
2	Jamill Kelly (USA)	2	1	1	3	6	0–4 ST	—	6–1
3	Ramesh Kumar (IND)	2	0	2	2	6	1–3 PP	1–3 PP	—

Source: Official website

==== Pool 4 ====
Pos	Athlete	Pld	W	L	CP	TP	MDA	FRA	TUR
1	Ruslan Bodișteanu (MDA)	2	2	0	7	13	—	5–1	8–4 Fall
2	Ibrahim Selloum (FRA)	2	1	1	4	8	1–3 PP	—	7–6
3	Ömer Çubukçu (TUR)	2	0	2	1	10	0–4 TO	1–3 PP	—

Source: Official website

==== Pool 5 ====
Pos	Athlete	Pld	W	L	CP	TP	SVK	KGZ	GER
1	Štefan Fernyák (SVK)	2	2	0	6	7	—	4–1	3–2
2	Suimonkul Tabaldy Uulu (KGZ)	2	1	1	4	4	1–3 PP	—	3–2
3	Engin Ürün (GER)	2	0	2	2	4	1–3 PP	1–3 PP	—

Source: Official website

==== Pool 6 ====
Pos	Athlete	Pld	W	L	CP	TP	BUL	EST	IRI
1	Serafim Barzakov (BUL)	2	2	0	6	7	—	3–0	4–2
2	Ahto Raska (EST)	2	1	1	4	0	0–3 PO	—	WO
3	Alireza Dabir (IRI)	2	0	2	1	2	1–3 PP	0–4 PA	—

Source: Official website

==== Pool 7 ====
Pos	Athlete	Pld	W	L	CP	TP	HUN	AZE	TKM
1	Gergő Szabó (HUN)	2	2	0	6	6	—	3–2	3–0
2	Elman Asgarov (AZE)	2	1	1	4	11	1–3 PP	—	9–3
3	Alai Niýazmengliýew (TKM)	2	0	2	1	3	0–3 PO	1–3 PP	—

Source: Official website

==== Pool 8 ====
Pos	Athlete	Pld	W	L	CP	TP	CAN	UZB	BLR
1	Evan MacDonald (CAN)	2	1	1	4	15	—	12–7	3–6
2	Artur Tavkazakhov (UZB)	2	1	1	4	13	1–3 PP	—	6–2
3	Sergey Demchenko (BLR)	2	1	1	4	8	3–1 PP	1–3 PP	—

Source: Official website

==== Pool 9 ====
Pos	Athlete	Pld	W	L	CP	TP	UKR	MKD	SUI
1	Elbrus Tedeyev (UKR)	2	2	0	7	16	—	9–0 Fall	7–0
2	Lulzim Vrenezi (MKD)	2	1	1	4	8	0–4 TO	—	8–4 Fall
3	Grégory Sarrasin (SUI)	2	0	2	0	4	0–3 PO	0–4 TO	—

Source: Official website

==== Pool 10 ====
Pos	Athlete	Pld	W	L	CP	TP	KOR	KAZ	COL
1	Baek Jin-kuk (KOR)	2	2	0	7	17	—	4–1	13–3
2	Leonid Spiridonov (KAZ)	2	1	1	5	11	1–3 PP	—	10–0
3	Edison Hurtado (COL)	2	0	2	1	3	1–4 SP	0–4 ST	—

Source: Official website

==== Pool 11 ====
Pos	Athlete	Pld	W	L	CP	TP	RUS	ALB	SEN
1	Irbek Farniev (RUS)	2	2	0	8	20	—	10–0	10–0
2	Leonard Cakmashi (ALB)	2	1	1	4	3	0–4 ST	—	3–0 Fall
3	Moïse Sambou (SEN)	2	0	2	0	0	0–4 ST	0–4 TO	—

Source: Official website

==== Pool 12 ====
Pos	Athlete	Pld	W	L	CP	TP	JPN	MGL	AUS
1	Kazuhiko Ikematsu (JPN)	2	2	0	7	12	—	4–0	8–0 Fall
2	Buyanjavyn Batzorig (MGL)	2	1	1	4	11	0–3 PO	—	11–0
3	Cory O'Brien (AUS)	2	0	2	0	0	0–4 TO	0–4 ST	—

Source: Official website

==== Pool 13 ====
Pos	Athlete	Pld	W	L	CP	TP	GRE	PUR	ISR	GUM
1	Nikolaos Loizidis (GRE)	3	3	0	10	29	—	13–9	5–3	11–0
2	Jonathan Rodríguez (PUR)	3	2	1	8	29	1–3 PP	—	6–4	14–4
3	Dumitru Socoliuc (ISR)	3	1	2	6	18	1–3 PP	1–3 PP	—	11–0
4	Melchor Manibusan (GUM)	3	0	3	1	4	0–4 ST	1–4 SP	0–4 ST	—

Source: Official website

=== Knockout round ===
Round of 16
Zhirayr Hovhannisyan (ARM)	1
Otar Tushishvili (GEO)	2
Serguei Rondón (CUB)	9
Ruslan Bodișteanu (MDA)	3
Štefan Fernyák (SVK)	5
Serafim Barzakov (BUL)	11
Gergő Szabó (HUN)	5
Evan MacDonald (CAN)	9
Elbrus Tedeyev (UKR)	5
Baek Jin-kuk (KOR)	1

Quarterfinals
Otar Tushishvili (GEO)	6
Serguei Rondón (CUB)	9
Serafim Barzakov (BUL)	5
Evan MacDonald (CAN)	1
Elbrus Tedeyev (UKR)	4
Irbek Farniev (RUS)	6
Kazuhiko Ikematsu (JPN)	6
Nikolaos Loizidis (GRE)	2

Semifinals
Serguei Rondón (CUB)	3
Serafim Barzakov (BUL)	4
Irbek Farniev (RUS)	10
Kazuhiko Ikematsu (JPN)	1

Final
Serafim Barzakov (BUL)	1
Irbek Farniev (RUS)	3
Bronze medal match
Serguei Rondón (CUB)	5
Kazuhiko Ikematsu (JPN)	6
