= 2005 World Wrestling Championships – Men's freestyle 66 kg =

Men's freestyle 66 kg at the 2005 World Championships
- Venue: László Papp Budapest Sports Arena
- Dates: 26 September 2005
- Competitors: 37 from 37 nations

Medalists
gold medal	Makhach Murtazaliev	Russia
silver medal	Serafim Barzakov	Bulgaria
bronze medal	Otar Tushishvili	Georgia
bronze medal	Geandry Garzón	Cuba

The men's freestyle 66 kilograms is a competition featured at the 2005 World Wrestling Championships, and was held at the László Papp Budapest Sports Arena in Budapest, Hungary on 26 September 2005.

== Results ==
Legend

- F — Won by fall

=== Finals ===
Semifinals			Final
Leonid Spiridonov (KAZ)	0	0
Serafim Barzakov (BUL)	1	4^{F}	Serafim Barzakov (BUL)	0	0
Makhach Murtazaliev (RUS)	4	3	Makhach Murtazaliev (RUS)	1	1
Geandry Garzón (CUB)	1	0

=== Top half ===
==== Section 1 ====
Round of 64

Round of 32
Vadim Guigolaev (FRA)	5	0	5
Richard Addinall (RSA)	0	1	1
Gábor Hatos (HUN)	1	1	0
Leonid Spiridonov (KAZ)	1	2	1
Evan MacDonald (CAN)	1	1
Chris Bono (USA)	1	1
Ricardo Roberty (VEN)	1	0
Ruslan Bodișteanu (MDA)	6	7

Round of 16
Vadim Guigolaev (FRA)	1	0
Leonid Spiridonov (KAZ)	3	1
Evan MacDonald (CAN)	0	7	7
Ruslan Bodișteanu (MDA)	2	0	0

Quarterfinals
Leonid Spiridonov (KAZ)	2	0	3
Evan MacDonald (CAN)	0	1	1

==== Section 2 ====
Round of 64

Round of 32
Peter Engelhardt (GER)	0	0
Otar Tushishvili (GEO)	2	1
Apostolos Taskoudis (GRE)	6	7
Mohamed Al-Qubaisi (UAE)	0	4
Masoud Vahedi (IRI)	1	0	1
Baek Jin-kuk (KOR)	0	1	0
Grégory Sarrasin (SUI)	0	0
Serafim Barzakov (BUL)	1	1

Round of 16
Otar Tushishvili (GEO)	3	2	4
Apostolos Taskoudis (GRE)	3	0	2
Masoud Vahedi (IRI)	1	2	1
Serafim Barzakov (BUL)	0	5	3

Quarterfinals
Otar Tushishvili (GEO)	0	3	0
Serafim Barzakov (BUL)	1	3	2

=== Bottom half ===
==== Section 3 ====
Round of 64

Round of 32
Viktor Bilokoputniy (UKR)	2	5
Pietro Piscitelli (ITA)	0	0
Elar Hani (EST)	0	0
László Szabolcs (ROM)	4	4
Fernando Iglesias (ARG)	1	0
Ömer Çubukçu (TUR)	7	3
Noruzbek Belekov (KGZ)	2	1
Makhach Murtazaliev (RUS)	5	3

Round of 16
Viktor Bilokoputniy (UKR)	4	3
László Szabolcs (ROM)	3	1
Ömer Çubukçu (TUR)	1	0
Makhach Murtazaliev (RUS)	3	5

Quarterfinals
Viktor Bilokoputniy (UKR)	3	0
Makhach Murtazaliev (RUS)	8	1

==== Section 4 ====
Round of 64
Rubén Díaz (ESP)	0	2
Dušan Babrnák (SVK)	3	3
Andreas Karaolis (CYP)	0	0
Gentian Balashi (AUS)	3	4
Mayeul Nganafio (CAF)	0	0
Buyanjavyn Batzorig (MGL)	7	7^{F}
Albert Batyrov (BLR)	1	1
Elman Asgarov (AZE)	0	0
Geandry Garzón (CUB)	4	2
Zhirayr Hovhannisyan (ARM)	3	0

Round of 32
Kazuhiko Ikematsu (JPN)	3	1
Li Quan (CHN)	0	0
Mazen Kadmani (SYR)	1	0	0
Dušan Babrnák (SVK)	0	1	1
Gentian Balashi (AUS)	0
Buyanjavyn Batzorig (MGL)	7^{F}
Albert Batyrov (BLR)	0	5	0
Geandry Garzón (CUB)	3	2	3

Round of 16
Kazuhiko Ikematsu (JPN)	2	2
Dušan Babrnák (SVK)	0	0
Buyanjavyn Batzorig (MGL)	2	1
Geandry Garzón (CUB)	3	2

Quarterfinals
Kazuhiko Ikematsu (JPN)	1	0
Geandry Garzón (CUB)	4	4^{F}

=== Repechage ===
Repechage round 2
Grégory Sarrasin (SUI)	0	1
Masoud Vahedi (IRI)	2	2
Noruzbek Belekov (KGZ)	0	0
Ömer Çubukçu (TUR)	5	2

Repechage round 3
Masoud Vahedi (IRI)	0	0
Otar Tushishvili (GEO)	1	3^{F}
Ömer Çubukçu (TUR)	0	0
Viktor Bilokoputniy (UKR)	3	3

Bronze medals
Otar Tushishvili (GEO)	2	2
Leonid Spiridonov (KAZ)	0	0
Viktor Bilokoputniy (UKR)	1	0
Geandry Garzón (CUB)	2	3
