= 2006 World Wrestling Championships – Men's freestyle 66 kg =

Men's freestyle 66 kg at the 2006 World Championships
- Venue: Tianhe Gymnasium
- Dates: 28 September 2006
- Competitors: 35 from 35 nations

Medalists
gold medal	Bill Zadick	United States
silver medal	Otar Tushishvili	Georgia
bronze medal	Geandry Garzón	Cuba
bronze medal	Andriy Stadnik	Ukraine

The men's freestyle 66 kilograms is a competition featured at the 2006 World Wrestling Championships, and was held at the Tianhe Gymnasium in Guangzhou, China on 28 September 2006.

== Results ==
Legend

- F — Won by fall

=== Finals ===
Semifinals				Final
Albert Batyrov (BLR)	1	0	1
Bill Zadick (USA)	0	1	2	Bill Zadick (USA)	1	3	1
Otar Tushishvili (GEO)	2	0	5	Otar Tushishvili (GEO)	2	0	0
Andriy Stadnik (UKR)	0	2	0

=== Top half ===
==== Section 1 ====
Round of 64

Round of 32
Nguyễn Doãn Dũng (VIE)	0
Sushil Kumar (IND)	4^{F}
Elman Asgarov (AZE)	7	6
Chab Loeun (CAM)	0	0
Buyanjavyn Batzorig (MGL)	3	1
Mustafa Kuyucu (TUR)	2	0
Albert Batyrov (BLR)	4	3
Pietro Piscitelli (ITA)	0	0

Round of 16
Sushil Kumar (IND)	4	1
Elman Asgarov (AZE)	3	4^{F}
Buyanjavyn Batzorig (MGL)	0	0
Albert Batyrov (BLR)	4	2

Quarterfinals
Elman Asgarov (AZE)	2	2	0
Albert Batyrov (BLR)	0	3	1

==== Section 2 ====
Round of 64

Round of 32
Baek Jin-kuk (KOR)	0	1
Geandry Garzón (CUB)	1	1
Bill Zadick (USA)	2	4
Elar Hani (EST)	0	0
Chi Yung-hsiang (TPE)	5^{F}
Jeton Anjain (MHL)	0
Grégory Sarrasin (SUI)	0	0
Fred Jessey (NGR)	2	1

Round of 16
Geandry Garzón (CUB)	0	4	1
Bill Zadick (USA)	4	1	3
Chi Yung-hsiang (TPE)	0	0
Fred Jessey (NGR)	2	5

Quarterfinals
Bill Zadick (USA)	2	2
Fred Jessey (NGR)	2	0

=== Bottom half ===
==== Section 3 ====
Round of 64

Round of 32
Cleopas Ncube (CAN)	0	3
Zhirayr Hovhannisyan (ARM)	4	4
Otar Tushishvili (GEO)	5	6
Anisim Talambat (MDA)	1	0
Jimmy Angana (PHI)	0	0
Arslan Khutaliev (UZB)	5	4
Serafim Barzakov (BUL)	2	0	2
Apostolos Taskoudis (GRE)	1	1	0

Round of 16
Zhirayr Hovhannisyan (ARM)	5	0	0
Otar Tushishvili (GEO)	0	3	1
Arslan Khutaliev (UZB)	0	2	1
Serafim Barzakov (BUL)	1	2	1

Quarterfinals
Otar Tushishvili (GEO)	1	2
Serafim Barzakov (BUL)	0	1

==== Section 4 ====
Round of 64
Takafumi Kojima (JPN)	6	6
Gentian Balashi (AUS)	0	0
Leonid Spiridonov (KAZ)	7	4
Zhou Shengyin (CHN)	0	3
Franson Gibbons (PLW)	0
Masoud Mostafa-Jokar (IRI)	9^{F}

Round of 32
Makhach Murtazaliev (RUS)	4	7
Mohamed Al-Qubaisi (UAE)	1	0
Dušan Babrnák (SVK)	0	0
Lulzim Vrenezi (MKD)	3	6
Andriy Stadnik (UKR)	3	7
Takafumi Kojima (JPN)	1	0
Leonid Spiridonov (KAZ)	3	3
Masoud Mostafa-Jokar (IRI)	1	0

Round of 16
Makhach Murtazaliev (RUS)	2	5
Lulzim Vrenezi (MKD)	0	1
Andriy Stadnik (UKR)	4	6
Leonid Spiridonov (KAZ)	1	0

Quarterfinals
Makhach Murtazaliev (RUS)	0	1	2
Andriy Stadnik (UKR)	3	1	3

=== Repechage ===
Repechage round 2
Elar Hani (EST)	0	0
Geandry Garzón (CUB)	7	2
Anisim Talambat (MDA)	0	1
Zhirayr Hovhannisyan (ARM)	2	5

Repechage round 3
Geandry Garzón (CUB)	5	4
Fred Jessey (NGR)	0	1
Zhirayr Hovhannisyan (ARM)	0	0
Serafim Barzakov (BUL)	6	1

Bronze medals
Geandry Garzón (CUB)	0	6	6
Albert Batyrov (BLR)	4	3	0
Serafim Barzakov (BUL)	1	0
Andriy Stadnik (UKR)	3	4^{F}
