= 2007 World Wrestling Championships – Men's freestyle 66 kg =

Men's freestyle 66 kg at the 2007 World Championships
- Venue: Heydar Aliyev Sports and Concert Complex
- Dates: 20 September 2007
- Competitors: 47 from 47 nations

Medalists
gold medal	Ramazan Şahin	Turkey
silver medal	Geandry Garzón	Cuba
bronze medal	Otar Tushishvili	Georgia
bronze medal	Irbek Farniev	Russia

The men's freestyle 66 kilograms is a competition featured at the 2007 World Wrestling Championships, and was held at the Heydar Aliyev Sports and Concert Complex in Baku, Azerbaijan on 20 September 2007.

== Results ==
Legend

- F — Won by fall
- WO — Won by walkover

=== Finals ===
Semifinals				Final
Geandry Garzón (CUB)	3	5	8
Otar Tushishvili (GEO)	5	0	2	Geandry Garzón (CUB)	0	3	2
Andriy Stadnik (UKR)	2	7	0	Ramazan Şahin (TUR)	1	0	3
Ramazan Şahin (TUR)	3	2	7

=== Top half ===
==== Section 1 ====
Round of 64

Round of 32
Geandry Garzón (CUB)	2	4
Husham Majeed (IRQ)	0	1
Buyanjavyn Batzorig (MGL)	6	7^{F}
Franson Gibbons (PLW)	0	0
Pedro Soto (PUR)	0	1	2
Adam Sobieraj (POL)	1	0	1
Doug Schwab (USA)	4	8
Gentian Balashi (AUS)	0	0

Round of 16
Geandry Garzón (CUB)	3	5
Buyanjavyn Batzorig (MGL)	1	2
Pedro Soto (PUR)	0	0
Doug Schwab (USA)	1	1

Quarterfinals
Geandry Garzón (CUB)	2	4
Doug Schwab (USA)	0	1

==== Section 2 ====
Round of 64

Round of 32
Vadim Guigolaev (FRA)	6	5^{F}
Manuel Ortiz (ESP)	2	2
Nikolay Paslar (BUL)	3	1
László Szabolcs (ROU)	0	0
Abdulkhakim Shapiyev (KAZ)	3	1
Li Quan (CHN)	0	0
Ramazan Abdurakhmanov (AZE)	2	1	0
Otar Tushishvili (GEO)	1	3	1

Round of 16
Vadim Guigolaev (FRA)	0	0
Nikolay Paslar (BUL)	1	1
Abdulkhakim Shapiyev (KAZ)	0	1
Otar Tushishvili (GEO)	1	1

Quarterfinals
Nikolay Paslar (BUL)	5	2	0
Otar Tushishvili (GEO)	1	3	1

=== Bottom half ===
==== Section 3 ====
Round of 64
Cleopas Ncube (CAN)	7^{F}
Pietro Piscitelli (ITA)	0
Meýlis Öwezgeldiýew (TKM)	0	0
Ricardo Roberty (VEN)	3	1
Elar Hani (EST)	0
Sushil Kumar (IND)	4^{F}
Yuriy Starostin (TJK)	1	1
Apostolos Taskoudis (GRE)	3	5
Cristian Nova (BOL)	0	0
Andriy Stadnik (UKR)	6	5
Martin Daum (GER)	7	4^{F}
Sabith Kalimasi (COD)	2	0
Ruslan Bodișteanu (MDA)	1	1
Grégory Sarrasin (SUI)	0	0

Round of 32
Bator Bazarov (KGZ)	5	0	4
Cleopas Ncube (CAN)	3	1	3
Ricardo Roberty (VEN)	0
Sushil Kumar (IND)	3^{F}
Apostolos Taskoudis (GRE)	0
Andriy Stadnik (UKR)	6^{F}
Martin Daum (GER)	3	0	0
Ruslan Bodișteanu (MDA)	0	2	2

Round of 16
Bator Bazarov (KGZ)	0	1
Sushil Kumar (IND)	6	3
Andriy Stadnik (UKR)	4	6
Ruslan Bodișteanu (MDA)	1	1

Quarterfinals
Sushil Kumar (IND)	4	0
Andriy Stadnik (UKR)	7	8^{F}

==== Section 4 ====
Round of 64
Ramazan Şahin (TUR)	4	3
Lulzim Vrenezi (MKD)	1	1
Mazen Kadmani (SYR)	0	1
Arslan Khutaliev (UZB)	4	3
Abdulqader Omar (QAT)	0	0
Takayuki Suzuki (JPN)	6	6^{F}
Mayeul Nganafio (CAF)	1	1
Yuri Poliak (ISR)	6	4
Irbek Farniev (RUS)	4	6
Ákos Wöller (HUN)	0	0
Jung Young-ho (KOR)	0	0
Albert Batyrov (BLR)	1	2
Iván Duque (COL)	0
Heinrich Barnes (RSA)	6^{F}
Zhirayr Hovhannisyan (ARM)	1	1
Hassan Tahmasebi (IRI)	1	1

Round of 32
Ramazan Şahin (TUR)	1	2
Arslan Khutaliev (UZB)	0	0
Takayuki Suzuki (JPN)	3	4
Yuri Poliak (ISR)	3	0
Irbek Farniev (RUS)	0	1	1
Albert Batyrov (BLR)	1	0	0
Heinrich Barnes (RSA)	2
Zhirayr Hovhannisyan (ARM)	7^{F}

Round of 16
Ramazan Şahin (TUR)	3	4
Takayuki Suzuki (JPN)	3	2
Irbek Farniev (RUS)	1	1
Zhirayr Hovhannisyan (ARM)	0	0

Quarterfinals
Ramazan Şahin (TUR)	1	6
Irbek Farniev (RUS)	0	1

=== Repechage ===
Repechage round 1
Lulzim Vrenezi (MKD)	0	0
Arslan Khutaliev (UZB)	1	2

Repechage round 2
~~Husham Majeed (IRQ)~~
Buyanjavyn Batzorig (MGL)	W	O
Arslan Khutaliev (UZB)	3	2
Takayuki Suzuki (JPN)	0	1

Repechage round 3
Buyanjavyn Batzorig (MGL)	2	0
Doug Schwab (USA)	3	1
Arslan Khutaliev (UZB)	0	0
Irbek Farniev (RUS)	1	1

Bronze medals
Doug Schwab (USA)	1	0
Otar Tushishvili (GEO)	4	1
Irbek Farniev (RUS)	7	3
Andriy Stadnik (UKR)	0	2
