= Wrestling at the 2004 Summer Olympics – Men's freestyle 66 kg =

Men's freestyle 66 kg at the Games of the XXVIII Olympiad
- Venue: Ano Liosia Olympic Hall
- Date: 27–28 August 2004
- Competitors: 21 from 21 nations

Medalists
1st place, gold medalist(s)		Elbrus Tedeyev	Ukraine
2nd place, silver medalist(s)		Jamill Kelly	United States
3rd place, bronze medalist(s)		Makhach Murtazaliev	Russia

The men's freestyle 66 kilograms at the 2004 Summer Olympics as part of the wrestling program were held at the Ano Liosia Olympic Hall, August 27 to August 28.

The competition held with an elimination system of three or four wrestlers in each pool, with the winners qualify for the quarterfinals, semifinals and final by way of direct elimination.

== Schedule ==
All times are Eastern European Summer Time (UTC+03:00)

Date	Time	Event
27 August 2004	09:30	Round 1
27 August 2004	09:30	Round 2
27 August 2004	17:30	Round 3
27 August 2004	17:30	Qualification
28 August 2004	09:30	Semifinals
28 August 2004	17:30	Finals

== Results ==
Legend

- WO — Won by walkover

=== Elimination pools ===
==== Pool 1 ====
Pos	Athlete	Pld	W	L	CP	TP	Qualification
1	Kazuhiko Ikematsu (JPN)	2	2	0	7	7	Knockout round
2	Baek Jin-kuk (KOR)	2	1	1	4	6	
3	Fred Jessey (NGR)	2	0	2	1	2	

Source: Official website

	Score		CP
Fred Jessey (NGR)	1–3	Baek Jin-kuk (KOR)	1–3 PP
Kazuhiko Ikematsu (JPN)	3–1 Fall	Fred Jessey (NGR)	4–0 TO
Baek Jin-kuk (KOR)	3–4	Kazuhiko Ikematsu (JPN)	1–3 PP

==== Pool 2 ====
Pos	Athlete	Pld	W	L	CP	TP	Qualification
1	Leonid Spiridonov (KAZ)	2	2	0	6	15	Knockout round
2	Serafim Barzakov (BUL)	2	1	1	5	15	
3	Evan MacDonald (CAN)	2	0	2	1	7	

Source: Official website

	Score		CP
Evan MacDonald (CAN)	0–11	Serafim Barzakov (BUL)	0–4 ST
Leonid Spiridonov (KAZ)	10–7	Evan MacDonald (CAN)	3–1 PP
Serafim Barzakov (BUL)	4–5	Leonid Spiridonov (KAZ)	1–3 PP

==== Pool 3 ====
Pos	Athlete	Pld	W	L	CP	TP	Qualification
1	Apostolos Taskoudis (GRE)	2	1	1	4 (Note: Tied on the number of wins by fall and superiority. Technical points were used to determine the pool winner. Kumar and Hovhannisyan were ranked by their head-to-head result: IND 3–1 ARM.)	16	Knockout round
2	Ramesh Kumar (IND)	2	1	1	4	11	
3	Zhirayr Hovhannisyan (ARM)	2	1	1	4	13	

Source: Official website
Notes:

	Score		CP
Apostolos Taskoudis (GRE)	10–8	Ramesh Kumar (IND)	3–1 PP
Zhirayr Hovhannisyan (ARM)	12–6	Apostolos Taskoudis (GRE)	3–1 PP
Ramesh Kumar (IND)	3–1	Zhirayr Hovhannisyan (ARM)	3–1 PP

==== Pool 4 ====
Pos	Athlete	Pld	W	L	CP	TP	Qualification
1	Elbrus Tedeyev (UKR)	2	2	0	7	8	Knockout round
2	Serguei Rondón (CUB)	2	1	1	5	12	
3	Otar Tushishvili (GEO)	2	0	2	0	0	

Source: Official website

	Score		CP
Serguei Rondón (CUB)	2–8	Elbrus Tedeyev (UKR)	1–3 PP
Otar Tushishvili (GEO)	0–10	Serguei Rondón (CUB)	0–4 ST
Elbrus Tedeyev (UKR)	WO	Otar Tushishvili (GEO)	4–0 PA

==== Pool 5 ====
Pos	Athlete	Pld	W	L	CP	TP	Qualification
1	Ömer Çubukçu (TUR)	2	2	0	6	8	Knockout round
2	Gábor Hatos (HUN)	2	1	1	4	4	
3	Štefan Fernyák (SVK)	2	0	2	2	2	

Source: Official website

	Score		CP
Štefan Fernyák (SVK)	1–5	Ömer Çubukçu (TUR)	1–3 PP
Gábor Hatos (HUN)	3–1	Štefan Fernyák (SVK)	3–1 PP
Ömer Çubukçu (TUR)	3–1	Gábor Hatos (HUN)	3–1 PP

==== Pool 6 ====
Pos	Athlete	Pld	W	L	CP	TP	Qualification
1	Makhach Murtazaliev (RUS)	2	2	0	6	12	Knockout round
2	Artur Tavkazakhov (UZB)	2	1	1	4	7	
3	Alireza Dabir (IRI)	2	0	2	1	4	

Source: Official website

	Score		CP
Makhach Murtazaliev (RUS)	4–0	Alireza Dabir (IRI)	3–0 PO
Artur Tavkazakhov (UZB)	2–8	Makhach Murtazaliev (RUS)	1–3 PP
Alireza Dabir (IRI)	4–5	Artur Tavkazakhov (UZB)	1–3 PP

==== Pool 7 ====
Pos	Athlete	Pld	W	L	CP	TP	Qualification
1	Jamill Kelly (USA)	2	2	0	6	6	Knockout round
2	Elman Asgarov (AZE)	2	1	1	4	9	
3	Ruslan Bodișteanu (MDA)	2	0	2	1	3	

Source: Official website

	Score		CP
Ruslan Bodișteanu (MDA)	3–7	Elman Asgarov (AZE)	1–3 PP
Jamill Kelly (USA)	3–0	Ruslan Bodișteanu (MDA)	3–0 PO
Elman Asgarov (AZE)	2–3	Jamill Kelly (USA)	1–3 PP

=== Knockout round ===
Qualification
Kazuhiko Ikematsu (JPN)	2
Leonid Spiridonov (KAZ)	3
Apostolos Taskoudis (GRE)	2
Elbrus Tedeyev (UKR)	6
Ömer Çubukçu (TUR)	0
Makhach Murtazaliev (RUS)	6

Semifinals
Leonid Spiridonov (KAZ)	2
Elbrus Tedeyev (UKR)	4
Makhach Murtazaliev (RUS)	1
Jamill Kelly (USA)	3

Gold medal match
Elbrus Tedeyev (UKR)	5
Jamill Kelly (USA)	1
Bronze medal match
Leonid Spiridonov (KAZ)	1
Makhach Murtazaliev (RUS)	2

Classification 5–6
Kazuhiko Ikematsu (JPN)	6
Apostolos Taskoudis (GRE)	4

== Final standing ==
Rank	Athlete
1st place, gold medalist(s)	Elbrus Tedeyev (UKR)
2nd place, silver medalist(s)	Jamill Kelly (USA)
3rd place, bronze medalist(s)	Makhach Murtazaliev (RUS)
4	Leonid Spiridonov (KAZ)
5	Kazuhiko Ikematsu (JPN)
6	Apostolos Taskoudis (GRE)
7	Ömer Çubukçu (TUR)
8	Serafim Barzakov (BUL)
9	Serguei Rondón (CUB)
10	Ramesh Kumar (IND)
11	Zhirayr Hovhannisyan (ARM)
12	Elman Asgarov (AZE)
13	Artur Tavkazakhov (UZB)
14	Baek Jin-kuk (KOR)
15	Gábor Hatos (HUN)
16	Štefan Fernyák (SVK)
17	Evan MacDonald (CAN)
18	Alireza Dabir (IRI)
19	Ruslan Bodișteanu (MDA)
20	Fred Jessey (NGR)
21	Otar Tushishvili (GEO)
