= Soviet and Russian results in men's freestyle wrestling =

Men's freestyle wrestling competition began in the Olympics in 1904. FILA began holding World Championships in men's freestyle in 1951. During Olympic years, FILA suspends the World Championships.

Tsarist Russia did not send freestyle wrestlers to the Olympics for the country authorities didn't recognize the sport back then (only Greco-Roman or French wrestling as it was known then was widely practised and contested in the Russian Empire.) The Soviet Union began competing in freestyle wrestling at the 1952 Summer Olympics. The Soviet Union boycotted the Olympics in 1984. After the collapse of the Soviet Union, most former Soviet republics competed as a single Unified Team in 1992, and competed separately thereafter.

== List of results by the Soviet Union and Russia in Men's Freestyle Wrestling at the Olympics and World Championships ==
=== 1904 ===
| Year | Team Finish | 47.6 kg | 52.2 kg | 56.7 kg | 61.2 kg | 65.8 kg | 71.7 kg | 71.7+ kg |
|---|---|---|---|---|---|---|---|---|
| 1904 | DNC | Team did not compete | | | | | | |

=== 1908 ===
| Year | Team Finish | 54 kg | 60.3 kg | 66.6 kg | 73 kg | 73+ kg |
|---|---|---|---|---|---|---|
| 1908 | DNC | Team did not compete | | | | |

=== 1920 ===
| Year | Team Finish | 60 kg | 67.5 kg | 75 kg | 82.5 kg | 82.5+ kg |
|---|---|---|---|---|---|---|
| 1920 | DNC | Team did not compete | | | | |

=== 1924–1936 ===
| Year | Team Finish | 56 kg | 61 kg | 66 kg | 72 kg | 79 kg | 87 kg | 87+ kg |
|---|---|---|---|---|---|---|---|---|
| 1924 | DNC | Team did not compete | | | | | | |
| 1928 | DNC | Team did not compete | | | | | | |
| 1932 | DNC | Team did not compete | | | | | | |
| 1936 | DNC | Team did not compete | | | | | | |

=== 1948–1968 ===
| Year | Team Finish | 52 kg | 57 kg | 62 kg (−1961), 63 kg (1962–1968) | 67 kg (−1961), 70 kg (1962–1968) | 73 kg (−1961), 78 kg (1962–1968) | 79 kg (−1961), 87 kg (1962–1968) | 87 kg (−1961), 97 kg (1962–1968) | 87+ kg (−1961), 97+ kg (1962–1968) |
|---|---|---|---|---|---|---|---|---|---|
| 1948 | DNC | Team did not compete | | | | | | | |
| 1949 | N/A | Event not held | | | | | | | |
| 1950 | N/A | Event not held | | | | | | | |
| 1951 | DNC | Team did not compete | | | | | | | |
| 1952 | 2nd | Sajadov, Georgi (4th) | Mamedbekov, Rashid (2nd) | No Placer, No Recorded Competitor | Jaltyrjan, Aram (4th) | No Placer, No Recorded Competitor | Tsimakuridze, David (1st) | Englas, August (4th) | Mekokishvili, Arsen (1st) |
| 1953 | N/A | Event not held | | | | | | | |
| 1954 | 1st | Tsalkalamanidze, Mirian (3rd) | Gigiadze, V. (4th) | Musashvili, Nikolai (3rd) | Gabaradze, Sergey (3rd) | Balavadze, Vakhtang (1st) | Kartoziya, Givi (5th) | Englas, August (1st) | Mekokishvili, Arsen (1st) |
| 1955 | N/A | Event not held | | | | | | | |
| 1956 | 3rd | Tsalkalamanidze, Mirian (1st) | Shakhov, Mikhail (3rd) | Salimulin, Linar (6th) | Bestayev, Alimbeg (3rd) | Balavadze, Vakhtang (3rd) | Skhirtladze, Georgi (3rd) | Kulayev, Boris (2nd) | Vykhristyuk, Ivan (6th) |
| 1957 | 2nd | Tsalkalamanidze, Mirian (2nd) | Arsenian, Vladimir (6th) | Mushekian, Norik (3rd) | Bestayev, Alimbeg (3rd) | Balavadze, Vakhtang (1st) | Skhirtladze, Georgi (2nd) | Kulayev, Boris (2nd) | Vykhristyuk, Ivan (4th) |
| 1958 | N/A | Event not held | | | | | | | |
| 1959 | 1st | Aliev, Ali (1st) | Arsenian, Vladimir (3rd) | Mushekian, Norik (4th) | Sinyavski, Vladimir (1st) | Balavadze, Vakhtang (2nd) | Skhirtladze, Georgi (1st) | Kulayev, Boris (6th) | Dzarasov, Savkuds (3rd) |
| 1960 | 3rd | Aliev, Ali (6th) | Shakhov, Mikhail (6th) | Rubashvili, Vladimir (3rd) | Sinyavski, Vladimir (2nd) | No Placer, No Recorded Competitor | Skhirtladze, Georgi (2nd) | Albul, Anatoli (3rd) | Dzarasov, Savkuds (3rd) |
| 1961 | 2nd | Aliev, Ali (1st) | No Placer, No Recorded Competitor | Rubashvili, Vladimir (1st) | Sinyavski, Vladimir (2nd) | Bekmurzov, Mikhail (2nd) | Gobedishvili, Goram (5th) | Gurevich, Boris (2nd) | Medved, Alexander (3rd) |
| 1962 | 1st | Aliev, Ali (1st) | No Placer, No Recorded Competitor | Khokhashvili, Nodar (4th) | Dzhganadze, Robert (2nd) | Bekmurzov, Mikhail (6th) | Gurevich, Boris (4th) | Medved, Alexander (1st) | Ivanytsky, Alexander (1st) |
| 1963 | 1st | Aliev, Ali (2nd) | Ibragimov, Aydin (1st) | No Placer, No Recorded Competitor | Beriashvili, Zarbeg (2nd) | Sagaradze, Guliko (1st) | Albul, Anatoli (2nd) | Medved, Alexander (1st) | Ivanytsky, Alexander (1st) |
| 1964 | 3rd | Aliev, Ali (4th) | Ibragimov, Aydin (3rd) | Khokhashvili, Nodar (3rd) | Beriashvili, Zarbeg (5th) | Sagaradze, Guliko (2nd) | No Placer, No Recorded Competitor | Medved, Alexander (1st) | Ivanytsky, Alexander (1st) |
| 1965 | 2nd | No Placer, No Recorded Competitor | Tedeyev, Elkan (6th) | No Placer, No Recorded Competitor | Beriashvili, Zarbeg (3rd) | Sagaradze, Guliko (1st) | Lomidze, Shota (4th) | Medved, Alexander (2nd) | Ivanytsky, Alexander (1st) |
| 1966 | 2nd | Alibegashvili, Tariel (5th) | Aliev, Ali (1st) | Tedeyev, Elkan (5th) | Beriashvili, Zarbeg (6th) | Sagaradze, Guliko (2nd) | Khovrebov, Andrei (5th) | Medved, Alexander (1st) | Ivanytsky, Alexander (1st) |
| 1967 | 1st | Albarian, Nazar (4th) | Aliev, Ali (1st) | Tedeyev, Elkan (2nd) | Beriashvili, Zarbeg (2nd) | Sagaradze, Guliko (2nd) | Gurevich, Boris (1st) | Lomidze, Shota (2nd) | Medved, Alexander (1st) |
| 1968 | 2nd | Albarian, Nazar (4th) | Aliev, Ali (4th) | Tedeyev, Elkan (6th) | Beriashvili, Zarbeg (5th) | Shakhmuradov, Youri (6th) | Gurevich, Boris (1st) | Lomidze, Shota (2nd) | Medved, Alexander (1st) |

=== 1969–1996 ===
| Year | Team Finish | 48 kg | 52 kg | 57 kg | 62 kg | 68 kg | 74 kg | 82 kg | 90 kg | 100 kg | 100+ kg (−1984), 130 kg (1985–1996) |
|---|---|---|---|---|---|---|---|---|---|---|---|
| 1969 | 1st | Dmitriev, Roman (2nd) | Alibegashvili, Tariel (3rd) | Malyan, Pavel (4th) | Abdulbekov, Zaglav (3rd) | Khokhashvili, Nodar (3rd) | Beriashvili, Zarbeg (1st) | No Placer, No Recorded Competitor | Gurevich, Boris (1st) | Lomidze, Shota (1st) | Medved, Alexander (1st) |
| 1970 | 1st | Dmitriev, Roman (3rd) | Nasrulaev, Nasrula (4th) | No Placer, No Recorded Competitor | Kvaelashvili, Givi (4th) | Nasrulaev, Nasrula (4th) | Khokhashvili, Nodar (4th) | Shakhmuradov, Youri (1st) | Strakhov, Gennady (1st) | Gulyutkin, Vladimir (1st) | Medved, Alexander (1st) |
| 1971 | 1st | Dmitriev, Roman (5th) | Nasrulaev, Nasrula (3rd) | Shatkov, V. (5th) | Abdulbekov, Zaglav (1st) | Kazakov, Vassili (2nd) | Gusov, Yury (1st) | Tediashvili, Levan (1st) | No Placer, No Recorded Competitor | Lomidze, Shota (1st) | Medved, Alexander (1st) |
| 1972 | 1st | Dmitriev, Roman (1st) | Alakhverdiyev, Arsen (2nd) | Kuleshov, Ivan (DNP) | Abdulbekov, Zaglav (1st) | Ashuraliyev, Ruslan (3rd) | Gusov, Yury (DNP) | Tediashvili, Levan (1st) | Strakhov, Gennady (2nd) | Yarygin, Ivan (1st) | Medved, Alexander (1st) |
| 1973 | 1st | Dmitriev, Roman (1st) | Alakhverdiyev, Arsen (2nd) | Yumin, Vladimir (3rd) | Abdulbekov, Zaglav (1st) | Nasrulaev, Nasrula (2nd) | Ashuraliyev, Ruslan (2nd) | Syulschin, Vassili (1st) | Tediashvili, Levan (1st) | Yarygin, Ivan (1st) | Andiyev, Soslan (1st) |
| 1974 | 1st | Hajiyev, Rafig (2nd) | Dmitriev, Roman (3rd) | Yumin, Vladimir (1st) | Gadzhiev, Batal (5th) | Nasrulaev, Nasrula (1st) | Ashuraliyev, Ruslan (1st) | Novozhilov, Viktor (1st) | Tediashvili, Levan (1st) | Gulyutkin, Vladimir (1st) | Andiyev, Soslan (2nd) |
| 1975 | 1st | Kharitonyuk, Anatoli (2nd) | Pashaev, Telman (2nd) | Yumin, Vladimir (2nd) | No Placer, No Recorded Competitor | Pinigin, Pavel (1st) | Ashuraliyev, Ruslan (1st) | No Placer, No Recorded Competitor | Tediashvili, Levan (1st) | Gulyutkin, Vladimir (3rd) | Andiyev, Soslan (1st) |
| 1976 | 1st | Dmitriev, Roman (2nd) | Ivanov, Alexander (2nd) | Yumin, Vladimir (1st) | Timofeyev, Sergei (6th) | Pinigin, Pavel (1st) | Ashuraliyev, Ruslan (4th) | Novozhilov, Viktor (2nd) | Tediashvili, Levan (1st) | Yarygin, Ivan (1st) | Andiyev, Soslan (1st) |
| 1977 | 1st | Beloglazov, Anatoli (1st) | No Placer, No Recorded Competitor | Alexeev, Viktor (2nd) | Yumin, Vladimir (1st) | Pinigin, Pavel (1st) | No Placer, No Recorded Competitor | Aratsilov, Magomedkhan (2nd) | Prokopchuk, Anatoli (1st) | Bisultanov, Aslanbek (1st) | Andiyev, Soslan (1st) |
| 1978 | 1st | Kornilayev, Sergei (1st) | Beloglazov, Anatoli (1st) | Ibragimov, Busay (2nd) | Yumin, Vladimir (1st) | Pinigin, Pavel (1st) | Marta, Pyotr (3rd) | Aratsilov, Magomedkhan (1st) | Prokopchuk, Anatoli (2nd) | Tediashvili, Levan (2nd) | Andiyev, Soslan (1st) |
| 1979 | 1st | Kornilayev, Sergei (1st) | Beloglazov, Anatoli (6th) | Beloglazov, Sergei (2nd) | Yumin, Vladimir (1st) | Charatschura, Mikhail (1st) | Petrenko, Nikolai (3rd) | Aratsilov, Magomedkhan (3rd) | Ortzsev, Khasan (1st) | Mate, Ilya (1st) | Khasimikov, Salman (1st) |
| 1980 | 1st | Kornilayev, Sergei (3rd) | Beloglazov, Anatoli (1st) | Beloglazov, Sergei (1st) | Abushev, Magomedgasan (1st) | Absaidov, Saipulla (1st) | Pinigin, Pavel (4th) | Aratsilov, Magomedkhan (1st) | Oganisyan, Sanasar (1st) | Mate, Ilya (1st) | Andiyev, Soslan (1st) |
| 1981 | 1st | Kornilayev, Sergei (1st) | No Placer, No Recorded Competitor | Beloglazov, Sergei (1st) | Alexeev, Viktor (3rd) | Absaidov, Saipulla (1st) | No Placer, No Recorded Competitor | Danko, Grigori (3rd) | Oganisyan, Sanasar (1st) | Mate, Ilya (3rd) | Khasimikov, Salman (1st) |
| 1982 | 1st | Kornilayev, Sergei (1st) | Efendiev, Osman (2nd) | Beloglazov, Anatoli (1st) | Beloglazov, Sergei (1st) | Charatschura, Mikhail (1st) | Vorobiev, Yuri (3rd) | Dsgoev, Taymuraz (1st) | Batnia, Viktor (3rd) | Mate, Ilya (1st) | Khasimikov, Salman (1st) |
| 1983 | 1st | Dorshu, Alexander (2nd) | Beloglazov, Anatoli (3rd) | Beloglazov, Sergei (1st) | Alexeev, Viktor (1st) | Fadzaev, Arsen (1st) | Magomadov, Taram (2nd) | Dsgoev, Taymuraz (1st) | Naniev, Petr (1st) | Khadartsev, Aslan (1st) | Khasimikov, Salman (1st) |
| 1984 | DNC | Team did not compete | | | | | | | | | |
| 1985 | 1st | Gogolev, Vassili (3rd) | Daibov, Minatulla (2nd) | Beloglazov, Sergei (1st) | Alexeev, Viktor (1st) | Fadzaev, Arsen (1st) | Dyugutov, Vladimir (4th) | Tambouvtsev, Alexander (3rd) | Tibilov, Robert (4th) | Khabelov, Leri (1st) | Gobezhishvili, David (1st) |
| 1986 | 1st | Kushnir, Mikhail (3rd) | Toguzov, Vladimir (6th) | Beloglazov, Sergei (1st) | Issaev, Khazar (1st) | Fadzaev, Arsen (1st) | Varayev, Adlan (2nd) | Modosian, Vladimir (1st) | Khadartsev, Makharbek (1st) | Khadartsev, Aslan (1st) | Gobezhishvili, David (2nd) |
| 1987 | 1st | Karamchakov, Sergey (3rd) | Toguzov, Vladimir (4th) | Beloglazov, Sergei (1st) | Issaev, Khazar (2nd) | Fadzaev, Arsen (1st) | Varayev, Adlan (1st) | Modosian, Vladimir (3rd) | Khadartsev, Makharbek (1st) | Khabelov, Leri (1st) | Khadartsev, Aslan (1st) |
| 1988 | 1st | Karamchakov, Sergey (3rd) | Toguzov, Vladimir (3rd) | Beloglazov, Sergei (1st) | Sarkisyan, Stepan (2nd) | Fadzaev, Arsen (1st) | Varayev, Adlan (2nd) | Tambouvtsev, Alexander (4th) | Khadartsev, Makharbek (1st) | Khabelov, Leri (2nd) | Gobezhishvili, David (1st) |
| 1989 | 1st | Medshlumyan, Gnel (3rd) | Toguzov, Vladimir (2nd) | No Placer, No Recorded Competitor | Sarkisyan, Stepan (6th) | Budaev, Boris (1st) | Fadzaev, Arsen (2nd) | Jabrailov, Elmadi (1st) | Khadartsev, Makharbek (1st) | Atavov, Ahmed (1st) | Khadartsev, Aslan (3rd) |
| 1990 | 1st | No Placer, No Recorded Competitor | Agaev, Aslan (3rd) | Smal, Sergey (3rd) | Rashidov, Gadzhi (3rd) | Fadzaev, Arsen (1st) | Gadzhikhanov, Nasir (2nd) | Gogolishvili, Avtandil (4th) | Khadartsev, Makharbek (1st) | Khabelov, Leri (1st) | Gobezhishvili, David (1st) |
| 1991 | 1st | Oroudjov, Vougar (1st) | Toguzov, Vladimir (3rd) | Smal, Sergey (1st) | Rashidov, Gadzhi (3rd) | Fadzaev, Arsen (1st) | Gadzhikhanov, Nasir (3rd) | Katinovasov, Rasul (4th) | Khadartsev, Makharbek (1st) | Khabelov, Leri (1st) | Shiltsov, Gennadi (2nd) |
| 1992 | 1st | Oroudjov, Vougar (3rd) | Toguzov, Vladimir (11th) | Smal, Sergey (2nd) | Azizov, Magomed (5th) | Fadzaev, Arsen (1st) | Gadzhiev, Magomed (4th) | Jabrailov, Elmadi (2nd) | Khadartsev, Makharbek (1st) | Khabelov, Leri (1st) | Gobezhishvili, David (3rd) |
| 1993 | 2nd | No Placer, No Recorded Competitor | Sambalov, Sergey (3rd) | Beloglazov, Sergei (DNP) | No Placer, No Recorded Competitor | Bogiyev, Vadim (2nd) | No Placer, No Recorded Competitor | Katinovasov, Sagid (2nd) | Khadartsev, Makharbek (3rd) | Khabelov, Leri (1st) | Shumilin, Andrei (3rd) |
| 1994 | 2nd | Yumshanov, Peter (3rd) | Davudov, Sultan (11th) | Bagautdin Umakhanov (3rd) | Azizov, Magomed (1st) | Bogiyev, Vadim (7th) | Gadzhikhanov, Nasir (5th) | Kelekhsaev, Rustam (11th) | Khadartsev, Makharbek (2nd) | Musulbes, David (3rd) | Shumilin, Andrei (11th) |
| 1995 | 3rd | Oroudjov, Vougar (1st) | Tchetchen-ool, Mongouch (8th) | Azizov, Abdulaziz (29th) | Azizov, Magomed (3rd) | Bogiyev, Vadim (4th) | Saitiev, Buvaisar (1st) | Albegov, Stanislav (8th) | Khadartsev, Makharbek (2nd) | Musulbes, David (11th) | Khabelov, Leri (3rd) |
| 1996 | 2nd | Oroudjov, Vougar (4th) | Tchetchen-ool, Mongouch (4th) | Bagautdin Umakhanov (11th) | Azizov, Magomed (5th) | Bogiyev, Vadim (1st) | Saitiev, Buvaisar (1st) | Magomedov, Khadzhimurad (1st) | Khadartsev, Makharbek (2nd) | Khabelov, Leri (14th) | Shumilin, Andrei (4th) |

=== 1997–2001 ===
| Year | Team Finish | 54 kg | 58 kg | 63 kg | 69 kg | 76 kg | 85 kg | 97 kg | 130 kg |
|---|---|---|---|---|---|---|---|---|---|
| 1997 | 1st | Molonov, Maxim (5th) | Oumakhanov, Mourad (4th) | Azizov, Magomed (3rd) | Saitiev, Adam (6th) | Saitiev, Buvaisar (1st) | Magomedov, Khadzhimurad (4th) | Kuramagomedov, Kuramagomed (1st) | Musulbes, David (3rd) |
| 1998 | 2nd | Tchetchen-ool, Mongouch (5th) | Oumakhanov, Mourad (5th) | Azizov, Magomed (6th) | Allakhverdiev, Velikhan (7th) | Saitiev, Buvaisar (1st) | Magomedov, Khadzhimurad (4th) | Kuramagomedov, Kuramagomed (3rd) | Shumilin, Andrey (3rd) |
| 1999 | 1st | Chuchunov, Leonid (6th) | Dzadzaev, Miron (6th) | Oumakhanov, Shamil (18th) | Osmanov, Mourad (26th) | Saitiev, Adam (1st) | Magomedov, Khadzhimurad (2nd) | Murtazaliev, Sagid (1st) | Shumilin, Andrey (2nd) |
| 2000 | 1st | Chuchunov, Leonid (12th) | Ramazanov, Mourad (7th) | Oumakhanov, Mourad (1st) | Gitinov, Arsen (2nd) | Saitiev, Buvaisar (9th) | Saitiev, Adam (1st) | Murtazaliev, Sagid (1st) | Musulbes, David (1st) |
| 2001 | 1st | Kontoev, Alexander (3rd) | Huseynov, Zelimkhan (8th) | Tomaev, Soslan (27th) | Farniev, Irbek (15th) | Saitiev, Buvaisar (1st) | Magomedov, Khadzhimurad (1st) | Gogshelidze, Georgi (1st) | Musulbes, David (1st) |

=== 2002–2013 ===
| Year | Team Finish | 55 kg | 60 kg | 66 kg | 74 kg | 84 kg | 96 kg | 120 kg |
|---|---|---|---|---|---|---|---|---|
| 2002 | 2nd | Kontoev, Alexander (14th) | Petrov, Prikopbi (13th) | Botayev, Zaur (3rd) | Isagadzhiev, Magomed (2nd) | Saitiev, Adam (1st) | Gogshelidze, Georgi (6th) | Musulbes, David (1st) |
| 2003 | 4th | Batirov, Mavlet (14th) | Ustarkhanov, Kamal (11th) | Farniev, Irbek (1st) | Saitiev, Buvaisar (1st) | Sazhidov, Sazhid (1st) | Tigiev, Taimuraz (14th) | Kuramagomedov, Kuramagomed (17th) |
| 2004 | 1st | Batirov, Mavlet (1st) | Oumakhanov, Mourad (10th) | Murtazaliev, Makhach (3rd) | Saitiev, Buvaisar (1st) | Sazhidov, Sazhid (3rd) | Gatsalov, Khadjimourat (1st) | Kuramagomedov, Kuramagomed (6th) |
| 2005 | 1st | Kutseev, Zalimkhan (9th) | Dudayev, Alan (1st) | Murtazaliev, Makhach (1st) | Saitiev, Buvaisar (1st) | Sazhidov, Sazhid (5th) | Gatsalov, Khadjimourat (1st) | Kuramagomedov, Kuramagomed (5th) |
| 2006 | 1st | Kudukhov, Besik (2nd) | Batirov, Mavlet (3rd) | Murtazaliev, Makhach (9th) | Saitiev, Buvaisar (8th) | Sazhidov, Sazhid (1st) | Gatsalov, Khadjimourat (1st) | Kuramagomedov, Kuramagomed (2nd) |
| 2007 | 1st | Kudukhov, Besik (1st) | Batirov, Mavlet (1st) | Farniev, Irbek (3rd) | Murtazaliev, Makhach (1st) | Ketoyev, Georgy (1st) | Gatsalov, Khadjimourat (1st) | Makhov, Beylal (1st) |
| 2008 | 1st | Kudukhov, Besik (3rd) | Batirov, Mavlet (1st) | Farniev, Irbek (7th) | Saitiev, Buvaisar (1st) | Ketoyev, Georgy (3rd) | Muradov, Shirvani (1st) | Akhmedov, Bakhtiyar (1st) |
| 2009 | 1st | Lebedev, Viktor (3rd) | Kudukhov, Besik (1st) | Djukayev, Rasul (2nd) | Tsargush, Denis (1st) | Gadisov, Abdusalam (5th) | Gatsalov, Khadjimourat (1st) | Makhov, Beylal (1st) |
| 2010 | 1st | Lebedev, Viktor (1st) | Kudukhov, Besik (1st) | Gogayev, Alan (2nd) | Tsargush, Denis (1st) | Ktsoyev, Soslan (3rd) | Gatsalov, Khadjimourat (2nd) | Makhov, Beylal (1st) |
| 2011 | 1st | Lebedev, Viktor (1st) | Kudukhov, Besik (1st) | Batirov, Adam (5th) | Tsargush, Denis (11th) | Saritov, Albert (3rd) | Gatsalov, Khadjimourat (11th) | Makhov, Beylal (2nd) |
| 2012 | 1st | Otarsultanov, Djamal (1st) | Kudukhov, Besik (DQ) | Gogayev, Alan (16th) | Tsargush, Denis (3rd) | Urishev, Anzor (8th) | Gadisov, Abdusalam (9th) | Makhov, Beylal (3rd) |
| 2013 | 2nd | Israpilov, Nariman (3rd) | Goygereyev, Bekkhan (1st) | Kurbanaliev, Magomed (3rd) | Khubezhty, Kakhaber (26th) | Kudiyamagomedov, Shamil (15th) | Boltukaev, Anzor (3rd) | Gatsalov, Khadjimourat (1st) |

=== 2014–2017 ===
| Year | Team Finish | 57 kg | 61 kg | 65 kg | 70 kg | 74 kg | 86 kg | 97 kg | 125 kg |
|---|---|---|---|---|---|---|---|---|---|
| 2014 | 1st | Lebedev, Viktor (9th) | Bogomoev, Aleksandr (9th) | Ramonov, Soslan (1st) | Tsabolov, Khetag (1st) | Tsargush, Denis (1st) | Sadulaev, Abdulrashid (1st) | Gadisov, Abdusalam (1st) | Gatsalov, Khadjimourat (3rd) |
| 2015 | 1st | Lebedev, Viktor (3rd) | Bogomoev, Aleksandr (11th) | Ramonov, Soslan (3rd) | Gazimagomedov, Magomedrasul (1st) | Geduev, Aniuar (3rd) | Sadulaev, Abdulrashid (1st) | Gadisov, Abdusalam (2nd) | Makhov, Bilyal (3rd) |
| 2016 | 1st | Lebedev, Viktor (9th) | Chakaev, Akhmed (3rd) | Ramonov, Soslan (1st) | Kurbanaliev, Magomed (1st) | Geduev, Aniuar (2nd) | Sadulaev, Abdulrashid (1st) | Boltukaev, Anzor (11th) | Makhov, Bilyal (13th) |
| 2017 | 2nd | Uguev, Zaur (23rd) | Rashidov, Gadzhimurad (2nd) | Gogayev, Alan (3rd) | Kadimagomedov, Magomedkhabib (7th) | Tsabolov, Khetag (2nd) | Valiev, Vladislav (3rd) | Sadulaev, Abdulrashid (2nd) | Khizriev, Anzor (5th) |

- Note- 61 kg and 70 kg were non-Olympic weights and were therefore wrestled at the 2016 World Wrestling Championships in Budapest, Hungary on December 10–11, 2016.

=== 2018– ===
| Year | Team Finish | 57 kg | 61 kg | 65 kg | 70 kg | 74 kg | 79 kg | 86 kg | 92 kg | 97 kg | 125 kg |
|---|---|---|---|---|---|---|---|---|---|---|---|
| 2018 | 1st | Uguev, Zaur (1st) | Rashidov, Gadzhimurad (2nd) | Chakaev, Akhmed (3rd) | Gazimagomedov, Magomedrasul (1st) | Sidakov, Zaurbek (1st) | Gadzhimagomedov, Akhmed (3rd) | Kurugliev, Dauren (5th) | Tsakulov, Batyrbek (7th) | Sadulaev, Abdulrashid (1st) | Khizriev, Anzor (5th) |
| 2019 | 1st | Uguev, Zaur (1st) | Idrisov, Magomedrasul (2nd) | Rashidov, Gadzhimurad (1st) | Baev, David (1st) | Sidakov, Zaurbek (1st) | Nabiev, Gadzhi (3rd) | Naifonov, Artur (3rd) | Zhabrailov, Alikhan (3rd) | Sadulaev, Abdulrashid (1st) | Khugaev, Alan (11th) |

== Statistics ==
=== Medalists by weight, 1904–2010 ===
| Category | 60 kg and below | 61–70 kg | 71–87 kg | more than 87 kg |
|---|---|---|---|---|
| Total weight classes contested at international championships | 153 | 130 | 144 | 139 |
| Weights in which URS/RUS medaled | 86 | 69 | 82 | 117 |
| Weights in which URS/RUS won championships | 37 | 36 | 45 | 84 |
| Percentage of medals won by URS/RUS | 56.2 | 53.1 | 56.9 | 84.2 |
| Percentage of championship titles won by URS/RUS | 24.2 | 27.7 | 31.3 | 60.4 |

=== Medalists by era ===
| Category | 1904–1936 | 1948–1968 | 1969–1996 | 1997–2010 |
|---|---|---|---|---|
| Total weight classes contested at international championships | 45 | 128 | 280 | 103 |
| Weight classes in which URS/RUS medaled | N/A | 73 | 213 | 68 |
| Weight classes in which URS/RUS won championships | N/A | 31 | 127 | 44 |
| Percentage of medals won by URS/RUS | N/A | 57.0 | 76.1 | 66.0 |
| Percentage of championship titles won by URS/RUS | N/A | 24.2 | 45.4 | 42.7 |

=== Average performances by era ===
| Category | 1904–1936 | 1948–1968 | 1969–1996 | 1997–2010 |
|---|---|---|---|---|
| Weight classes known to be contested by URS/RUS wrestlers | N/A | 103 | 255 | 103 |
| Number of known URS/RUS wrestlers | N/A | 42 | 106 | 46 |
| Average number of international championship appearances per wrestler | N/A | 2.45 | 2.41 | 2.24 |
| Medalists' average number of international championship appearances until first medal | N/A | 1.10 | 1.08 | 1.20 |
| Champions' average number of international championship appearances until first title | N/A | 1.50 | 1.58 | 1.55 |
| Average number of medals ultimately won by URS/RUS medalists | N/A | 2.43 | 2.42 | 2.27 |
| Average number of championships ultimately won by URS/RUS champions | N/A | 2.21 | 2.44 | 2.20 |

== See also ==
- United States results in men's freestyle wrestling
- List of World and Olympic Champions in men's freestyle wrestling
- List of Cadet, Junior, and Espoir World Champions in men's freestyle wrestling
- Iranian results in men's freestyle wrestling
