= Alireza Dabir =

President of Iran Wrestling Federation

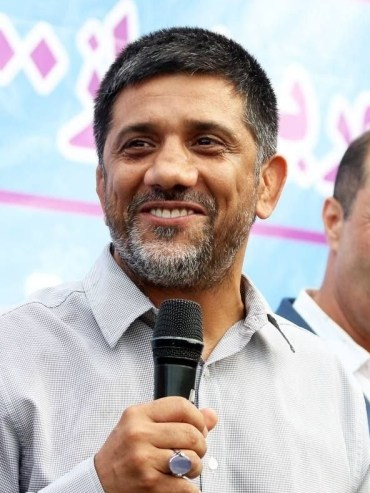
- Dabir in 2025

Member of City Council of Tehran
- In office 29 April 2007 – 22 August 2017
- Majority: 400,677 (17.86%)

Personal details
- Born: September 16, 1977 (age 48) Rey, Iran
- Party: Progress and Justice Population of Islamic Iran
- Education: Allameh Tabataba'i University
- Sports career
- Country: Iran
- Sport: Freestyle wrestling
Medal record
Olympic Games
Gold medal – first place	2000 Sydney	58 kg
World Championships
Gold medal – first place	1998 Tehran	58 kg
Silver medal – second place	1999 Ankara	58 kg
Silver medal – second place	2001 Sofia	63 kg
Silver medal – second place	2002 Tehran	66 kg
Asian Games
Silver medal – second place	2002 Busan	66 kg
World Junior Championships
Gold medal – first place	1994 Budapest	50 kg
Gold medal – first place	1997 Helsinki	56 kg

Alireza Dabir (Persian: علیرضا دبیر, born September 16, 1977) is the President of Islamic Republic of Iran Wrestling Federation since July 2019. He is an Iranian champion freestyle wrestler. Dabir won a gold medal at the 2000 Olympic Games in Sydney, as well as the World Championship in 1998. He was a runner-up in 1999, 2001 and 2002. In the 2004 Athens Olympics, Dabir lost all of his matches by points. He was a member of City Council of Tehran.

== Freestyle results ==
World Championships/Olympic Games Matches
Res.	Record	Opponent	Score	Date	Event	Location	Notes
Loss	24-7	(Uzbekistan) Artur Tavkazakhov	4-5	2004-08-26	Olympic Games	(Greece) Athens	
Loss	24-6	(Russia) Makhach Murtazaliev	0-4	2004-08-26	Olympic Games	(Greece) Athens	
Loss	24-5	(Estonia) Ahto Raska	-	2003-09-12	World Championships	(United States) New York City	Withdraw
Loss	24-4	(Bulgaria) Serafim Barzakov	2-4	2003-09-12	World Championships	(United States) New York City	
Loss	24-3	(Ukraine) Elbrus Tedeyev	4-5	2002-09-05	World Championships	(Iran) Tehran	
Win	24-2	(Russia) Zaur Botaev	2-1	2002-09-05	World Championships	(Iran) Tehran	
Win	23-2	(Canada) Neal Ewers	4-1	2002-09-05	World Championships	(Iran) Tehran	
Win	22-2	(Japan) Kazuhiko Ikematsu	6-4	2002-09-05	World Championships	(Iran) Tehran	
Win	21-2	(China) Chuan Li	9-2	2002-09-05	World Championships	(Iran) Tehran	66 kg debut
Loss	20-2	(Bulgaria) Serafim Barzakov	1-3	2001-11-22	World Championships	(Bulgaria) Sofia	Gold Medal Match
Win	20-1	(Turkey) Mehmet Yozgat	3-0	2001-11-22	World Championships	(Bulgaria) Sofia	
Win	19-1	(United States) Bill Zadick	9-2	2001-11-22	World Championships	(Bulgaria) Sofia	
Win	18-1	(India) Mukesh Kumar	10-0	2001-11-22	World Championships	(Bulgaria) Sofia	
Win	17-1	(Moldova) Ruslan Bodișteanu	4-3	2001-11-22	World Championships	(Bulgaria) Sofia	
Win	16-1	(Peru) Jose Luis Paico	10-0	2001-11-22	World Championships	(Bulgaria) Sofia	63 kg debut
Win	15-1	(Ukraine) Evgeni Buslovich	3-0	2000-09-28	Olympic Games	(Australia) Sydney	Wins Gold Medal
Win	14-1	(United States) Terry Brands	6-4	2000-09-28	Olympic Games	(Australia) Sydney	
Win	13-1	(Mongolia) Purevbaatar Oyunbuleg	5-2	2000-09-28	Olympic Games	(Australia) Sydney	
Win	12-1	(Canada) Guivi Sissaouri	3-0	2000-09-28	Olympic Games	(Australia) Sydney	
Win	11-1	(Guinea-Bissau) Talata Embalo	10-0	2000-09-28	Olympic Games	(Australia) Sydney	
Loss	10-1	(Turkey) Harun Doğan	1-3	1999-10-07	World Championships	(Turkey) Ankara	Gold Medal Match
Win	10-0	(Uzbekistan) Damir Zakhartinov	3-0	1999-10-07	World Championships	(Turkey) Ankara	
Win	9-0	(Slovakia) Andrej Fašánek	5-0	1999-10-07	World Championships	(Turkey) Ankara	
Win	8-0	(Mongolia) Purevbaatar Oyunbuleg	4-2	1999-10-07	World Championships	(Turkey) Ankara	
Win	7-0	(Ukraine) Evgeni Buslovich	2-1	1999-10-07	World Championships	(Turkey) Ankara	
Win	6-0	(Azerbaijan) Arif Abdullaev	4-1	1999-10-07	World Championships	(Turkey) Ankara	
Win	5-0	(Turkey) Harun Doğan	2-2	1998-09-07	World Championships	(Iran) Tehran	Wins Gold Medal
Win	4-0	(Kyrgyzstan) Rouslan Madyinov	8-3	1998-09-07	World Championships	(Iran) Tehran	
Win	3-0	(Poland) Tadeusz Kowalski	12-0	1998-09-07	World Championships	(Iran) Tehran	
Win	2-0	(South Korea) Jin-Hyuk Jung	3-2	1998-09-07	World Championships	(Iran) Tehran	
Win	1-0	(China) Fan Zhang	7-0	1998-09-07	World Championships	(Iran) Tehran	58 kg
