= Artur Tavkazakhov =

Uzbekistani wrestler (born 1976)

Personal information
- Full name: Artur Tavkazakhov
- Nationality: Uzbekistan
- Born: 30 June 1976 (age 50) Tashkent, Uzbek SSR, Soviet Union
- Height: 1.74 m (5 ft 8 1/2 in)
- Weight: 66 kg (146 lb)

Sport
- Style: Freestyle
- Club: Uzbek National Wrestling Team
- Coach: Kazbek Debagaev

Artur Tavkazakhov (Uzbek: Артур Тавказахов; born 30 June 1976) is a retired amateur Uzbek freestyle wrestler, who competed in the men's welterweight category. He represented his nation Uzbekistan at the 2004 Summer Olympics, and also trained and competed as a member of the Uzbek National Wrestling Team under his personal coach Kazbek Debagaev.

Tavkazakhov qualified for the Uzbek squad in the men's 66 kg class at the 2004 Summer Olympics in Athens. Earlier in the process, he placed second behind neighboring Kazakhstan's Leonid Spiridonov in the same category from the Olympic Qualification Tournament in Bratislava, Slovakia. He lost his opening match 2–8 to eventual Olympic bronze medalist Makhach Murtazaliev, but bounced back to thrash Iran's Alireza Dabir with a rigid 3–2 decision. Placing second in the prelim pool and thirteenth overall, Tavkazakhov failed to advance to the quarterfinals.
