= Fred Jessey =

Nigerian freestyle wrestler

Personal information
- Full name: Fred Jessey
- Nationality: Nigeria
- Born: 3 September 1977 (age 48) Yenagoa, Bayelsa, Nigeria
- Height: 1.80 m (5 ft 11 in)
- Weight: 66 kg (146 lb)

Sport
- Style: Freestyle
- Club: Bayelsa Wrestling Club
- Coach: Jackson Bidei
Medal record
Men's freestyle wrestling
Representing Nigeria
Commonwealth Games
Bronze medal – third place	2002 Manchester	66 kg
All-Africa Games
Gold medal – first place	2003 Abuja	66 kg
Silver medal – second place	1999 Johannesburg	69 kg
Silver medal – second place	2007 Algiers	66 kg

Fred Jessey (born 3 September 1977 in Yenagoa, Bayelsa) is a retired amateur Nigerian freestyle wrestler, who competed in the men's welterweight category. He represented his nation Nigeria at the 2004 Summer Olympics and produced a remarkable tally of four career medals, including a bronze in the 66-kg division at the 2002 Commonwealth Games in Manchester, England and a welterweight title at the 2003 All-Africa Games in Abuja. Jessey also trained for his native Bayelsa State's wrestling club under his personal coach Jackson Bidei.

Jessey made sporting headlines at the 2002 Commonwealth Games in Manchester, England, where he grappled his way over New Zealand's Ricardo Aryan to clinch the bronze in the 66-kg division. Following his immediate sporting success, Jessey went on to celebrate a boastful victory for the Nigerians, as he beat Algeria's Farid Hanoun for the gold in the same class at the 2003 All-Africa Games in Abuja.

At the 2004 Summer Olympics in Athens, Jessey qualified for the Nigerian squad, as a lone wrestler, in the men's welterweight class (66 kg). Earlier in the process, he placed sixth at the Olympic Qualification Tournament in Sofia, Bulgaria, but managed to fill up an entry by the International Federation of Association Wrestling through a tripartite invitation. Jessey lost his opening match 1–3 to South Korea's Baek Jin-kuk, and then lost to Japan's Kazuhiko Ikematsu on a pin with a minute remaining; he was ranked penultimate out of 22 wrestlers in the final standings.
