= Tushishvili =

Tushishvili is a surname. Notable people with the surname include:

- Guram Tushishvili (born 1995), Georgian judoka
- Otar Tushishvili (born 1978), Georgian wrestler
