= Zadick =

Zadick is a surname. Notable people with the surname include:

- Bill Zadick (born 1973), American wrestler
- Mike Zadick (born 1978), American wrestler, brother of Bill
