= Serguei Rondón =

Cuban freestyle wrestler (born 1979)

Personal information
- Full name: Serguei Rondón Pedroso
- Born: 28 October 1979 (age 46) Havana, Cuba
- Height: 1.70 m (5 ft 7 in)
- Weight: 66 kg (146 lb)

Sport
- Style: Freestyle
- Club: Cerro Pelado
- Coach: Filiberto Delgado
Medal record
Men's freestyle wrestling
Representing Cuba
Pan American Games
Gold medal – first place	2003 Santo Domingo	66 kg

Serguei Rondón Pedroso (Note: In this Spanish name, the first or paternal surname is Rondón and the second or maternal family name is Pedroso.) (born 28 October 1979) is a retired amateur Cuban freestyle wrestler, who competed in the men's welterweight category. He won the gold medal in the 66-kg division at the 2003 Pan American Games in Santo Domingo, Dominican Republic, and was later selected to the Cuban team for the 2004 Summer Olympics in Athens. Throughout his sporting career, Rondon trained for the wrestling team at Cerro Pelado Sports Club in Havana, under his personal coach and mentor Filiberto Delgado.

Rondon emerged himself into the global scene at the 2003 Pan American Games in Santo Domingo, Dominican Republic, where he pinned Colombia's Edison Hurtado on his final match to take home the gold medal in the men's welterweight division. Despite his early success from the Games, Rondon continued to reach the summit of the world rankings at the 2003 World Wrestling Championships in New York City, United States, but nearly missed out the podium after he lost the bronze medal match against Japan's Kazuhiko Ikematsu.

At the 2004 Summer Olympics in Athens, Rondon qualified for the Cuban team in the men's 66 kg class by receiving a berth and placing fourth from the World Championships. He lost his opening match to Ukraine's Elbrus Tedeyev, who later claimed an Olympic gold at the end of the tournament, but managed to subdue Georgia's Otar Tushishvili with a ten-point technical fall, that left his opponent frail and injured. Finishing second in the prelim pool and ninth overall in the final standings, Rondon's performance was not enough to put him through into the quarterfinals.
