= Irbek Farniev =

Russian freestyle wrestler

Personal information
- Native name: Ирбек Валентинович Фарниев
- Full name: Irbek Valentinovich Farniev
- Nationality: Russia
- Born: 12 January 1980 (age 46) Vladikavkaz, Russia
- Height: 172 cm (5 ft 8 in)

Sport
- Country: Russia
- Sport: Wrestling
- Weight class: 66-74 kg
- Event: Freestyle

Achievements and titles
- Olympic finals: 7th (2008)
- World finals: (gold) (2003) (bronze) (2007)
- Regional finals: (gold) (2003) (silver) (2001) (silver) (2007)
- National finals: (gold) (2003, 2007, 2008, 2011) (silver) (2001, 2004, 2005, 2006) (bronze) (2002 ,2010)
Medal record
Men's freestyle wrestling
Representing Russia
World Championships
| Gold medal – first place | 2003 New York | 66 kg |
| Bronze medal – third place | 2007 Baku | 66 kg |
World Cup
| Silver medal – second place | 2002 Spokane | 74 kg |
European Championships
| Gold medal – first place | 2003 Riga | 66 kg |
| Silver medal – second place | 2007 Sofia | 66 kg |
| Silver medal – second place | 2001 Budapest | 69 kg |
Russian National Championships
| Gold medal – first place | 2011 Yakutsk | 74 kg |
| Gold medal – first place | 2008 St.Petersburg | 66 kg |
| Gold medal – first place | 2007 Moscow | 66 kg |
| Gold medal – first place | 2003 Cherkessk | 66 kg |
| Silver medal – second place | 2006 Nishnevartovsk | 66 kg |
| Silver medal – second place | 2005 Krasnodar | 66 kg |
| Silver medal – second place | 2004 St.Petersburg | 66 kg |
| Silver medal – second place | 2001 Moscow | 69 kg |
| Bronze medal – third place | 2010 Volgograd | 74 kg |
| Bronze medal – third place | 2002 Yakutsk | 74 kg |
Golden Grand Prix Ivan Yarygin
| Silver medal – second place | 2009 Krasnoyarsk | 74 kg |
Junior World Championships
| Bronze medal – third place | 2000 Nantes | 63 kg |
Junior European Championships
| Gold medal – first place | 2000 Sofia | 63 kg |
World Youth Games
| Gold medal – first place | 1998 Moscow | 57 kg |

Irbek Farniev (born January 12, 1980, in Vladikavkaz) is a male freestyle wrestler from Russia. He participated in Men's freestyle 66 kg at 2008 Summer Olympics. After winning two fights he was eliminated in the 1/4 of final losing with Leonid Spiridonov.

He was gold medalist of 2003 FILA Wrestling World Championships in New York City and bronze medalist of 2007 FILA Wrestling World Championships
