= Kedy =

Kedy Кеди
- Selo

Other transcription(s)
  - Avar: Къеди
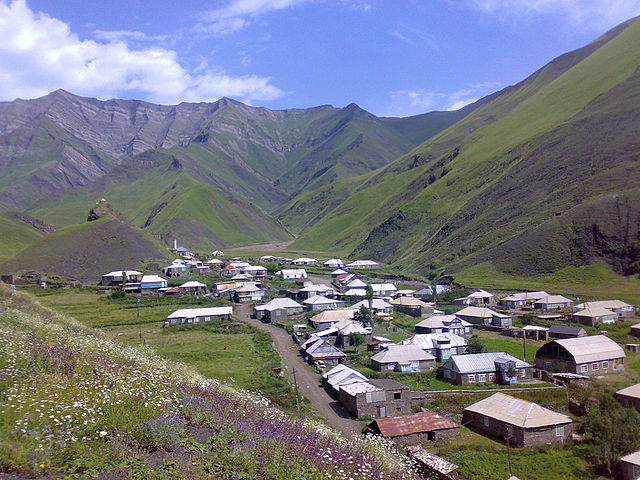
- View of Kedy
- Interactive map of Kedy
- Location of Kedy Kedy (Republic of Dagestan)
- Coordinates: 42°31′29″N 45°58′0.4″E
- Country: Russia
- Federal subject: Dagestan
- Administrative district: Tsumadinsky District

Population (2010 Census)
  - Total: 738
  - Estimate (2025): 806 (+9.2%)
- Time zone: UTC+3 (MSK)
- Postal code: 368900
- OKTMO ID: 82657427101

Kedy (Russian: Кеди, Avar: Къеди) is a rural locality (a selo) in Tsumadinsky District of the Republic of Dagestan, Russia, located in the mountains near the Chechen border.

Kedy is also considered as a capital of Unqraq, the historic territory in Tsumadinskiy district which include 9 villages.

== Geographic location ==
Kedy is situated on a valley among mountains. River flows at the center of the village.

== Population ==
Avars (all of Muslim faith) live in the village and speak the Avar language.

| 2010 | 2012 | 2013 | 2014 | 2015 |
|---|---|---|---|---|
| ▲738 | ▲746 | ▲754 | ▲757 | ▲779 |

=== Migration ===
After involuntary resettlement to Vedeno (Chechen Republic) in the 1950s, part of the population of Kedy returned to the village and others left to different Dagestani villages. Now people from Kedy live in Makhachkala and generally in such villages as Shava (Babayurtovskiy district), Haji-Dada (Kumtorkalinskiy district), Kobi (Chechnya, Shelcovskoy district) and Aksay (Khasavyurtovskiy district).

== Notable people ==
- Makhach Murtazaliev — is an Avar born-Russian Olympic wrestler who won the bronze medal for Russia at the 2004 Summer Olympics in Athens.
