= Ramazan Şahin =

Russian-Turkish freestyle wrestler

Ramazan Şahin Рамзан Ирбайханов
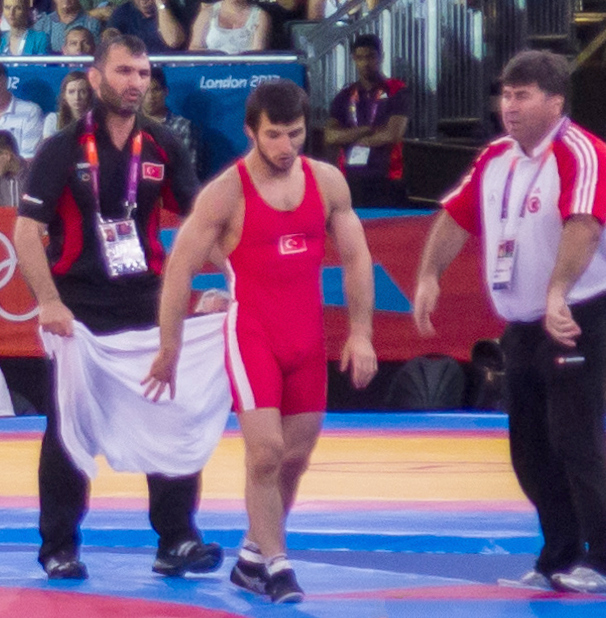
- Şahin with coaches at the 2012 Olympics

Personal information
- Full name: Ramzan Ismailovich Irbaikhanov
- Nationality: Russian; Turkish
- Born: Ramzan Irbaikhanov; 8 July 1983 (age 43) Makhachkala, Russia
- Height: 1.70 m (5.6 ft)
- Weight: 66 kg (146 lb)

Sport
- Sport: Wrestling
- Event: Freestyle
- Club: Istanbul BB SK
- Coached by: Isac Irbaykhanov (from 1995); Adem Bereket (from 2006)
- Now coaching: Turkmenistan
Medal record
Men's freestyle wrestling
Representing Turkey
Olympic Games
| Gold medal – first place | 2008 Beijing | 66 kg |
World Championships
| Gold medal – first place | 2007 Baku | 66 kg |
European Championships
| Gold medal – first place | 2008 Tampere | 66 kg |
| Bronze medal – third place | 2007 Sofia | 66 kg |

Ramazan Şahin (born Ramzan Irbaikhanov, Russian: Рамзан Ирбайханов, on 8 July 1983) is a Russian-Turkish freestyle wrestler. He won gold medals at the 2007 World Championships, 2008 European Championships, and 2008 Summer Olympics, placing fifth in 2012. From February 2019 head coach of Turkmenistan national wrestling team.

== Career ==
He competed for the Istanbul-based club Tekelspor, and then transferred to İstanbul Büyükşehir Belediyesi S.K.

Born in Khasavyurt in the North Caucasian federal subject Dagestan of the Soviet Union, he emigrated in 2005 to Turkey with the help of his uncle İshak İrbayhanov, manager of the Turkey national freestyle wrestling team. In 2006, Ramazan was naturalized with the initiative of Mehmet Ali Şahin, then Minister responsible for Sports and changed his family name to Şahin in respect of his patron.

== Coach career ==
After the completion of his sports career, he was one of the coaches of the Turkish national team.

In February 2019 he headed the national team of Turkmenistan in wrestling.
