= 2007 European Wrestling Championships =

- Host city: Sofia, Bulgaria
- Dates: 17 – 22 April 2007

Champions
- Freestyle: Ukraine
- Greco-Roman: Russia
- Women: Russia

The 2007 European Wrestling Championships was held from 17 April to 22 April 2007 in Sofia, Bulgaria.

== Medal table ==
Rank	Nation	Gold	Silver	Bronze	Total
1	Russia	11	3	4	18
2	Bulgaria	2	1	2	5
2	Georgia	2	1	2	5
4	Ukraine	1	6	3	10
5	Germany	1	2	3	6
6	Sweden	1	1	2	4
7	Belarus	1	1	1	3
8	Romania	1	1	0	2
9	Azerbaijan	1	0	1	2
10	Hungary	0	1	4	5
11	Italy	0	1	1	2
12	Czech Republic	0	1	0	1
12	Norway	0	1	0	1
12	Switzerland	0	1	0	1
15	Turkey	0	0	6	6
16	Poland	0	0	3	3
17	France	0	0	2	2
17	Greece	0	0	2	2
19	Armenia	0	0	1	1
19	Finland	0	0	1	1
19	Lithuania	0	0	1	1
19	Macedonia	0	0	1	1
19	Serbia	0	0	1	1
19	Spain	0	0	1	1
Totals (24 entries)		21	21	42	84

== Medal summary ==
=== Men's Greco-Roman ===
Event	Gold	Silver	Bronze
55 kg	Rovshan Bayramov; Azerbaijan	Zaur Kuramagomedov; Russia	Kristijan Fris; Serbia
55 kg	Rovshan Bayramov; Azerbaijan	Zaur Kuramagomedov; Russia	Vugar Rakhimov; Ukraine
60 kg	Eusebiu Diaconu; Romania	Stig Andre Berge; Norway	Suren Gevorkian; Ukraine
60 kg	Eusebiu Diaconu; Romania	Stig Andre Berge; Norway	Jarkko Ala-Huikku; Finland
66 kg	Nikolay Gergov; Bulgaria	Oleksandr Khvoshch; Ukraine	Marcus Thätner; Germany
66 kg	Nikolay Gergov; Bulgaria	Oleksandr Khvoshch; Ukraine	Refik Ayvazoğlu; Turkey
74 kg	Manuchar Kvirkvelia; Georgia	Reto Bucher; Switzerland	Mikhail Ivanchenko; Russia
74 kg	Manuchar Kvirkvelia; Georgia	Reto Bucher; Switzerland	Valdemaras Venckaitis; Lithuania
84 kg	Alexei Mishin; Russia	Jan Fischer; Germany	Andrea Minguzzi; Italy
84 kg	Alexei Mishin; Russia	Jan Fischer; Germany	Melonin Noumonvi; France
96 kg	Ramaz Nozadze; Georgia	Jimmy Lidberg; Sweden	Vasili Teplujov; Russia
96 kg	Ramaz Nozadze; Georgia	Jimmy Lidberg; Sweden	Balázs Kiss; Hungary
120 kg	Khasan Baroev; Russia	David Vala; Czech Republic	Jalmar Sjöberg; Sweden
120 kg	Khasan Baroev; Russia	David Vala; Czech Republic	İsmail Güzel; Turkey

=== Men's freestyle ===
Event	Gold	Silver	Bronze
55 kg	Besik Kudukhov; Russia	Marcel Ewald; Germany	Sezar Akgül; Turkey
55 kg	Besik Kudukhov; Russia	Marcel Ewald; Germany	Radoslav Velikov; Bulgaria
60 kg	Vasyl Fedoryshyn; Ukraine	Anatoli Guidea; Bulgaria	Gergõ Wöller; Hungary
60 kg	Vasyl Fedoryshyn; Ukraine	Anatoli Guidea; Bulgaria	Murad Ramazanov; Macedonia
66 kg	Albert Batyrov; Belarus	Irbek Farniev; Russia	Serafim Barzakov; Bulgaria
66 kg	Albert Batyrov; Belarus	Irbek Farniev; Russia	Ramazan Şahin; Turkey
74 kg	Makhach Murtazaliev; Russia	Gela Saghirashvili; Georgia	Çamsulvara Çamsulvarayev; Azerbaijan
74 kg	Makhach Murtazaliev; Russia	Gela Saghirashvili; Georgia	Emzarios Bentinidis; Greece
84 kg	Georgy Ketoev; Russia	Taras Danko; Ukraine	Árpád Ritter; Hungary
84 kg	Georgy Ketoev; Russia	Taras Danko; Ukraine	Serhat Balcı; Turkey
96 kg	Shirvani Muradov; Russia	Ruslan Sheikhau; Belarus	Shamil Gitinov; Armenia
96 kg	Shirvani Muradov; Russia	Ruslan Sheikhau; Belarus	Giorgi Gogshelidze; Georgia
120 kg	Kuramagomed Kuramagomedov; Russia	Serhii Priadun; Ukraine	Alex Modebadze; Georgia
120 kg	Kuramagomed Kuramagomedov; Russia	Serhii Priadun; Ukraine	Fatih Çakıroğlu; Turkey

=== Women's freestyle ===
Event	Gold	Silver	Bronze
48 kg	Lorisa Oorzhak; Russia	Fracine de Paola-Martinez; Italy	Sofia Mattsson; Sweden
48 kg	Lorisa Oorzhak; Russia	Fracine de Paola-Martinez; Italy	Brigitte Wagner; Germany
51 kg	Zamira Rakhmanova; Russia	Estera Dobre; Romania	Emese Barka; Hungary
51 kg	Zamira Rakhmanova; Russia	Estera Dobre; Romania	María del Mar Serrano; Spain
55 kg	Natalia Golts; Russia	Nataliya Synyshyn; Ukraine	Anna Gomis; France
55 kg	Natalia Golts; Russia	Nataliya Synyshyn; Ukraine	Sofia Poumpouridou; Greece
59 kg	Ida-Theres Karlsson; Sweden	Marianna Sastin; Hungary	Galina Legenkina; Russia
59 kg	Ida-Theres Karlsson; Sweden	Marianna Sastin; Hungary	Anna Zwirydowska; Poland
63 kg	Stefanie Stüber; Germany	Alena Kartashova; Russia	Monika Ewa Michalik; Poland
63 kg	Stefanie Stüber; Germany	Alena Kartashova; Russia	Hanna Vasylenko; Ukraine
67 kg	Anna Polovnena; Russia	Kateryna Burmistrova; Ukraine	Maria Müller; Germany
67 kg	Anna Polovnena; Russia	Kateryna Burmistrova; Ukraine	Iryna Tsyrkevich; Belarus
72 kg	Stanka Zlateva; Bulgaria	Svetlana Saenko; Ukraine	Guzel Manyurova; Russia
72 kg	Stanka Zlateva; Bulgaria	Svetlana Saenko; Ukraine	Agnieszka Wieszczek; Poland
