= Wrestling at the 2010 Commonwealth Games – Men's freestyle 74 kg =

Men's freestyle 74 kg competition at the 2010 Commonwealth Games in New Delhi, India, will be held on 9 October at the Indira Gandhi Arena.

== Medalists ==
Gold	Narsingh Yadav; India
Silver	Richard Addinall; South Africa
Bronze	Evan MacDonald; Canada

=== Bracket ===
Preliminary
Enetimi Joel (NGR)	1	1	0
Kostya Ermakovich (AUS)	3	3	0

Quarterfinals
Richard Addinall (RSA)	1	6	0
Muhammad Ali (PAK)	0	0	0
TebitaraUeresi (SOL)	0	0	0
Bakary Jarju (GAM)	5	3	0
Mike Grundy (ENG)	1	0	0
Narsingh Yadav (IND)	4	3	0
Evan MacDonald (CAN)	1	3	0
Kostya Ermakovich (AUS)	0	0	0

Semifinals
Richard Addinall (RSA)	0	2	7
Bakary Jarju (GAM)	2	1	0
Narsingh Yadav (IND)	1	2	0
Evan MacDonald (CAN)	0	1	0

Final
Richard Addinall (RSA)	0	0	0
Narsingh Yadav (IND)	2	2	0

=== Repechage ===
Quarterfinals	Semifinals				Bronze Medal Bout
	Ali Muhammad (PAK)	6	3	0
	Bakary Jarju (GAM)	0	0	0
					Ali Muhammad (PAK)	4	1	0
					Evan MacDonald (CAN)	0	4	4
	Mike Grundy (ENG)	2	2	0
	Evan MacDonald (CAN)	5	5	0
