= 2003 European Wrestling Championships =

- Host city: Riga, Latvia Greco-Roman; Belgrade, Serbia and Montenegro Freestyle
- Dates: 2 – 4 May 2003; 23 – 25 May 2003

Champions
- Freestyle: Russia
- Greco-Roman: Russia
- Women: Russia

The 2003 European Wrestling Championships were held in the men's Greco-Roman in Belgrade and men's freestyle style, and the women's freestyle in Riga.

== Medal table ==
Rank	Nation	Gold	Silver	Bronze	Total
1	Russia	7	1	4	12
2	Germany	2	3	1	6
3	Georgia	2	0	2	4
4	Bulgaria	2	0	0	2
5	Turkey	1	2	2	5
6	Hungary	1	1	0	2
7	Poland	1	0	3	4
8	France	1	0	1	2
8	Romania	1	0	1	2
10	Azerbaijan	1	0	0	1
10	Finland	1	0	0	1
10	Norway	1	0	0	1
13	Ukraine	0	5	4	9
14	Armenia	0	3	0	3
15	Greece	0	2	1	3
16	Belarus	0	1	1	2
16	Sweden	0	1	1	2
18	Austria	0	1	0	1
18	Czech Republic	0	1	0	1
Totals (19 entries)		21	21	21	63

== Medal summary ==
=== Men's freestyle ===
Event	Gold	Silver	Bronze
55 kg	Namig Abdullayev; Azerbaijan	Amiran Kardanov; Greece	Mavlet Batirov; Russia
60 kg	Anatolie Guidea; Bulgaria	Arif Kama; Turkey	Petru Toarcă; Romania
66 kg	Irbek Farniev; Russia	Elbrus Tedeyev; Ukraine	Ömer Çubukçu; Turkey
74 kg	Árpád Ritter; Hungary	Alexander Leipold; Germany	Murad Gaidarov; Belarus
84 kg	Revaz Mindorashvili; Georgia	Mamed Aghaev; Armenia	Vadim Laliev; Russia
96 kg	Khadzhimurat Gatsalov; Russia	Fatih Çakıroğlu; Turkey	Vadym Tasoyev; Ukraine
120 kg	David Musulbes; Russia	Serhii Priadun; Ukraine	Alex Modebadze; Georgia

=== Men's Greco-Roman ===
Event	Gold	Silver	Bronze
55 kg	Marian Sandu; Romania	Roman Amoyan; Armenia	Oleksiy Vakulenko; Ukraine
60 kg	Armen Nazaryan; Bulgaria	Suren Hevorkian; Ukraine	Rustem Mambetov; Russia
66 kg	Şeref Eroğlu; Turkey	Armen Vardanyan; Ukraine	Sergey Kuntarev; Russia
74 kg	Aleksey Glushkov; Russia	Aliaksandr Kikiniou; Belarus	Serkan Özden; Turkey
84 kg	Aleksey Mishin; Russia	Levon Geghamyan; Armenia	Mukhran Vakhtangadze; Georgia
96 kg	Ramaz Nozadze; Georgia	Mirko Englich; Germany	Davyd Saldadze; Ukraine
120 kg	Juha Ahokas; Finland	Mihály Deák-Bárdos; Hungary	Xenofon Koutsioumpas; Greece

=== Women's freestyle ===
Event	Gold	Silver	Bronze
48 kg	Brigitte Wagner; Germany	Liliya Kaskarakova; Russia	Angélique Berthenet; France
51 kg	Natalia Karamchakova; Russia	Ida-Theres Karlsson-Nerell; Sweden	Alexandra Engelhardt; Germany
55 kg	Natalia Golts; Russia	Sofia Poumpouridou; Greece	Sylwia Bileńska; Poland
59 kg	Monika Michalik; Poland	Stefanie Stüber; Germany	Olha Kryhina; Ukraine
63 kg	Lene Aanes; Norway	Nikola Hartmann-Dünser; Austria	Sara Eriksson; Sweden
67 kg	Lise Legrand; France	Valeriya Zlatova; Ukraine	Ewelina Pruszko; Poland
72 kg	Anita Schätzle; Germany	Kateřina Hálová; Czech Republic	Monika Kowalska; Poland
