= Elman Asgarov =

Azerbaijani freestyle wrestler

Personal information
- Full name: Elman Asgarov
- Nationality: Azerbaijani
- Born: 16 September 1975 (age 50) Baku, Azerbaijani SSR
- Height: 1.67 m (5 ft 5 1/2 in)
- Weight: 66 kg (146 lb)

Sport
- Style: Freestyle
- Club: SKA Neftçi Baku
- Coach: Yakub Mamedov
Medal record
Men's freestyle wrestling
Representing Azerbaijan
European Championships
Silver medal – second place	2002 Baku	66 kg
Silver medal – second place	2005 Varna	66 kg

Elman Asgarov (Azerbaijani: Elman Əsgərov; born 16 September 1975 in Baku) is a retired amateur Azerbaijani freestyle wrestler, who competed in the men's welterweight category. He captured a silver medal in the same division at the 2002 European Wrestling Championships in his hometown Baku, and later represented his nation Azerbaijan at the 2004 Summer Olympics. Throughout his sporting career, Asgarov has been training under his personal coach and mentor Yakub Mamedov for SKA Neftçi.

Asgarov qualified for Azerbaijan in the men's 66 kg class at the 2004 Summer Olympics in Athens by placing second behind Armenia's Zhirayr Hovhannisyan from the second Olympic Qualification Tournament in Sofia, Bulgaria. He was placed by a random draw into a three-man preliminary pool against United States' Jamill Kelly and Moldova's two-time Olympian Ruslan Bodişteanu. Asgarov outclassed his first opponent Bodisteanu (7–3) at the start of the pool, before he was narrowly beaten by Kelly (2–3) in his subsequent match to generate a record of nine technical points, finishing only in second place and twelfth overall in the final standings.
