= Ömer Çubukçu =

Turkish freestyle wrestler (born 1980)

Personal information
- Full name: Ömer Çubukçu
- Nationality: Turkey
- Born: 10 May 1980 (age 46) Pasinler, Erzurum, Turkey
- Height: 1.68 m (5 ft 6 in)
- Weight: 66 kg (146 lb)

Sport
- Sport: Freestyle wrestling
- Club: Şekerspor Wrestling Club
- Coached by: Gürsel Uzunca
Medal record
Men's freestyle wrestling
Representing Turkey
European Championships
Bronze medal – third place	2004 Ankara	66 kg
Bronze medal – third place	2003 Riga	66 kg
Mediterranean Games
Bronze medal – third place	2001 Tunis	63 kg
World Juniors Championships
Silver medal – second place	2000 Nantes	63 kg
European Juniors Championships
Silver medal – second place	2000 Sofia	63 kg

Ömer Çubukçu (born May 10, 1980 in Pasinler, Erzurum) is a retired amateur Turkish freestyle wrestler, who competed in the men's welterweight category. He won a bronze medal in the 63-kg division at the 2001 Mediterranean Games in Tunis, Tunisia, and also represented his nation Turkey at the 2004 Summer Olympics, finishing seventh in the process. Throughout his sporting career, Cubukcu trained full-time for Şekerspor Wrestling Club in Ankara under his personal coach Gürsel Uzunca.

Cubukcu emerged into sporting fame at the 2001 Mediterranean Games in Tunis, Tunisia, where he ousted his Egyptian rival Ibrahim Hassan for the bronze medal in the 63-kg division. He also picked up two more medals to his career hardware with a similar color in the men's 66 kg class at the European Championships (2003 and 2004).

At the 2004 Summer Olympics in Athens, Cubukcu qualified for the Turkish squad in the men's welterweight class (66 kg). Earlier in the process, he placed fourth from the Olympic Qualification Tournament in Sofia, Bulgaria to guarantee his spot on the Turkish wrestling team to the Games. Cubukcu dominated the prelim pool matches by thrashing two-time Olympian Štefan Fernyák of Slovakia (5–1) and Hungary's Gábor Hatos (3–1) to secure him a place for the medal rounds. As he faced against Russia's Makhach Murtazaliev in the quarterfinals, Cubukcu could not display a phenomenal maneuver from the prelims, and lost the match with a comfortable 0–6 decision, placing seventh in the final standings.
