= Bill Zadick =

American wrestler (born 1973)

Personal information
- Full name: William Michael Zadick
- Born: April 3, 1973 (age 53) Great Falls, Montana, U.S.

Sport
- Country: United States
- Sport: Wrestling
- Events: Freestyle and Folkstyle
- College team: Iowa
- Club: Hawkeye Wrestling Club
- Team: USA
- Coached by: Dan Gable
Medal record
Men's freestyle wrestling
Representing the United States
World Championships
Gold medal – first place	2006 Guangzhou	66 kg
Pan American Championships
Bronze medal – third place	2007 San Salvador	66 kg
Collegiate Wrestling
Representing the Iowa Hawkeyes
NCAA Division I Championships
Gold medal – first place	1996 Minneapolis	142 lb
Big Ten Championships
Gold medal – first place	1996 Iowa City	142 lb
Silver medal – second place	1995 Bloomington	142 lb

William Michael Zadick (born April 3, 1973) is an American amateur wrestler. He won an NCAA college wrestling championship while competing with the University of Iowa and a gold medal at the 2006 World Wrestling Championships in freestyle wrestling.

== International wrestling career ==
Bill Zadick was a resident athlete at the U.S. Olympic Training Center in Colorado Springs, Colorado, from 2004-2008. His intensive training there helped him reach the pinnacle of the international amateur wrestling ranks when he won the gold medal at 66 kg/145.5 pounds at the 2006 FILA Wrestling World Championships in Guangzhou, China. He won bronze at the 2007 Pan-American Championships.

Zadick's international wrestling career began in 1996, after he graduated from the University of Iowa. He competed in the 2001 World Championships, placing seventh. Zadick was the runner-up at 66 kg at the U.S. Olympic Team Trials in 2000 and 2008. He was a three-time U.S. Nationals finalist in 2003, 2006, and 2008, and a two-time World Team Trials runner-up in 1999 and 2002.

In 2021, Zadick was inducted into the National Wrestling Hall of Fame as a Distinguished Member.

== College wrestling career ==
Zadick was a two-time All-American for the University of Iowa, where he was coached by the legendary Dan Gable. Zadick placed fifth at the 1995 NCAA national championships and capped his career at Iowa by winning the NCAA championship at 142 pounds in 1996. His collegiate career record was 87-13 with 16 pins, competing from 1993 to 1996 at 134 and 142 pounds.

He earned a bachelor's degree in art from Iowa in 1996.

== High school wrestling career ==
Zadick wrestled at Great Falls High School in Great Falls, Montana, where he was coached by Tim Owen. He was a four-time Montana state champion, which he accomplished in four different weight classes: 98 pounds (1988), 112 pounds (1989), 119 pounds (1990), and 135 pounds (1991).

== Coaching career ==
After retiring from competition in 2008, Zadick was named the Resident Coordinator and Assistant National Coach for USA Wrestling. He serves as the liaison between USA Wrestling and the U.S. Olympic Training Center in matters pertaining to USA Wrestling's resident athlete programs. Among his other duties are coordinating educational and professional development opportunities for the wrestling resident athletes, and assisting with coaching at resident and National Team practices. Zadick was instrumental in bringing 2013 Junior World gold medalist wrestler Kyle Snyder to the United States Olympic Training Center, and helped coached Kyle Snyder to a Junior World Championship in August 2013.

In June 2016, Zadick was named the head coach of the United States Senior Freestyle team, beginning after the 2016 Olympics. The following year, he won the USOC National Coach of the Year in 2017.

== Personal information ==
Bill and his younger brother, Mike Zadick, are part of the University of Iowa's tradition of brothers competing for the Hawkeyes. Mike was a 2008 Olympian and the 2006 silver medalist at 132.25 pounds (60 kg). He was a three-time all-American for the Hawkeyes, winning a Big Ten title at 149 pounds in 2002. Mike coached for the Iowa State University Cyclones.

Zadick is the son of Bob and Toni Zadick of Great Falls. He also has two sisters, Terri and MaryAnn. He lives in Colorado Springs, Colorado.

== See also ==
- List of World and Olympic Champions in Men's Freestyle Wrestling
- United States results in Men's Freestyle Wrestling
- Greco-Roman wrestling
