= 2007 World Wrestling Championships =

- Host city: Baku, Azerbaijan
- Dates: 17–23 September 2007
- Stadium: Heydar Aliyev Sports and Concert Complex

Champions
- Freestyle: Russia
- Greco-Roman: United States
- Women: Japan

The 2007 World Wrestling Championships were held at the Heydar Aliyev Sports and Concert Complex in Baku, Azerbaijan. The event took place from September 17 to September 23, 2007.

== Medal table ==
Rank	Nation	Gold	Silver	Bronze	Total
1	Russia	7	1	5	13
2	Japan	4	1	0	5
3	Bulgaria	2	1	1	4
4	Georgia	2	0	2	4
5	Cuba	1	2	2	5
6	Iran	1	1	3	5
7	France	1	1	2	4
8	China	1	1	1	3
9	Azerbaijan	1	0	1	2
10	Turkey	1	0	0	1
11	United States	0	2	5	7
12	Ukraine	0	2	2	4
13	Kazakhstan	0	1	2	3
14	Canada	0	1	1	2
14	Lithuania	0	1	1	2
14	Mongolia	0	1	1	2
14	South Korea	0	1	1	2
18	Denmark	0	1	0	1
18	Germany	0	1	0	1
18	Sweden	0	1	0	1
18	Tajikistan	0	1	0	1
22	Uzbekistan	0	0	3	3
23	Albania	0	0	1	1
23	Armenia	0	0	1	1
23	Belarus	0	0	1	1
23	Czech Republic	0	0	1	1
23	Kyrgyzstan	0	0	1	1
23	Poland	0	0	1	1
23	Romania	0	0	1	1
23	Serbia	0	0	1	1
23	Venezuela	0	0	1	1
Totals (31 entries)		21	21	42	84

== Team ranking ==
Rank	Men's freestyle		Men's Greco-Roman		Women's freestyle	
Rank	Team	Points	Team	Points	Team	Points
1	Russia	68	United States	31	Japan	52
2	Turkey	40	Russia	30	Kazakhstan	39
3	Cuba	34	Georgia	28	Ukraine	39
4	United States	32	Iran	26	China	36
5	Uzbekistan	31	South Korea	24	United States	32
6	Ukraine	28	France	23	Canada	31
7	Iran	19	Kazakhstan	21	Russia	31
8	Kyrgyzstan	14	Hungary	19	France	26
9	Bulgaria; Mongolia	12	Bulgaria	18	Germany	16
10	Bulgaria; Mongolia	12	Lithuania	17	Sweden	16

== Medal summary ==
=== Men's freestyle ===
Event	Gold	Silver	Bronze
55 kg	Besik Kudukhov; Russia	Bayaraagiin Naranbaatar; Mongolia	Rizvan Gadzhiev; Belarus
55 kg	Besik Kudukhov; Russia	Bayaraagiin Naranbaatar; Mongolia	Andy Moreno; Cuba
60 kg	Mavlet Batirov; Russia	Anatolie Guidea; Bulgaria	Bazar Bazarguruev; Kyrgyzstan
60 kg	Mavlet Batirov; Russia	Anatolie Guidea; Bulgaria	Sahit Prizreni; Albania
66 kg	Ramazan Şahin; Turkey	Geandry Garzón; Cuba	Otar Tushishvili; Georgia
66 kg	Ramazan Şahin; Turkey	Geandry Garzón; Cuba	Irbek Farniev; Russia
74 kg	Makhach Murtazaliev; Russia	Ibragim Aldatov; Ukraine	Iván Fundora; Cuba
74 kg	Makhach Murtazaliev; Russia	Ibragim Aldatov; Ukraine	Chamsulvara Chamsulvarayev; Azerbaijan
84 kg	Georgy Ketoev; Russia	Yusup Abdusalomov; Tajikistan	Zaurbek Sokhiev; Uzbekistan
84 kg	Georgy Ketoev; Russia	Yusup Abdusalomov; Tajikistan	Reza Yazdani; Iran
96 kg	Khadzhimurat Gatsalov; Russia	Saeid Ebrahimi; Iran	Kurban Kurbanov; Uzbekistan
96 kg	Khadzhimurat Gatsalov; Russia	Saeid Ebrahimi; Iran	Daniel Cormier; United States
120 kg	Bilyal Makhov; Russia	Alexis Rodríguez; Cuba	Vadim Tasoyev; Ukraine
120 kg	Bilyal Makhov; Russia	Alexis Rodríguez; Cuba	Artur Taymazov; Uzbekistan

=== Men's Greco-Roman ===
Event	Gold	Silver	Bronze
55 kg	Hamid Sourian; Iran	Park Eun-chul; South Korea	Nazyr Mankiev; Russia
55 kg	Hamid Sourian; Iran	Park Eun-chul; South Korea	Kristijan Fris; Serbia
60 kg	David Bedinadze; Georgia	Makoto Sasamoto; Japan	Jung Ji-hyun; South Korea
60 kg	David Bedinadze; Georgia	Makoto Sasamoto; Japan	Eusebiu Diaconu; Romania
66 kg	Farid Mansurov; Azerbaijan	Steeve Guénot; France	Nikolay Gergov; Bulgaria
66 kg	Farid Mansurov; Azerbaijan	Steeve Guénot; France	Justin Lester; United States
74 kg	Yavor Yanakiev; Bulgaria	Mark Madsen; Denmark	Valdemaras Venckaitis; Lithuania
74 kg	Yavor Yanakiev; Bulgaria	Mark Madsen; Denmark	Christophe Guénot; France
84 kg	Aleksey Mishin; Russia	Brad Vering; United States	Saman Tahmasebi; Iran
84 kg	Aleksey Mishin; Russia	Brad Vering; United States	Badri Khasaia; Georgia
96 kg	Ramaz Nozadze; Georgia	Mindaugas Ežerskis; Lithuania	Ghasem Rezaei; Iran
96 kg	Ramaz Nozadze; Georgia	Mindaugas Ežerskis; Lithuania	Marek Švec; Czech Republic
120 kg	Mijaín López; Cuba	Khasan Baroev; Russia	Dremiel Byers; United States
120 kg	Mijaín López; Cuba	Khasan Baroev; Russia	Yury Patrikeyev; Armenia

=== Women's freestyle ===
Event	Gold	Silver	Bronze
48 kg	Chiharu Icho; Japan	Iryna Merleni; Ukraine	Mayelis Caripá; Venezuela
48 kg	Chiharu Icho; Japan	Iryna Merleni; Ukraine	Li Xiaomei; China
51 kg	Hitomi Sakamoto; Japan	Ren Xuecheng; China	Anne-Catherine Deluntsch; France
51 kg	Hitomi Sakamoto; Japan	Ren Xuecheng; China	Erica Sharp; Canada
55 kg	Saori Yoshida; Japan	Ida-Theres Karlsson; Sweden	Natalia Golts; Russia
55 kg	Saori Yoshida; Japan	Ida-Theres Karlsson; Sweden	Olga Smirnova; Kazakhstan
59 kg	Audrey Prieto; France	Stéphanie Groß; Germany	Dorjiin Narmandakh; Mongolia
59 kg	Audrey Prieto; France	Stéphanie Groß; Germany	Nataliya Synyshyn; Ukraine
63 kg	Kaori Icho; Japan	Yelena Shalygina; Kazakhstan	Sara McMann; United States
63 kg	Kaori Icho; Japan	Yelena Shalygina; Kazakhstan	Monika Rogien; Poland
67 kg	Jing Ruixue; China	Martine Dugrenier; Canada	Natalia Kuksina; Russia
67 kg	Jing Ruixue; China	Martine Dugrenier; Canada	Katie Downing; United States
72 kg	Stanka Zlateva; Bulgaria	Kristie Marano; United States	Guzel Manyurova; Russia
72 kg	Stanka Zlateva; Bulgaria	Kristie Marano; United States	Olga Zhanibekova; Kazakhstan

== Participating nations ==
797 competitors from 92 nations participated.

- Albania (2)
- Algeria (5)
- Armenia (15)
- Australia (13)
- Austria (4)
- Azerbaijan (19)
- Bahamas (1)
- Belarus (21)
- Bolivia (1)
- Brazil (5)
- Bulgaria (17)
- Cameroon (2)
- Canada (17)
- Central African Republic (1)
- Chile (1)
- China (21)
- Chinese Taipei (4)
- Colombia (10)
- Congo DR (2)
- Croatia (3)
- Cuba (13)
- Cyprus (2)
- Czech Republic (10)
- Denmark (3)
- Dominican Republic (3)
- Ecuador (1)
- Egypt (7)
- El Salvador (2)
- Estonia (6)
- Federated States of Micronesia (3)
- Finland (8)
- France (15)
- Georgia (14)
- Germany (21)
- Great Britain (1)
- Greece (19)
- Guam (2)
- Guatemala (1)
- Guinea (2)
- Guinea-Bissau (2)
- Hungary (19)
- India (21)
- Iran (14)
- Iraq (13)
- Ireland (1)
- Israel (9)
- Italy (16)
- Ivory Coast (2)
- Japan (21)
- Jordan (2)
- Kazakhstan (21)
- Kyrgyzstan (14)
- Latvia (12)
- Lithuania (9)
- Macedonia (5)
- Mexico (3)
- Moldova (13)
- Mongolia (14)
- Montenegro (4)
- New Zealand (2)
- Nicaragua (1)
- North Korea (5)
- Norway (6)
- Palau (4)
- Panama (1)
- Peru (3)
- Poland (19)
- Portugal (1)
- Puerto Rico (7)
- Qatar (3)
- Romania (18)
- Russia (21)
- Senegal (5)
- Serbia (6)
- Slovakia (4)
- Slovenia (2)
- South Africa (5)
- South Korea (20)
- Spain (13)
- Sweden (9)
- Switzerland (10)
- Syria (4)
- Tajikistan (6)
- Tunisia (10)
- Turkey (16)
- Turkmenistan (5)
- Uganda (1)
- Ukraine (21)
- United States (21)
- Uzbekistan (18)
- Venezuela (12)
- Vietnam (6)
