= Jamill Kelly =

American wrestler (born 1977)

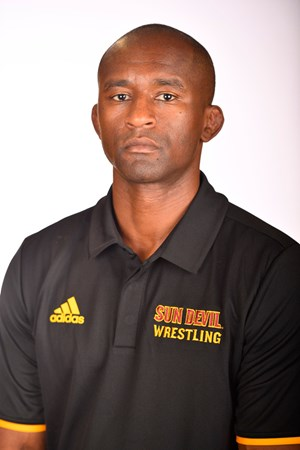
- Kelly in 2021

Personal information
- Full name: Larry Jamill Kelly
- Born: October 25, 1977 (age 48) Atwater, California, U.S.

Sport
- Country: United States
- Sport: Wrestling
- Events: Freestyle and Folkstyle
- College team: Oklahoma State
- Club: Gator Wrestling Club
- Team: USA
- Coached by: John Smith
Medal record
Men's freestyle wrestling
Representing United States
Olympic Games
| Silver medal – second place | 2004 Athens | 66 kg |
Pan American Games
| Bronze medal – third place | 2003 Santo Domingo | 66 kg |
Pan American Championships
| Silver medal – second place | 2001 Santo Domingo | 63 kg |

Larry Jamill Kelly (born October 25, 1977) is an American freestyle wrestler. He represented the United States at the 2004 Summer Olympic Games where he earned a silver medal in men's freestyle wrestling at 66 kg.

== Early life ==
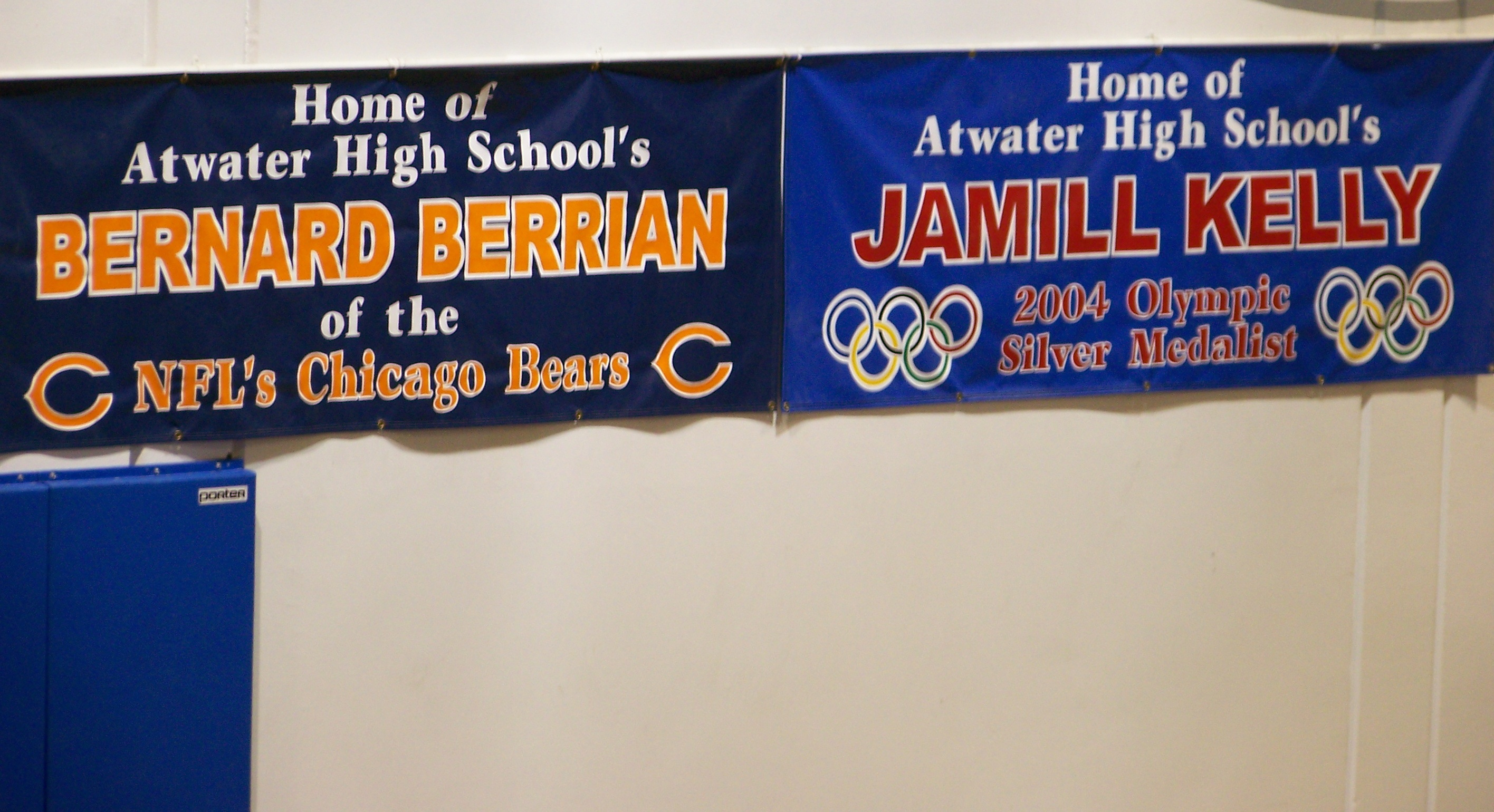
Banner at Atwater High School

Kelly was born in Atwater, California, where he attended Atwater High School. He placed fourth in the California state wrestling tournament as a senior. Kelly spent one year at Lassen Community College, before transferring to Oklahoma State University, where he became a three-time letter winner and two-time NCAA qualifier.

== 2004 Olympics ==
Although he never won a high school state title or a college national title, Kelly won the 2004 USA Nationals and US Olympic trials at 66 kg (145.5 lbs) to represent the United States at the 2004 Summer Olympics. After winning both pool matches by a 3-0 score, he defeated eventual bronze medalist Makhach Murtazaliev of Russia in the semifinal, 3-1. In the gold medal match, Kelly faced Ukrainian Elbrus Tedeyev. Tedeyev would win the gold by a 3-1 score, with Kelly finishing as an Olympic silver medalist.

== Coaching career ==
In 2007, Kelly served as a coach at Harvard, helping the program to their highest ever NCAA team finish. From 2007 to 2010, he was the head coach of Dallas Dynamite Wrestling Club in Dallas, Texas. He coached at Cal Poly from 2011 to 2012, where he helped Borislav Novachkov to an NCAA All-American finish. He then served as a coach at NC State from 2012 to 2014, where he helped Nick Gwiazdowski win an NCAA championship.

In 2015, he became a guest wrestling coach for Daniel Cormier, Luke Rockhold and Cain Velasquez, all from the American Kickboxing Academy.

From 2014 to 2018, Kelly served as an associate head coach at Stanford. He then served as an assistant coach at Arizona State from 2018 to 2020, where Zahid Valencia won an NCAA championship, before serving as an assistant coach at UNC Chapel Hill from 2020 to 2023, where he helped guide Austin O'Connor to two NCAA championships.

Kelly came back to NC State in 2025, where he serves as a coach for the Wolfpack RTC. In 2025, he helped assist with Trent Hidlay winning a World Championship, the first wrestler from NC State to do so.

== Honors ==
In 2021, Kelly was honored with the Lifetime Service to Wrestling award by the California chapter of the National Wrestling Hall of Fame.
