= Geandry Garzón =

Cuban freestyle wrestler

Personal information
- Full name: Geandry Garzón Caballero
- Born: November 3, 1983 (age 43) Santiago de Cuba, Cuban
Medal record
Men's freestyle wrestling
Representing Cuba
World Championships
Silver medal – second place	2007 Baku	66 kg
Bronze medal – third place	2005 Budapest	66 kg
Bronze medal – third place	2006 Guangzhou	66 kg
Bronze medal – third place	2010 Moscow	66 kg
Pan American Games
Bronze medal – third place	2019 Lima	74 kg

Geandry Garzón Caballero (born November 3, 1983, in Santiago de Cuba) is a male freestyle wrestler from Cuba. He participated in Men's freestyle 66 kg at 2008 Summer Olympics. He lost the bronze medal fight with Otar Tushishvili.

He represented Cuba at the 2020 Summer Olympics held in Tokyo, Japan. He competed in the men's 74 kg event.

In 2024, at the Pan American Wrestling Olympic Qualification Tournament held in Acapulco, Mexico, he earned a quota place for Cuba for the 2024 Summer Olympics held in Paris, France.
