= Ruslan Bodișteanu =

Moldovan freestyle wrestler

Personal information
- Full name: Ruslan Bodișteanu
- Nationality: Moldova
- Born: 15 May 1977 (age 49) Fundul Galbenei, Moldavian SSR, Soviet Union
- Height: 1.67 m (5 ft 5 1/2 in)
- Weight: 63 kg (139 lb)

Sport
- Style: Freestyle
- Club: Olimpia Chișinău; Dinamo Chișinău
- Coach: Nicolae Oreol

Ruslan Bodișteanu (born 15 May 1977) is a Moldovan freestyle wrestler, who competed in the men's lightweight and welterweight categories. He has held two World Junior Championship titles (1994 and 1997), and later represented his nation Moldova in two editions of the Olympic Games (2000 and 2004). Throughout his sporting career, Bodisteanu has been training under his personal coach and mentor Nicolae Oreol for the Olympic Sports Club (Romanian: Olimpiu de club sportiv) in Chișinău before he became an assistant coach of the national wrestling team. Bodisteanu is also the twin brother of Moldova's current youth and sports minister Octavian Bodişteanu.

Bodisteanu made his official debut at the 2000 Summer Olympics in Sydney, where he competed in the men's lightweight division (63 kg). Fighting against Bulgaria's Serafim Barzakov and Germany's Jürgen Scheibe in the preliminary pool, Bodisteanu scored a total of five classification and eleven technical points to claim a second spot and tenth overall from the standings, but narrowly missed the knockout stages.

At the 2004 Summer Olympics in Athens, Bodisteanu qualified for the Moldovan squad, as a 27-year-old, in the men's welterweight class (66 kg) by placing sixth from the European Qualification Tournament in Ankara, Turkey. He was placed by a random draw into a three-man preliminary pool against Azerbaijan's Elman Asgarov and United States' Jamill Kelly. At the end of the pool, Bodisteanu could not generate a blistering record from Sydney with two straight losses each to Asgarov (3–7) and Kelly (0–3) on three technical points, finishing only in third place and nineteenth overall in the final standings.
