= Evan MacDonald =

Canadian wrestler (born 1981)

Personal information
- Nationality: Canadian
- Born: July 29, 1981 (age 44) Germany
- Height: 1.68 m (5 ft 6 in)
- Weight: 66 kg (146 lb)

Sport
- Sport: Wrestling
Medal record
Men's Freestyle wrestling
Representing Canada
Commonwealth Games
| Bronze medal – third place | 2010 Delhi | Freestyle 74 kg |
- Updated on August 6, 2012

Evan MacDonald (born July 29, 1981) is a German-born Canadian wrestler who represented Canada at the 2004 Summer Olympics. Before competing in the Olympics, Evan worked at the Knoll furniture company and helped design some of their products.
