= Leonid Spiridonov =

Kazakhstani wrestler (born 1980)

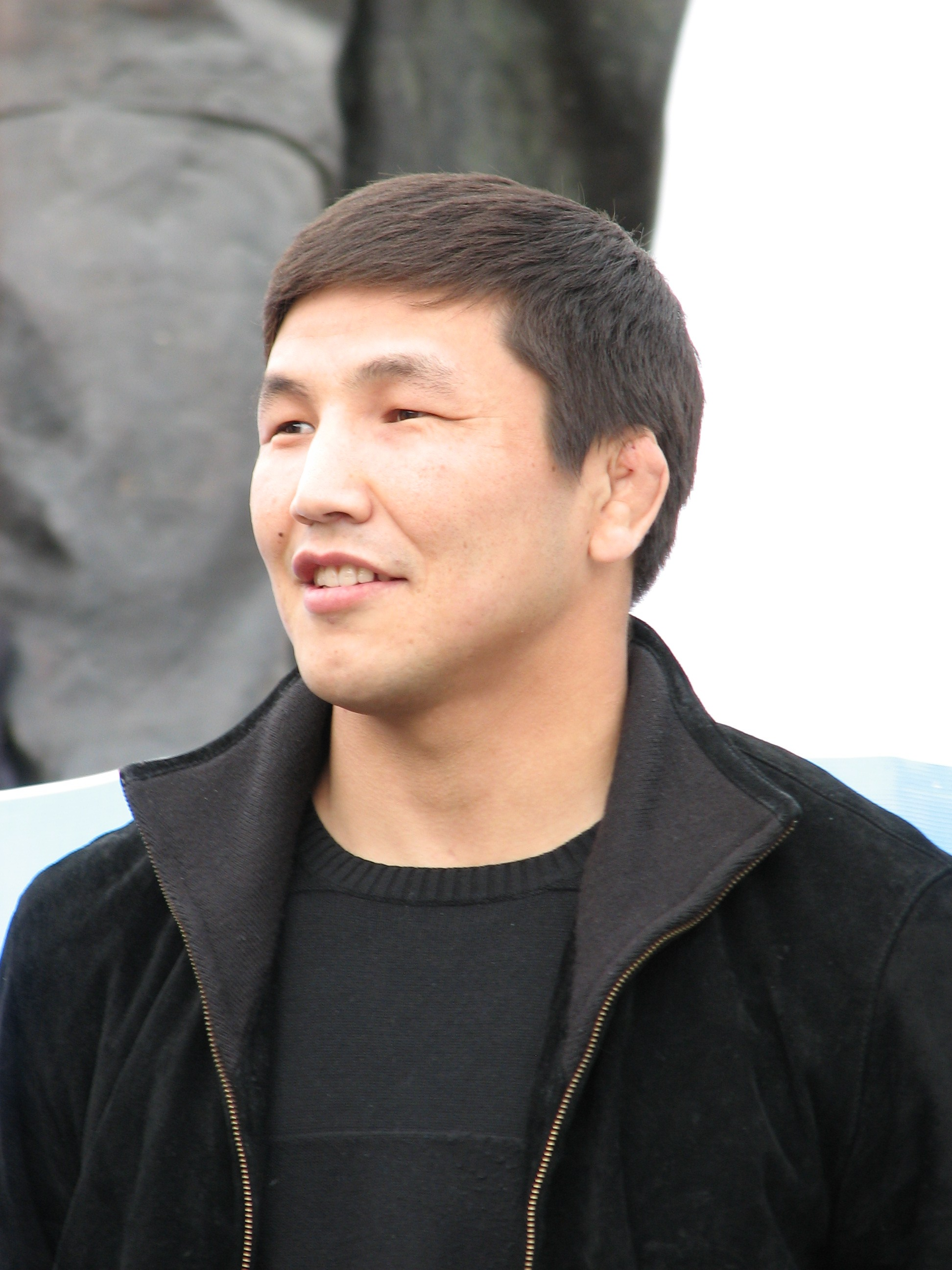

Personal information
- Native name: Леонид Спиридонов
- Nationality: Kazakhstan
- Born: 16 December 1980 (age 45) Yakutsk, Russian SFSR, Soviet Union
- Height: 169 cm (5 ft 7 in)

Sport
- Country: Kazakhstan
- Sport: Wrestling
- Weight class: 66 kg
- Event: Freestyle

Achievements and titles
- Olympic finals: 4th (2004) 5th (2008)
- World finals: 5th (2005)
Medal record
Men's Freestyle wrestling
Representing Kazakhstan
World Championships
Bronze medal – third place	2009 Herning	66 kg
World Cup
Silver medal – second place	2012 Baku	66 kg
Silver medal – second place	2009 Tehran	66 kg
Asian Games
Bronze medal – third place	2010 Guangzhou	66 kg
Asian Championships
Gold medal – first place	2006 Almaty	66 kg
Asian Cup
Gold medal – first place	2003 Almaty	66 kg
Golden Grand Prix Ivan Yarygin
Bronze medal – third place	2005 Krasnoyarsk	66 kg
Representing Russia
World University Championships
Gold medal – first place	2000 Tokyo	63 kg
World Junior Championships
Silver medal – second place	1999 Sydney	63 kg
Men's Beach wrestling
World Beach Championships
Gold medal – first place	2014 Katerini	80 kg

Leonid Spiridonov (born December 16, 1980, in Kerdyom) is a freestyle wrestler from Kazakhstan. He participated in Men's freestyle 66 kg at the 2008 Summer Olympics. He lost the bronze medal fight against Sushil Kumar from India and was ranked on 4-5th place.

At Men's freestyle 66 kg at 2004 Summer Olympics he was ranked on 4th place as well.

He also participated in the 2006 Asian Games.
