= Grégory Sarrasin =

Swiss freestyle wrestler

Grégory Sarrasin (born March 17, 1979) is a male freestyle wrestler from Switzerland. He participated in Men's freestyle 66 kg at 2008 Summer Olympics. He was eliminated from competition by Emin Azizov in the 1/16 of final.
