= Kazuhiko Ikematsu =

Japanese freestyle wrestler

Personal information
- National team: Japan
- Born: December 26, 1979 (age 46) Fukuoka, Japan

Sport
- Sport: Wrestling
- Weight class: 66 kg
Medal record
Men's freestyle wrestling
Representing Japan
World Championships
Bronze medal – third place	2003 New York City	66 kg
Asian Championships
Bronze medal – third place	2008 Jeju City	66 kg

Kazuhiko Ikematsu (池松 和彦, Ikematsu Kazuhiko; born December 26, 1979 in Fukuoka) is a male freestyle wrestler from Japan.

He won a bronze medal at the 2003 FILA Wrestling World Championships. During the Men's freestyle (66 kg) event at the 2004 Summer Olympics he was ranked on 5th place. He participated in Men's freestyle (66 kg) event at the 2008 Summer Olympics. He was eliminated from the tournament after he lost to Otar Tushishvili.

== Awards ==
- Tokyo Sports
  - Wrestling Special Award (2003)
