= Baek Jin-kuk =

South Korean freestyle wrestler (born 1976)

Baek Jin-kuk (Korean: 백진국, born 31 December 1976) is a Korean former wrestler who competed in the 2004 Summer Olympics.
