= Otar Tushishvili =

Georgian wrestler (born 1978)

Personal information
- Native name: ოთარ თუშიშვილი
- Nationality: Georgia
- Born: 14 June 1978 (age 48) Gori, Georgian SSR, Soviet Union
- Height: 173 cm (5 ft 8 in)

Sport
- Country: Georgia
- Sport: Wrestling
- Weight class: 66 kg
- Event: Freestyle
Medal record
Men's freestyle wrestling
Representing Georgia
Olympic Games
Bronze medal – third place	2008 Beijing	66 kg
World Championships
Silver medal – second place	2006 Guanzhou	66 kg
Bronze medal – third place	2007 Baku	66 kg
Bronze medal – third place	2005 Budapest	66 kg
European Championships
Bronze medal – third place	2010 Baku	63 kg
Bronze medal – third place	2001 Budapest	66 kg
Bronze medal – third place	1999 Minsk	58 kg
Universiade
Bronze medal – third place	2005 Izmir	66 kg
Junior World Championships
Bronze medal – third place	1996 Moscow	54 kg
Junior European Championships
Gold medal – first place	1996 Sofia	54 kg
Silver medal – second place	1998 Radovis	56 kg
Silver medal – second place	1995 Witten	50 kg
Cadet World Championships
Bronze medal – third place	1993 Duisburg	43 kg

Otar Tushishvili (born 14 June 1978 in Gori) is a Georgian wrestler, who won a bronze medal at the 2008 Summer Olympics.
