= Zhirayr Hovhannisyan =

Armenian freestyle wrestler

Personal information
- Born: 11 July 1981 (age 45) Vanadzor, Armenia
- Height: 1.73 m (5 ft 8 in)
- Weight: 66 kg (146 lb)

Sport
- Sport: Wrestling
- Event: Freestyle
- Coached by: Zhora Hovhannisyan
Medal record
Men's Freestyle Wrestling
Representing Armenia
European Championship
| Bronze medal – third place | 2009 Vilnius | 66 kg |

Zhirayr Hovhannisyan (Armenian: Ժիրայր Հովհաննիսյան, born 11 July 1981) is an Armenian Freestyle wrestler. He competed at the 2004 Summer Olympics in the men's freestyle 66 kg division and won a bronze medal at the 2009 European Wrestling Championships in Vilnius. Hovhannisyan also won a bronze medal at the 2009 European Wrestling Championships.
