= Makhach Murtazaliev =

Russian wrestler (born 1984)

Personal information
- Native name: Махач Далгатович Муртазалиев
- Nationality: Russia
- Born: 4 June 1984 (age 42) Kedy, Dagestan, Russia
- Height: 172 cm (5 ft 8 in)

Sport
- Country: Russia
- Sport: Wrestling
- Weight class: 66-74 kg
- Event: Freestyle
Medal record
Men's freestyle wrestling
Representing Russia
Olympic Games
Bronze medal – third place	2004 Athens	66 kg
World Championships
Gold medal – first place	Baku 2007	74 kg
Gold medal – first place	Budapest 2005	66 kg
European Championships
Gold medal – first place	2008 Tampere	74kg
Gold medal – first place	2007 Sofia	74kg
Gold medal – first place	2006 Moscow	66kg
Gold medal – first place	2004 Ankara	66kg
Russian National Championships
Gold medal – first place	2007 Moscow	74 kg
Gold medal – first place	2006 Nishnevartovsk	66 kg
Gold medal – first place	2005 Krasnodar	66 kg
Gold medal – first place	2004 St.Petersburg	66 kg
Silver medal – second place	2008 St.Petersburg	74 kg
Golden Grand Prix Ivan Yarygin
Gold medal – first place	2009 Krasnoyarsk	74 kg
Junior World Championships
Gold medal – first place	2003 Istanbul	60 kg
Cadet European Championships
Gold medal – first place	2001 Izmir	54 kg
Gold medal – first place	2000 Bratislava	42 kg

Makhach Dalgatovich Murtazaliev (Russian: Махач Далгатович Муртазалиев; born 4 June 1984) is a Russian Olympic wrestler who won the bronze medal for Russia at the 2004 Summer Olympics in Athens.

In 2006, he went up to the next weight category and was the 2007 World and European champion at 74 kg.
