= Travnikov =

Travnikov (Russian: Травников), feminine Travnikova, is a Russian surname. Notable people with the surname include:

- Andrey Travnikov (born 1971), Russian politician
- Herman Travnikov (born 1937), Russian artist
- Olga Travnikova (born 1970), Kazakhstani handball player
