= Herman Travnikov =

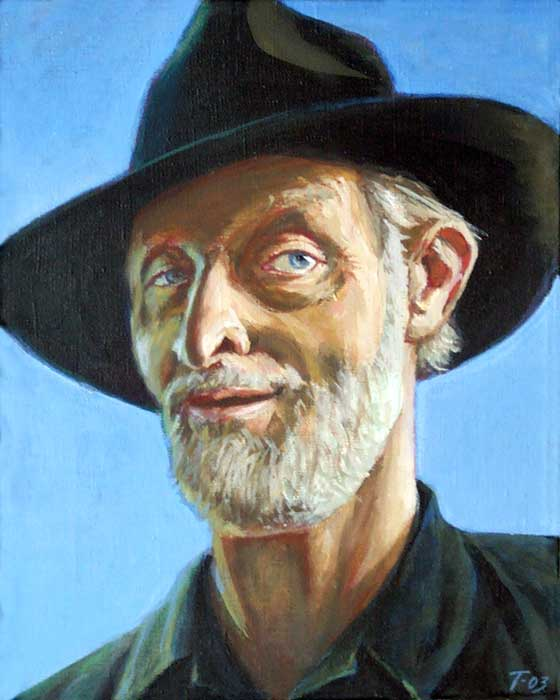
- Alter Ego, 2003, acrylic
- Born: December 15, 1937; Mekhonskoye, Kurgan Oblast, USSR
- Website: travnikov.ru

Herman Travnikov (Russian: Герман Алексеевич Травников; born December 15, 1937) is a Russian artist who has held title "People's Artist of the Russian Federation", the highest title of the Russian Federation in the field of fine art, since 2007.

He has a wide range of works. Working in oil, watercolor and tempera paintings, Herman Travnikov refers to different genres from common to animalistic. Above all he is known for his watercolor landscapes and portraits.

"I work in different techniques but watercolours seem to be the most sympathetic and sensitive to the motions of human heart. I believe that just watercolours will help me to express what I appreciate in art - truth and beauty."

== Biography ==
Herman Travnikov born in 1937 in Mekhonskoye village, Kargapolsky District of Chelyabinsk Region (now Shatrovskoye District of Kurgan Region).

In 1945 he enrolled in the first grade of the primary school in Borovljanskoye village (Belozersky District of Kurgan Region). In 1951-1952 he studied at the village school of Oktyabrsky of Novosibirsk Region. 1952-1953 he studied for his 8th grade in the district center Pihtovka of Novosibirsk Region. In 1953-1955 he studied grades 9-10 at the village school of Isetskoye of Tyumen Region.

In 1955 he worked as an artist in the Kurgan Machine-Building Plant, Kurganmashzavod.

In 1956 he commenced studies in the Sverdlovsk Art College.

In 1957-1959 he served in the Soviet Army within the border troops of Primorye Territory Far East. Since 1959 was a member of the CPSU. In 1989 he left the party.

In 1959-1963 he worked as an artist in a department store (Sverdlovsk).

In 1963 he graduated from the Sverdlovsk Art College.

In 1963-1964 he worked as an artist in "Sputnik" cinema (Kurgan).

In 1964-1966 he headed the art studio Kurgan State Pedagogical Institute.

In 1966-1968 he worked as an artist at Kurgan studio broadcasting and television.

In 1967, he studied at the Television Artists courses in Leningrad. He was admitted to the Union of Artists of the USSR, now known as the Russian Union of Artists.

In 1968-1969 he participated in the 3rd plenum of the Union of Artists (Moscow).

In 1970 he became a member of the All-Russian Society for Protection of Historical and Cultural Monuments.

In 1972 he participated in the 3rd Congress of Artists (Moscow, Grand Kremlin Palace, the Column Hall of the House of Unions).

In 1973 he was approved as a member of the Kurgan Regional Art Council Executive Committee.

In 1975 he headed the association of young artists at the Kurgan organization of Artists Union.

In 1978 he was approved as a member of the Commission for Watercolors at the Union of Artists.

In 1980 he became a member of the All-Union Society "Knowledge" and was elected a member of the committee of the Union of Artists to work with young artists.

24-27 November 1981 participated in the 5th Congress of Artists (Moscow, Grand Kremlin Palace).

In 1982 he was elected to the Kurgan City Council.

From 1983 to 1990, member of the Board of the USSR Union of Artists.

From 1984 to 1999, Secretary of the Board of the Russian Union of Artists.

In 1998 he took part in the 8th Congress of Russian Artists (Sergiev Posad).

Now Herman Travnikov lives and works in Kurgan, Russia.

== Exhibitions ==
Herman Travnikov participated in more than 150 exhibitions. He held over 50 solo exhibitions in the Urals, in Siberia and other regions of Russia.

Foreign exhibitions:

1971 4th "Painting Biennial of the socialist countries" (Poland, Szczecin). He was awarded a bronze medal.

1971 Exhibition "Soviet Watercolor" (Czechoslovakia).

1972 Exhibition "Soviet Watercolor" (Yugoslavia, Belgrade).

1974 International Art Exhibition "Osiek - 74" (Poland, Koszalin).

1974 Exhibition "Soviet Watercolor" (Mongolia, Ulan Bator).

1975 Personal exhibition of watercolor (Poland, Koszalin, Slupsk, Kolobrzeg).

1975 Exhibition "Soviet Watercolor" (Hungary).

1975 Exhibition "Soviet Watercolor" (Bulgaria).

1976 Exhibition "Soviet Watercolor" (Poland).

1976 Exhibition "Soviet Watercolor" (Bulgaria).

1977 Nikola Marinov Exhibition of International Plein Air (Bulgaria, Targovishte).

1977 International Exhibition of animal art (Romania).

1978 Exhibition of Soviet and Polish artists "of the USSR - Poland" (Moscow, Warsaw).

1978 "Landscapes of friendship" Exhibition of Soviet, Hungarian, Polish and Czechoslovak artists (Moscow, Katowice).

1981 Exhibition "Soviet Watercolor" (Bulgaria, Sofia).

1981 Exhibition "Soviet Watercolor" (Cuba, Havana).

1981 Exhibition "Soviet Watercolor" (Egypt, Cairo).

1982 Exhibition of Soviet and Bulgarian artists (Bulgaria, Sofia).

1993 Personal Exhibition of painting with his daughter Julia (Moscow, US Embassy).

1995 International Exhibition "Watercolor" (Iceland, Reykjavik).

1995 Solo Exhibition "Watercolor" (Austria, Vienna).

2001 Personal Exhibition in the US and UK consulates (Ekaterinburg).

2004 Exhibition "Kurgan Artists" (Kazakhstan, Kostanay).

Works by G. Travnikova are in State Tretyakov Gallery, Kurgan, Arkhangelsk, Krasnoyarsk, Turkmen, Karelian art museums, museums in Poland, Bulgaria, Perm, art galleries in Yekaterinburg, Chelyabinsk, Tyumen and other cities. His paintings are in many private collections and institutions around the world. For example, in private collections of Mstislav Rostropovich, the family of former Pakistani Prime Minister Bhutto, connoisseurs of painting in US, Japan, Italy, Australia, Argentina, etc.

== Awards and titles ==
Badge "For services to Polish culture" (1979).

The title of "Honored Artist of the RSFSR" (1982).

Medal "For Labour Valour" (1986).

Medal "In Commemoration of the 850th Anniversary of Moscow" (1997).

The honorary title of the Kurgan region "Honorary Citizen of the Kurgan region" (1 April 2005).

The title "People's Artist of the Russian Federation" (2007).

Herman Travnikov was awarded the Kurgan municipal prize of "Recognition".

== Family ==
Father - Aleksey Antonovich Travnikov, director of forestry Borovljansky

Mother - Evdokia Ivanovna Travnikova, worked in Logistics

Wife (1966) - Strekalovskaya Olga, of Cinema

The eldest daughter - Nika (born 1967), in 1990 graduated from Leningrad State University, Ph.D.

Second daughter - Julia (born 1975), graduated from the Moscow Institute Stroganov, in 1999 admitted to the Moscow Union of Artists

The youngest daughter - Anna (born 1977), graduated from the Polygraph Institute in Moscow.

== Hobbies ==
Music, poetry, travel.

Favorite type of holiday: recreation in nature.

Religious beliefs: Pomorian Old-Orthodox Church.

== Gallery ==
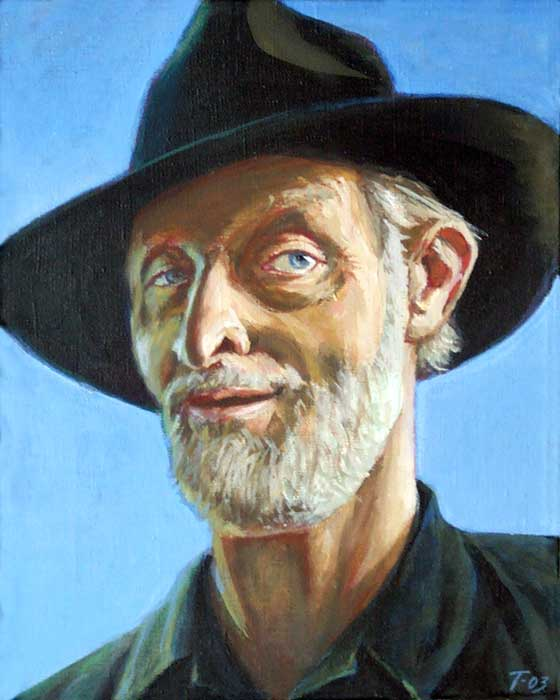
Alter Ego, 2003, acrylic

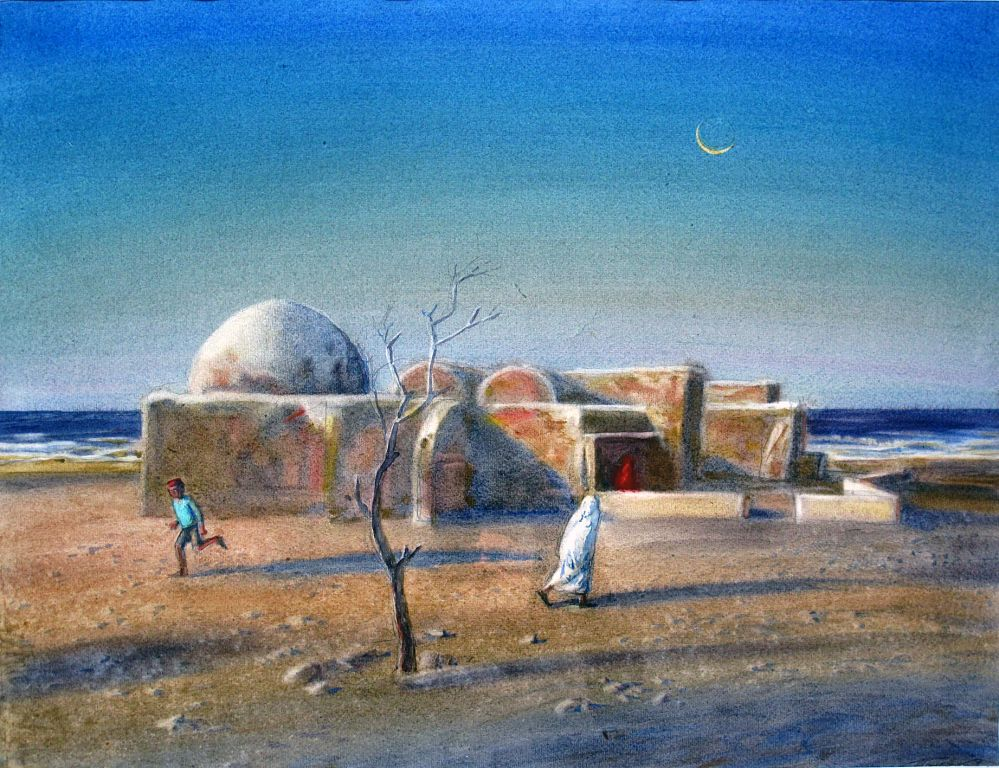
Dry tree, 2010, watercolor

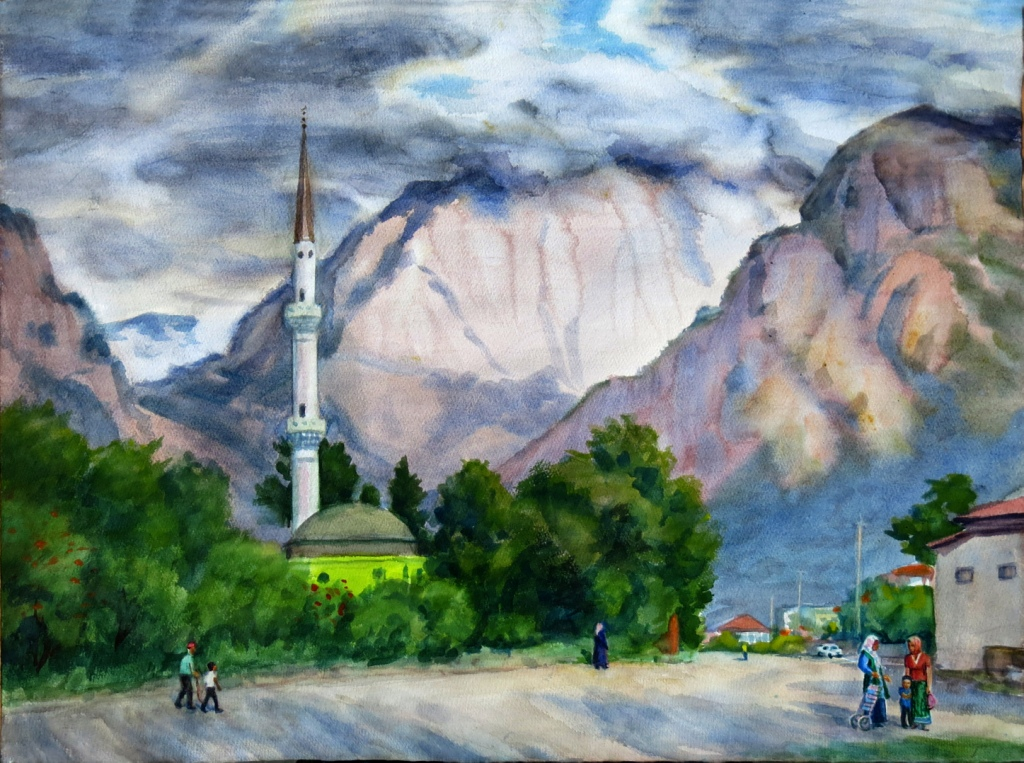
Old mosque, 2013, watercolor

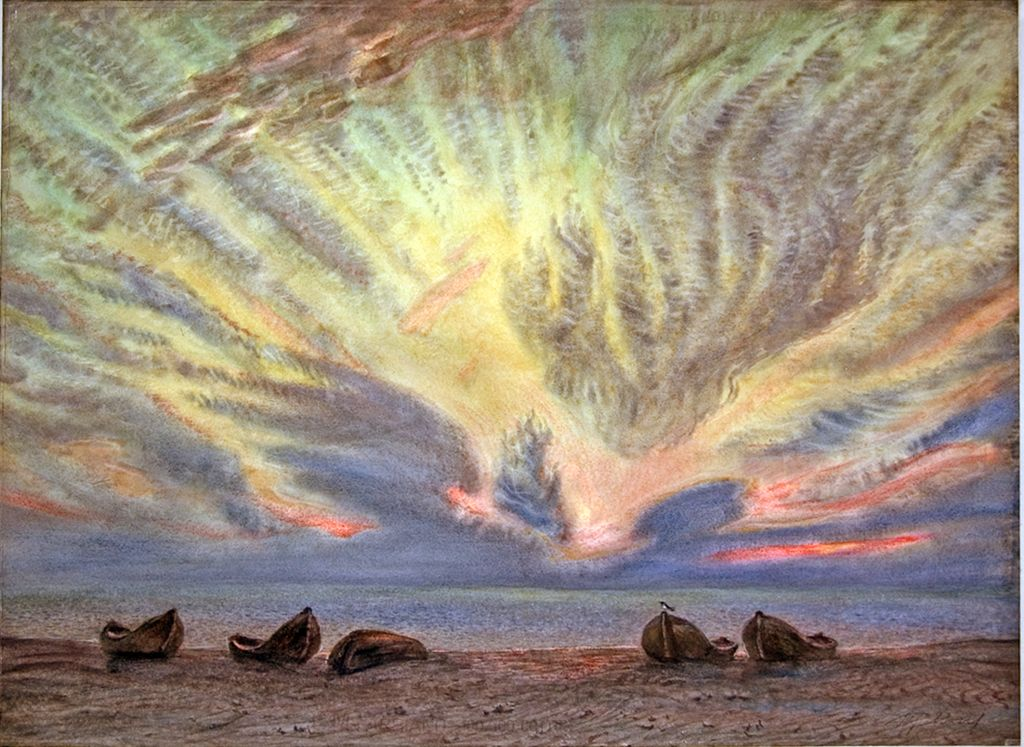
Wind by night, 2007, watercolor

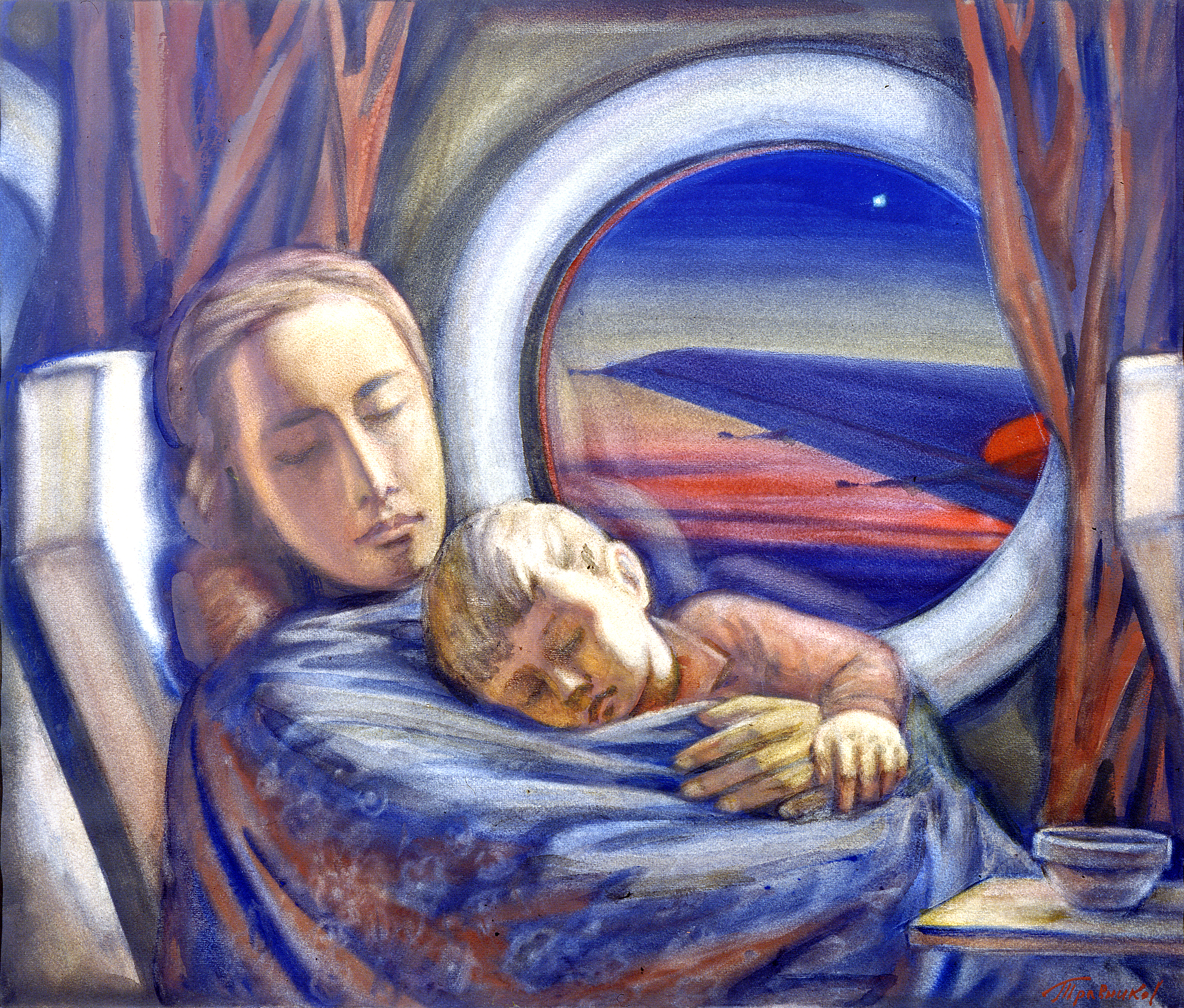
Night flight, 1987, watercolor
