= Ferencvárosi TC in European handball =

Ferencvárosi TC is a Hungarian women's and men's handball club, based in IX. district of Budapest, Hungary.

== Women's team ==
=== European record ===
As of 22 November 2020:

Competition	Seasons	Year(s) in the competition	P	W	D	L	GF	GA	GD
EHF Champions League (Champions Cup)	25x	1967/68, 1969/70, 1970/71, 1972/73, 1994/95, 1995/96, 1996/97, 1997/98, 1999/00, 2000/01, 2001/02, 2002/03, 2003/04, 2006/07, 2007/08, 2009/10, 2012/13, 2013/14, 2014/15, 2015/16, 2016/17, 2017/18, 2018/19, 2019/20, 2020/21	219	118	14	87	5960	5521	+439
EHF Cup	4x	2004/05, 2005/06, 2008/09, 2009/10	25	17	2	6	855	774	+81
EHF Cup Winners' Cup (defunct)	9x	1977/78, 1978/79, 1993/94, 1998/99, 2006/07, 2010/11, 2011/12, 2013/14, 2014/15	65	43	3	19	1871	1480	+391
Source: kézitörténelem.hu	33 seasons		309	178	19	112	8686	7775	+911

=== EHF-organised seasonal competitions ===
Ferencváros women's team score listed first. As of 27 April 2025.

=== Record against other teams ===
Record against other teams in EHF organised competitions. Last updated on 27 April 2025.

Record against other teams
Team	Pld	W	D	L	GF	GA	GD
(Austria) Hypo Niederösterreich	8	2	1	5	210	220	-10
(Austria) Admira Landhaus Wien	2	2	0	0	49	14	+35
(Austria) Union Korneuburg	2	2	0	0	95	41	+54
(Croatia) Podravka Koprivnica	12	11	1	0	365	318	+47
(Croatia) RK Lokomotiva Zagreb	1	1	0	0	26	23	+3
(Cyprus) Kefalovrysos Kythreas	2	0	0	2	151	16	+167
(Czech Republic) DHK Baník Most	2	2	0	0	89	39	+50
(Czechoslovakia) HK Inter Bratislava	2	1	0	1	48	31	+17
(Denmark) GOG Gudme	6	3	1	1	180	163	+17
(Denmark) Ikast Håndbold	7	1	1	5	205	215	-10
(Denmark) HG København	2	1	0	1	18	16	+2
(Denmark) FCK Håndbold	1	0	0	1	20	31	-11
(Denmark) Nykøbing Falster HK	2	2	0	0	68	49	+19
(Denmark) Odense Håndbold	4	2	1	1	106	101	+5
(Denmark) Randers HK	2	0	0	2	52	63	-11
(Denmark) Slagelse FH	4	2	0	2	109	121	-12
(Denmark) Team Esbjerg	11	3	1	7	289	311	-22
(Denmark) Viborg HK	18	9	0	9	494	510	+18
(France) Brest Bretagne Handball	6	2	0	4	150	155	-5
(France) EC Bordeaux	2	2	0	0	64	25	+39
(France) Fleury Loiret HB	2	1	1	0	64	51	+13
(France) Metz Handball	22	10	2	10	583	571	+12
(France) Toulon Saint-Cyr Var	2	1	0	1	60	50	+10
(East Germany) SC Empor Rostock	2	1	0	1	12	14	-2
(East Germany) TSC Berlin	2	0	0	2	30	40	-10
(Germany) Borussia Dortmund Handball	2	1	1	0	48	46	+2
(Germany) HSG Blomberg-Lippe	2	1	1	0	67	58	+9
(Germany) SG BBM Bietigheim	8	5	0	3	215	227	-12
(Germany) SC Leipzig	12	7	0	5	234	215	+19
(Germany) TuS Walle Bremen	6	1	0	1	141	126	+15
(Germany) Thüringer HC	8	7	1	0	245	219	+26
(Germany) TV Giessen-Lützellinden	4	3	0	1	118	97	+21
(Greece) GAS Anagennisi Artas	6	5	0	1	222	145	+77
(Hungary) Cornexi Alcoa	2	1	0	1	60	61	-1
(Hungary) Érd HC	1	1	0	0	31	24	+7
(Hungary) Győri Audi ETO KC	4	0	2	2	105	135	-30
(Iceland) Fram Reykjavik	2	2	0	0	40	10	+30
(Montenegro) ŽRK Budućnost Podgorica	17	11	1	5	465	439	+26
(Netherlands) SERCODAK Dalfsen	1	1	0	0	33	25	+8
(Netherlands) Visa Swift Roermond	2	2	0	0	44	37	+7
(Netherlands) Westfriesland SEW	4	4	0	0	134	69	+65
(North Macedonia) Kometal D. P. Skopje	6	3	0	3	163	162	+1
(North Macedonia) ŽRK Vardar	4	0	1	3	110	127	-17
(Norway) Bækkelagets SK	2	1	0	1	54	46	+8
(Norway) Byåsen Trondheim	2	1	1	0	46	41	+5
(Norway) Larvik HK	10	6	0	4	286	284	+2
(Norway) Nordstrand 2000 Oslo	2	2	0	0	68	53	+15
(Norway) Skoger IL	2	2	0	0	46	23	+23
(Norway) Storhamar HE	2	2	0	0	53	46	+7
(Norway) Tertnes Bergen	4	4	0	0	158	110	+48
(Norway) Vipers Kristiansand	11	3	1	7	295	333	-38
(Poland) EB Start Elbląg	2	1	0	1	45	41	+4
(Poland) MKS Montex Lublin	6	5	0	1	182	155	+27
(Poland) Zagłębie Lubin	2	2	0	0	70	45	+25
(Portugal) Club Sports da Madeira	6	6	0	0	211	133	+78
(Romania) CSM București	14	5	0	9	381	403	-22
(Romania) Râmnicu Vâlcea	8	2	1	5	201	231	-30
(Romania) C.S. Rulmentul Braşov	2	1	0	1	59	54	+5
(Romania) Gloria Bistrița-Năsăud	2	2	0	0	58	51	+7
(Romania) Minaur Baia Mare	2	1	0	1	45	50	-5
(Romania) Rapid București	2	1	1	0	47	44	+3
(Romania) HC Zalău	2	1	0	1	40	31	+9
(Russia) Astrakhanochka	2	2	0	0	65	51	+14
(Russia) Rotor Volgograd	9	5	0	4	259	234	+25
(Russia) Lada Togliatti	1	1	0	0	27	23	+4
(Russia) Rostov-Don	14	2	2	10	354	383	-29
(Russia) Zvezda Zvenigorod	4	3	0	1	129	119	+10
(Serbia) ŽORK Jagodina	2	2	0	0	75	44	+31
(Slovenia) RK Krim Mercator	19	11	0	8	522	514	+8
(Slovakia) Banovsky HK Gabor	2	2	0	0	85	52	+33
(Slovakia) IUVENTA Michalovce	2	2	0	0	71	48	+23
(Slovakia) HK Slovan Duslo Šaľa	2	1	0	1	67	54	+13
(Soviet Union) Spartak Kyiv	1	0	0	1	9	11	-2
(Soviet Union) Žalgiris Kaunas	2	1	0	1	33	30	+3
(Spain) Alsa Elda Prestigio	2	1	0	1	54	55	-1
(Spain) CB Mar Alicante	2	1	1	0	57	52	+5
(Spain) Ferrobús KU Mislata	4	2	1	1	120	110	+10
(Spain) Mar El Osito L'Eliana	4	1	0	3	111	128	-17
(Switzerland) LC Brühl	1	1	0	0	34	21	+13
(Switzerland) TSV St. Otmar St. Gallen	2	2	0	0	85	31	+54
(Sweden) IK Sävehof	2	2	0	0	65	60	+5
(Sweden) Önnereds HK	2	2	0	0	81	48	+33
(Turkey) Ankara HAVELSAN	2	2	0	0	88	61	+27
(Turkey) Anadolu Uni. Eskişehir	2	2	0	0	66	34	+32
(Ukraine) Motor Zaporizhzhia	4	2	1	1	94	90	+4
(Ukraine) HC Smart	1	1	0	0	27	24	+3
(Socialist Federal Republic of Yugoslavia) RK Osijek	2	1	0	1	33	30	+3

==== Women's European Cup and Champions League ====
Season	Round	Club	Home	Away	Aggregate
1967–68	First round	(East Germany) SC Empor Rostock	7–4	5–10	12–14
1969–70	First round	(East Germany) SC Leipzig	8–7	10–19	18–26
1970–71; Finalist	Round of 16	(East Germany) SC Leipzig	16–9	7–11	23–20
1970–71; Finalist	Quarter-finals	(Iceland) Fram Reykjavik	21–5	19–5	40–10
1970–71; Finalist	Semi-finals	(Denmark) HG København	14–7	4–9	18–16
1970–71; Finalist	Final	(Soviet Union) Spartak Kyiv	9–11		
1972–73	Round of 16	(East Germany) SC Leipzig	8–9	7–11	15–20
1994–95	Play-off round	(Ukraine) Motor Zaporizhzhia	24–20	19–20	43–40
1994–95	Group stage (Group B)	(Croatia) Podravka Koprivnica	26–24	21–21	3rd
1994–95	Group stage (Group B)	(Germany) TuS Walle Bremen	21–22	23–25	3rd
1994–95	Group stage (Group B)	(Netherlands) Visa Swift Roermond	21–17	23–20	3rd
1995–96	First round	(Russia) Rotor Volgograd	23–16	24–26	47–42
1995–96	Play-off round	(France) ASPTT Metz	31–18	25–21	56–39
1995–96	Group stage (Group B)	(Austria) Hypo Niederösterreich	18–18	21–24	2nd
1995–96	Group stage (Group B)	(Denmark) Viborg HK	26–22	25–24	2nd
1995–96	Group stage (Group B)	(Romania) Râmnicu Vâlcea	29–23	26–26	2nd
1996–97	Play-off round	(Portugal) Club Sports da Madeira	23–18	38–13	61–31
1996–97	Group stage (Group D)	(Germany) TuS Walle Bremen	27–16	26–18	1st
1996–97	Group stage (Group D)	(Slovenia) Krim Ljubljana	27–24	20–22	1st
1996–97	Group stage (Group D)	(Greece) GAS Anagennisi Artas	42–16	33–21	1st
1996–97	Quarter-finals	(Norway) Byåsen Trondheim	26–21	20–20	46–41
1996–97	Semi-finals	(Denmark) Viborg HK	19–23	24–27	43–50
1997–98	Play-off round	(Cyprus) Kefalovrysos Kythreas	82–9	69–7	151–16
1997–98	Group stage (Group B)	(Spain) Mar El Osito L'Eliana	28–31	23–30	3rd
1997–98	Group stage (Group B)	(Slovenia) Krim Electa Ljubljana	23–25	24–32	3rd
1997–98	Group stage (Group B)	(France) ASPTT Metz HB	28–20	21–21	3rd
1999–00	Play-off round	(Switzerland) TSV St. Otmar St. Gallen	46–14	39–17	85–31
1999–00	Group stage (Group A)	(Denmark) Viborg HK	34–26	21–27	2nd
1999–00	Group stage (Group A)	(France) ASPTT Metz HB	27–24	19–20	2nd
1999–00	Group stage (Group A)	(North Macedonia) Kometal D. P. Skopje	31–23	24–29	2nd
1999–00	Quarter-finals	(Austria) Hypo Niederösterreich	27–23	21–29	48–52
2000–01	Group stage (Group B)	(Germany) TV Giessen-Lützellinden	32–19	30–24	1st
2000–01	Group stage (Group B)	(Spain) Ferrobús KU Mislata	32–24	27–29	1st
2000–01	Group stage (Group B)	(Norway) Bækkelagets SK	33–23	21–23	1st
2000–01	Quarter-finals	(Russia) Volgograd Aqua	30–22	17–22	47–44
2000–01	Semi-finals	(Denmark) Viborg HK A/S	21–22	21–24	42–46
2001–02; Finalist	Second qualifying round	(Germany) TV Giessen-Lützellinden	32–25	24–29	56–54
2001–02; Finalist	Group stage (Group C)	(Denmark) Viborg HK A/S	29–23	30–34	2nd
2001–02; Finalist	Group stage (Group C)	(Austria) Hypo Niederösterreich	27–25	32–33	2nd
2001–02; Finalist	Group stage (Group C)	(Spain) Ferrobús KU Mislata	30–26	31–31	2nd
2001–02; Finalist	Quarter-finals	(Poland) MKS Montex Lublin	25–23	31–32	56–55
2001–02; Finalist	Semi-finals	(Federal Republic of Yugoslavia) Bud. Brillant Podgorica	32–32	32–31	64–63
2001–02; Finalist	Finals	(North Macedonia) Kometal D. P. Skopje	27–25	22–26	49–51
2002–03	Group stage (Group B)	(Denmark) Viborg HK A/S	32–20	26–34	2nd
2002–03	Group stage (Group B)	(Norway) Nordstrand 2000, Oslo	35–22	33–31	2nd
2002–03	Group stage (Group B)	(Germany) HC Leipzig	35–27	31–27	2nd
2002–03	Quarter-finals	(Spain) El Osito L'Eliana Valencia	34–32	26–35	60–67
2003–04	Second qualifying round	(Greece) GAS Anagennisi Artas	38–24	25–30	63–54
2003–04	Group stage (Group D)	(Spain) Alsa Elda Prestigio	30–26	24–29	2nd
2003–04	Group stage (Group D)	(Norway) Larvik HK	29–26	22–29	2nd
2003–04	Group stage (Group D)	(Poland) KS Bystrzyca Lublin	32–24	28–27	2nd
2003–04	Quarter-finals	(Denmark) Slagelse FH	30–28	25–32	55–60
2006–07	Second qualifying round	(Romania) C.S. Rulmentul Braşov	30–24	29–30	59–54
2006–07	Group stage (Group D)	(Austria) Hypo Niederösterreich	34–36	30–32	3rd CWC
2006–07	Group stage (Group D)	(North Macedonia) RK Kometal Gjorče Petrov	31–28	28–31	3rd CWC
2006–07	Group stage (Group D)	(Denmark) Slagelse DT	26–34	28–27	3rd CWC
2007–08	Group stage (Group D)	(Montenegro) Budućnost T-Mobile	36–28	19–22	4th
2007–08	Group stage (Group D)	(Denmark) Viborg HK A/S	30–37	30–39	4th
2007–08	Group stage (Group D)	(Romania) C.S. Oltchim Rm. Vâlcea	22–32	28–34	4th
2009–10	Second qualification tournament (Group 3)	(Ukraine) HC Smart	27–24		2nd EHF
2009–10	Second qualification tournament (Group 3)	(Denmark) FCK Håndbold	20–31		2nd EHF
2009–10	Second qualification tournament (Group 3)	(Switzerland) LC Brühl Handball	34–21		2nd EHF
2012–13	Qualification tournament	(Slovakia) IUVENTA Michalovce	31–22	40–26	71–48
2012–13	Group stage (Group C)	(Norway) Larvik HK	28–24	23–30	2nd
2012–13	Group stage (Group C)	(Sweden) IK Sävehof	31–28	34–32	2nd
2012–13	Group stage (Group C)	(Russia) Dinamo Volgograd	30–28	37–21	2nd
2012–13	Main round (Group 2)	(Romania) Oltchim Rm. Vâlcea	23–30	23–22	3rd
2012–13	Main round (Group 2)	(Russia) Zvezda Zvenigorod	35–34	27–30	3rd
2012–13	Main round (Group 2)	(Slovenia) RK Krim Ljubljana	30–26	25–31	3rd
2013–14	Second qualification tournament (Group 2)	(Croatia) RK Lokomotiva Zagreb	26–23		1st
2013–14	Second qualification tournament (Group 2)	(Hungary) Érd	31–24		1st
2013–14	Group stage (Group B)	(Montenegro) Budućnost	27–25	21–29	3rd CWC
2013–14	Group stage (Group B)	(Denmark) FC Midtjylland	25–26	23–32	3rd CWC
2013–14	Group stage (Group B)	(Poland) MKS Selgros Lublin	40–25	26–24	3rd CWC
2014–15	Qualification tournament (Group 1)	(Netherlands) SERCODAK Dalfsen	33–25		2nd CWC
2014–15	Qualification tournament (Group 1)	(Germany) HC Leipzig	34–34 (4-5 p)		2nd CWC
2015–16	Group stage (Group B)	(Germany) Thüringer HC	32–28	30–27	1st
2015–16	Group stage (Group B)	(Croatia) RK Podravka Koprivnica	28–16	27–24	1st
2015–16	Group stage (Group B)	(France) Fleury Loiret Handball	36–23	28–28	1st
2015–16	Main round (Group 1)	(Russia) Rostov-Don	29–29	21–23	3rd
2015–16	Main round (Group 1)	(Norway) Larvik	30–27	31–37	3rd
2015–16	Main round (Group 1)	(Romania) HCM Baia Mare	21–18	24–32	3rd
2015–16	Quarter-finals	(Hungary) Győri Audi ETO KC	18–31	23–40	41–71
2016–17	Group stage (Group B)	(North Macedonia) ŽRK Vardar	24–37	27–27	2nd
2016–17	Group stage (Group B)	(Russia) Astrakhanochka	32–23	33–28	2nd
2016–17	Group stage (Group B)	(Germany) HC Leipzig	26–22	30–17	2nd
2016–17	Main round (Group 1)	(Montenegro) Budućnost	23–24	33–25	2nd
2016–17	Main round (Group 1)	(France) Metz Handball	29–23	28–25	2nd
2016–17	Main round (Group 1)	(Germany) Thüringer HC	32–24	29–29	2nd
2016–17	Quarter-finals	(Romania) CSM București	26–27	25–30	51–57
2017–18	Group stage (Group C)	(North Macedonia) ŽRK Vardar	28–29	31–34	2nd
2017–18	Group stage (Group C)	(Norway) Larvik	37–33	30–21	2nd
2017–18	Group stage (Group C)	(Germany) Thüringer HC	28–25	29–25	2nd
2017–18	Main round (Group 1)	(France) Metz Handball	29–27	25–27	3rd
2017–18	Main round (Group 1)	(Montenegro) Budućnost	34–26	24–23	3rd
2017–18	Main round (Group 1)	(Germany) SG BBM Bietigheim	31–22	23–27	3rd
2017–18	Quarter-finals	(Russia) Rostov-Don	29–31	22–32	51–63
2018–19	Group stage (Group D)	(Romania) CSM București	28–34	31–36	3rd
2018–19	Group stage (Group D)	(Norway) Vipers Kristiansand	27–26	27–35	3rd
2018–19	Group stage (Group D)	(Germany) SG BBM Bietigheim	33–30	28–25	3rd
2018–19	Main round (Group 2)	(Hungary) Győri Audi ETO KC	32–32	32–32	3rd
2018–19	Main round (Group 2)	(Slovenia) RK Krim Mercator	31–27	25–23	3rd
2018–19	Main round (Group 2)	(Germany) Thüringer HC	30–29	35–32	3rd
2018–19	Quarter-finals	(Russia) Rostov-Don	26–29	22–33	48–62
2019–20	Group stage (Group A)	(France) Metz Handball	28–34	24–24	3rd
2019–20	Group stage (Group A)	(Norway) Vipers Kristiansand	29–34	22–31	3rd
2019–20	Group stage (Group A)	(Croatia) RK Podravka Koprivnica	37–31	27–26	3rd
2019–20	Main round (Group 1)	(Russia) Rostov-Don	31–35	26–29	6th
2019–20	Main round (Group 1)	(Denmark) Team Esbjerg	26–25	27–29	6th
2019–20	Main round (Group 1)	(Romania) CSM București	33–23	24–27	6th
2020–21	Group stage (Group A)	(France) Metz Handball	32-30	29-30	4th
2020–21	Group stage (Group A)	(Russia) Rostov-Don	25–26	24-26	4th
2020–21	Group stage (Group A)	(Norway) Vipers Kristiansand	30-28	31-26	4th
2020–21	Group stage (Group A)	(Denmark) Team Esbjerg	24-28	24–21	4th
2020–21	Group stage (Group A)	(Romania) CSM București	31-27	19–25	4th
2020–21	Group stage (Group A)	(Germany) SG BBM Bietigheim	24–35	29–25	4th
2020–21	Group stage (Group A)	(Slovenia) RK Krim	32–25	32-26	4th
2020–21	Quarter-finals	(Montenegro) ŽRK Budućnost	29-28	19-22	48-50
2021–22	Group stage (Group A)	(Russia) Rostov-Don	25–25	20-19	3rd
2021–22	Group stage (Group A)	(Denmark) Team Esbjerg	31-31	27–33	3rd
2021–22	Group stage (Group A)	(France) Brest Bretagne	28-27	25-30	3rd
2021–22	Group stage (Group A)	(Romania) CSM București	31-30	21-27	3rd
2021–22	Group stage (Group A)	(Germany) BV Borussia 09 Dortmund	25–25	23-21	3rd
2021–22	Group stage (Group A)	(Montenegro) Budućnost BEMAX	26-22	30-26	3rd
2021–22	Group stage (Group A)	(Croatia) HC Podravka Vegeta	33-26	33-29	3rd
2021–22	Playoffs	(Slovenia) RK Krim Mercator	26-22	26-33	52-55
2022–23; Finalist	Group stage (Group A)	(Norway) Vipers Kristiansand	26-26	26-27	4th
2022–23; Finalist	Group stage (Group A)	(Denmark) Odense Håndbold	27-23	28–25	4th
2022–23; Finalist	Group stage (Group A)	(Romania) CSM București	29-33	24-30	4th
2022–23; Finalist	Group stage (Group A)	(Germany) SG BBM Bietigheim	28-23	20-40	4th
2022–23; Finalist	Group stage (Group A)	(France) Brest Bretagne Handball	20-21	21-24	4th
2022–23; Finalist	Group stage (Group A)	(Slovenia) RK Krim	37-26	32-30	4th
2022–23; Finalist	Group stage (Group A)	(Czech Republic) DHK Baník Most	43-19	46-20	4th
2022–23; Finalist	Playoffs	(Montenegro) Budućnost BEMAX	27-22	28-24	55–46
2022–23; Finalist	Quarter-finals	(France) Metz Handball	26-32	33–26	59–58
2022–23; Finalist	Semifinal	(Denmark) Team Esbjerg	30–29		
2022–23; Finalist	Final	(Norway) Vipers Kristiansand	24–28		
2023–24	Group B	(Denmark) Team Esbjerg	28–33	23–27	6th
2023–24	Group B	(France) Metz Handball	25–38	24–25	6th
2023–24	Group B	(Norway) Vipers Kristiansand	27–35	26–37	6th
2023–24	Group B	(Romania) CS Rapid București	24–24	23–20	6th
2023–24	Group B	(Slovenia) RK Krim Mercator	26–28	26–32	6th
2023–24	Group B	(Poland) Zagłębie Lubin	35–22	35–23	6th
2023–24	Group B	(Denmark) Ikast Håndbold	37–36	28–28	6th
2023–24	Playoffs	(France) Brest Bretagne Handball	28-30	31-26	59–56
2023–24	Quarter-finals	(Denmark) Team Esbjerg	25-26	24-29	49–55
2024–25	Group stage Group A	(France) Metz Handball	23–26	19–24	2nd
2024–25	Group stage Group A	(Romania) CSM București	31–28	28–26	2nd
2024–25	Group stage Group A	(Slovenia) RK Krim Mercator	28–26	27–22	2nd
2024–25	Group stage Group A	(Norway) Storhamar HE	26–25	27–21	2nd
2024–25	Group stage Group A	(Denmark) Nykøbing Falster Håndboldklub	31–22	34–27	2nd
2024–25	Group stage Group A	(Croatia) HC Podravka Vegeta	33–24	30–29	2nd
2024–25	Group stage Group A	(Romania) Gloria Bistrița-Năsăud	32–28	26–23	2nd
2024–25	Quarter-finals	(Denmark) Odense Håndbold	24–25	27–27	51–52
2025–26	Group B	(Romania) CSM București			
2025–26	Group B	(Denmark) Odense Håndbold	32–34		
2025–26	Group B	(France) Brest Bretagne Handball			
2025–26	Group B	(Norway) Sola HK			
2025–26	Group B	(Slovenia) RK Krim Mercator			
2025–26	Group B	(Croatia) RK Podravka Koprivnica			
2025–26	Group B	(Denmark) Ikast Håndbold			

==== Women's EHF Cup ====
Season	Round	Club	Home	Away	Aggregate
2004–05	Third round	(Sweden) Önnereds HK	43–21	38–27	81–48
2004–05	Round of 16	(Greece) GAS Anagennisi Artas	40–33	44–21	84–54
2004–05	Quarter-finals	(Denmark) GOG Gudme	31–30	32–32	63–62
2004–05	Semi-finals	(Hungary) Cornexi Alcoa	29–31	31–30	60–61
2005–06; Winner	Third round	(Portugal) Madeira Andebol SAD	46–26	33–22	79–48
2005–06; Winner	Round of 16	(Turkey) Ankara HAVELSAN	42–29	46–32	88–61
2005–06; Winner	Quarter-finals	(Denmark) GOG Svendborg Gudme	31–23	29–30	60–53
2005–06; Winner	Semi-finals	(Ukraine) HC Motor Zaporizhzhia	24–23	27–27	51–50
2005–06; Winner	Final	(Croatia) Podravka Vegeta, Koprivnica	37–36	33–32	70–68
2008–09	Second round	(Slovakia) HK Slovan Duslo Šaľa	41–23	26–31	67–54
2008–09	Third round	(Portugal) Madeira Andebol SAD	38–29	33–25	71–54
2008–09	Round of 16	(Russia) Dinamo Volgograd	29–35	0–0	29–35
2009–10	Third round	(Denmark) Randers HK A/S	25–30	27–33	52–63

==== Women's Cup Winners' Cup ====
From the 2016–17 season, the women's competition was merged with the EHF Cup.

Season	Round	Club	Home	Away	Aggregate
1977–78; Winner	Round of 16	(Austria) Admira Landhaus Wien	22–5	27–9	49–14
1977–78; Winner	Quarter-finals	(France) EC Bordeaux	39–11	25–14	64–25
1977–78; Winner	Semi-finals	(Czechoslovakia) Inter Bratislava	29–11	19–20	48–31
1977–78; Winner	Final	(East Germany) SC Leipzig	18–17		
1978–79; Finalist	Round of 16	(Norway) Skoger IL	28–13	18–10	46–23
1978–79; Finalist	Quarter-finals	(Socialist Federal Republic of Yugoslavia) RK Osijek	14–17	19–13	33–30
1978–79; Finalist	Semi-finals	(Soviet Union) Žalgiris Kaunas	19–13	14–17	33–30
1978–79; Finalist	Finals	(East Germany) TSC Berlin	15–20	15–20	30–40
1993–94; Finalist	Round of 16	(Turkey) Anadolu Uni. Eskişehir	42–17	24–17	66–34
1993–94; Finalist	Quarter-finals	(Poland) EB Start Elbląg	25–20	20–21	45–41
1993–94; Finalist	Semi-finals	(Romania) Silcotex Zalău	23–13	17–18	40–31
1993–94; Finalist	Finals	(Germany) TuS Walle Bremen	23–21	21–24	44–45
1998–99	Round of 32	(Netherlands) Zeeman Vastgoed-SEW	32–12	30–17	62–29
1998–99	Round of 16	(Norway) Larvik HK	33–24	23–33	56–57
2006–07	Quarter-finals	(Denmark) GOG Svendborg TGI Gudme	28–19	29–29	57–48
2006–07	Semi-finals	(Romania) C.S. Oltchim RM Valcea	27–28	23–36	50–64
2010–11; Winner	Third round	(Slovakia) Banovsky HK Gabor	53–26	32–26	85–52
2010–11; Winner	Round of 16	(Denmark) Viborg HK	33–32	33–34	66–66 (a)
2010–11; Winner	Quarter-finals	(France) Toulon Saint-Cyr Var Handball	37–26	23–24	60–50
2010–11; Winner	Semi-finals	(France) Metz Handball	27–29	31–27	58–56
2010–11; Winner	Finals	(Spain) C.B. Mar Alicante	34–29	23–23	57–52
2011–12; Winner	Second round	(Austria) Union Korneuburg	51–18	44–23	95–41
2011–12; Winner	Third round	(Netherlands) Westfriesland SEW	38–21	34–19	72–40
2011–12; Winner	Round of 16	(Russia) Rostov-Don	32–23	22–23	54–46
2011–12; Winner	Quarter-finals	(Russia) Zvezda Zvenigorod	32–24	35–31	67–55
2011–12; Winner	Semi-finals	(Russia) Dinamo Volgograd	34–26	35–38	69–64
2011–12; Winner	Finals	(Denmark) Viborg HK	31–30	31–30	62–60
2013–14	Round of 16	(Norway) Tertnes Bergen	40–30	33–27	73–57
2013–14	Quarter-finals	(Denmark) Viborg HK	31–26	32–40	63–66
2014–15	Third round	(Serbia) ŽORK Jagodina	40–23	35–31	75–44
2014–15	Round of 16	(Norway) Tertnes Bergen	44–27	41–26	85–53
2014–15	Quarter-finals	(Germany) HSG Blomberg-Lippe	34–25	33–33	67–58
2014–15	Semi-finals	(Denmark) FC Midtjylland	23–30	29–31	52–61

==== Women's Champions Trophy ====
Season	Round	Club	Result
2002; Third place	Semi-final	(Denmark) Ikast Bording EH (EHF Cup)	30–32
2002; Third place	Bronze match	(Russia) HC Lada Togliatti (Cup Winners' Cup)	27–23
2006; Fourth place	Semi-final	(Slovenia) RK Krim Mercator (Champions League II.)	25–34
2006; Fourth place	Bronze match	(Serbia and Montenegro) ŽRK Budućnost MONET (Cup Winners' Cup)	25–30

== Men's team ==
=== EHF-organised seasonal competitions ===
Ferencváros men's team score listed first. As of 27 April 2025

==== European League ====
Season	Round	Club	Home	Away	Aggregate
2022–23	First Qualifying Round	(Romania) CS Minaur Baia Mare	38–22	36–27	74–49
2022–23	Second Qualifying Round	(Romania) CSA Steaua București	35–31	31–33	66–64
2022–23	Group Stage	(Germany) SG Flensburg-Handewitt	27–27	30–42	4th
2022–23	Group Stage	(Sweden) Ystads IF	37–34	35–35	4th
2022–23	Group Stage	(Iceland) Valur	33–33	39–43	4th
2022–23	Group Stage	(France) PAUC Handball	28–25	30–33	4th
2022–23	Group Stage	(Spain) BM Benidorm	32–33	27–23	4th
2022–23	Last 16	(France) Montpellier Handball	30–36	29–43	59–79
2024–25	Qualifying Round	(Denmark) Bjerringbro-Silkeborg	34–32	27–45	61–77

==== Cup Winners' Cup ====
From the 2012–13 season, the men's competition was merged with the EHF Cup.

Season	Round	Club	Home	Away	Aggregate
2009–10	Third round	(Slovenia) RK Cimos Koper	29–34	22–28	51–62
