= 2003 EHF Women's Cup Winners' Cup =

The 2003 EHF Women's Cup Winners' Cup was the 27th edition of EHF's competition for women's handball national cup champions. It ran from January 4 to May 18, 2003.

ES Besançon became the first French team to win the Cup Winners' Cup, overcoming an away loss by a 2-goals margin in the final against Spartak Kyiv. As of 2013 it is the only post-Soviet appearance in an EHF final of Spartak, which remains the most successful team in European women's handball with 13 European Cups.

== Results ==
Preliminary round January 4–12, 2003
(Serbia and Montenegro) Napredak Kruševac	28	25	53
(Italy) Florgarden Sassari (a)	27	26	53
(Sweden) IFK Skövde	22	22	44
(Poland) Sośnica Gliwice	22	25	47
(Russia) Luch Moscow	35	29	64
(Greece) Makedonikos Saloniki	15	19	34
(Belarus) Druts Belinichi	17	19	36
(Croatia) Lokomotiva Zagreb	39	34	73
(Austria) SSV Dornbirn-Schoren	35	37	72
(Lithuania) Pasvalio Svalia	22	28	50
(Denmark) Kolding IF	37	36	73
(Bulgaria) Etar Veliko Tarnovo	21	15	36
(Azerbaijan) ABU Baku	23	25	48
(Slovenia) Jelovica Skofka Loka	19	26	45
(Cyprus) EN Athienou	20	13	33
(France) ES Besançon	40	45	85
(Germany) Bayer Leverkusen	31	28	59
(Finland) Sparta Helsinki	12	10	22
(Netherlands) Zeeman SEW	29	20	49
(Switzerland) LC Brühl	31	29	60
(Portugal) Juventude Lis	14	15	29
(Romania) Silcotub Zalău	31	27	58
(Turkey) Anadolu Üniversitesi	34	32	66
(Israel) Maccabi-K.S. Holon	15	23	38
(Hungary) Győri Graboplast	41	33	74
(Bosnia and Herzegovina) Željezničar Sarajevo	21	25	46

Round of 16; February 15–23, 2003
(Italy) Florgarden Sassari	24	18	42
(Spain) Elda Prestigio	40	25	65
(Ukraine) Spartak Kyiv	32	26	58
(Poland) Sośnica Gliwice	23	28	51
(Russia) Luch Moscow	28	21	49
(Croatia) Lokomotiva Zagreb	26	25	51
(Austria) SSV Dornbirn-Schoren	19	26	45
(Denmark) Kolding IF	36	37	73
(Azerbaijan) ABU Baku	20	23	43
(France) ES Besançon	28	31	59
(Germany) Bayer Leverkusen	31	32	63
(Switzerland) LC Brühl	19	25	44
(Romania) Silcotub Zalău	27	30	57
(Turkey) Anadolu Üniversitesi	15	22	37
(Russia) HC Rostov-Don	26	17	43
(Hungary) Győri Graboplast	22	25	47

Quarterfinals; March 14–23, 2003
(Spain) Elda Prestigio	29	17	46
(Ukraine) Spartak Kyiv (a)	21	25	46
(Croatia) Lokomotiva Zagreb	25	19	44
(Denmark) Kolding IF	22	26	48
(France) ES Besançon	28	23	51
(Germany) Bayer Leverkusen	27	23	50
(Romania) Silcotub Zalău	24	26	50
(Hungary) Győri Graboplast	22	29	51

Semifinals; April 5–13, 2003
(Ukraine) Spartak Kyiv	27	24	51
(Denmark) Kolding IF	24	24	48
(France) ES Besançon	30	26	56
(Hungary) Győri Graboplast	18	27	45

Final; May 10–18, 2003
(Ukraine) Spartak Kyiv	30	15	45
(France) ES Besançon	27	20	47
