= Cecilie Leganger =

Norwegian handball player (born 1975)

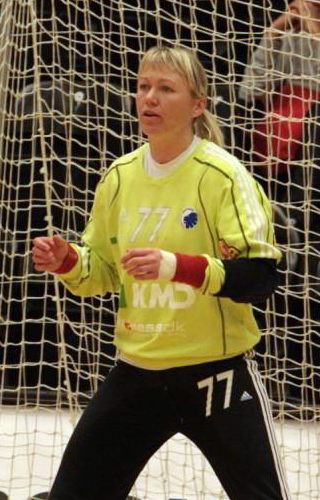
- Leganger playing for FCK Håndbold in 2009

Personal information
- Nationality: Norwegian
- Born: 12 March 1975 (age 51) Bergen, Norway
- Height: 1.81 m (5 ft 11 in)

Sport
- Sport: Handball
- Position: Goalkeeper

Youth career
- Years: Team
- –: Løv-Ham
- –: Fyllingen IL

Senior clubs
- Years: Team
- 1993–1994: Fyllingen IL
- 1994–1996: Tertnes HE
- 1997–2001: Bækkelagets SK
- 2001–2003: Tertnes HE
- 2003–2004: RK Krim
- 2004–2008: Slagelse FH
- 2008–2010: FCK Håndbold
- 2010–2014: Larvik HK
National team
Years	Team	Apps	(Gls)
1993–2004	Norway	162	(1)
Medal record
Olympic Games
Bronze medal – third place	2000 Sydney	Team
World Championship
Gold medal – first place	1999 Denmark/Norway	Team
Silver medal – second place	2001 Italy	Team
Bronze medal – third place	1993 Norway	Team
European Championship
Gold medal – first place	1998 Netherlands	Team
Bronze medal – third place	1994 Germany	Team

Cecilie Leganger (born 12 March 1975) is a Norwegian retired handballer. Regarded as one of the greatest goalkeepers of all time, Leganger won the 1998 European Championship and the 1999 World Championship with the Norwegian national team, and received the IHF World Player of the Year award in 2001.

At club level, Leganger won 27 titles playing for clubs in Norway, Slovenia and Denmark, including three EHF Champions League titles. She made her debut for the Norwegian national team in 1993 at age 17. Leganger was voted the most valuable player at the 1993 World Championship, and included on the All-Star Team of four World Championships (1993, 1995, 1999, 2001) and two European Championships (1994, 1998). Leganger made 162 appearances and scored one goal for the national team until her retirement from international handball in 2004. She was inducted into the European Handball Hall of Fame in 2023.

== Club career ==
Leganger began her senior career at Bergen-based club Fyllingen IL in 1993. In 1994, she transferred to city rivals Tertnes HE. Leganger retired from handball in 1996, before making a comeback a year later with Bækkelagets SK. She won the EHF Cup Winners' Cup and finished runners-up in the EHF Champions Trophy in 1998 and 1999 with the club. Leganger also won the Norwegian Championship in 1999, and the Norwegian Cup in 1999 and 2001. She returned to Tertnes in 2001. Leganger transferred to Slovenian club RK Krim in 2003, where she won the Champions Trophy, the Slovenian Championship and the Slovenian Cup in her only season with the team, in addition to finishing runners-up in the EHF Champions League.

In 2004, Leganger moved to Danish club Slagelse FH, winning the Champions League and Danish Championship in 2005 and 2007, becoming the first Norwegian to win the former. She was voted female Player of the Year in Denmark in 2007. The following year, Leganger transferred to league rivals FCK Håndbold, where she won the Cup Winners' Cup and Danish Cup in 2009. Leganger returned to Norwegian handball with Larvik HK in 2010, winning the Champions League, the Norwegian Championship and the Norwegian Cup in her first season with the club. She finished runners-up in the Champions League with the club in 2013, and won six additional league and cup titles before retiring from handball in 2014.

== International career ==
Leganger made her debut for the Norwegian national team in 1993, at age 17. She appeared at the 1993 World Championship and earned a bronze medal with the national team, in addition to being voted the best goalkeeper and most valuable player of the championship. At the 1994 European Championship, Norway again finished third, while Leganger was included on the All-Star Team as best goalkeeper for a second time. She was voted best goalkeeper for a third consecutive international competition during the 1995 World Championship, where the national team placed fourth. Leganger retired from handball in 1996 and later returned as a club player after a one-year break, but did not play for the national team until 1998. That same year, she won the 1998 European Championship with the Norwegian team and was voted best goalkeeper at an international competition for a fourth time. Leganger and the national team would go on to win the 1999 World Championship, where she was included on the All-Star Team for a fifth time.

The Norwegian national team earned the bronze medal at the 2000 Summer Olympics in Sydney. Leganger declined to play for the national team at the 2000 European Championship due to her university studies in medicine. She returned to the national team for the 2001 World Championship, where Norway finished runners-up as Leganger was voted best goalkeeper of an international competition for a sixth time. She missed the 2002 European Championship, where Norway again finished runners-up, due to injury. At the 2003 World Championship, Leganger and Norway placed sixth. On 27 March 2004, Leganger played her last match with the Norwegian national team before retiring, having made 162 appearances and scored one goal since her debut in 1993.

== Honours ==
=== Club ===
Bækkelagets SK

- EHF Cup Winners' Cup: 1998, 1999
- Norwegian Championship: 1999
- Norwegian Cup: 1999, 2001

RK Krim

- EHF Champions Trophy: 2003
- Slovenian Championship: 2004
- Slovenian Cup: 2004

Slagelse FH

- EHF Champions League: 2005, 2007
- Danish Championship: 2005, 2007

FCK Håndbold

- EHF Cup Winners' Cup: 2009
- Danish Cup: 2009

Larvik HK

- EHF Champions League: 2011
- Norwegian Championship: 2011, 2012, 2013, 2014
- Norwegian Cup: 2010, 2011, 2012, 2013
- Norwegian Playoffs: 2011, 2012, 2013, 2014

=== Individual ===
- IHF World Player of the Year: 2001
- Most Valuable Player (MVP) of the World Championship: 1993
- All-Star Goalkeeper of the World Championship: 1993, 1995, 1999, 2001
- All-Star Goalkeeper of the European Championship: 1994, 1998
- All-Star Goalkeeper of the Norwegian Championship: 1999–2000, 2000–2001, 2001–2002, 2010–2011, 2011–2012
- All-Star Goalkeeper of the Danish Championship: 2004–2005, 2005–2006, 2006–2007, 2007–2008, 2008–2009
- Danish Championship Player of the Year: 2007
- Best Norwegian Female Handball Player of All Time: 2008, 2015
- Best Norwegian National Team Goalkeeper of All Time: 2012
- Håndballstatuetten: 2016
- EHF Hall of Fame in 2023.
- Bækkelagets SK honorary member: 2001

Awards
Preceded by Bojana Radulović	IHF World Player of the Year – Women; 2001	Succeeded by Zhai Chao
