= 2001 EHF Women's Cup Winners' Cup =

The 2001 EHF Women's Cup Winners' Cup was the 25th edition of EHF's competition for women's handball national cup champions. It ran from January 6 to May 13, 2001.

Motor Zaporizhzhia defeated Nordstrand IF in the final to become the first Ukrainian team to win the competition.

== Results ==
Preliminary round January 6–14, 2001
(Israel) Hapoel Petah Tikva	11	14	25
(Spain) Rocasa Remudas	43	42	85
(Romania) Silcotub Zalău	37	33	70
(Portugal) CS Madeira	16	17	33
(Latvia) SK Ulbroka	25	13
(Russia) Kuban Krasnodar	42	41	83
(Germany) TV Mainzlar	36	32
(Belgium) Fémina Visé	22	26	48
(Turkey) Anadolu Üniversitesi	27	20	47
(Serbia and Montenegro) Napredak Kruševac	25	32	57
(Ukraine) Motor Zaporizhzhia	42	35	77
(Poland) Vitaral Jelfa	19	23	42
(Croatia) ŽRK Osijek	33	21	54
(Belarus) Druts Beliniche	21	19	40
(Italy) DeGasperi Enna	12	17	29
(Norway) Nordstrand IF	38	36	74
(Netherlands) AAC 1899 Arnhem	21	15	36
(Bulgaria) Etar Veliko Tarnovo	11	18	29
(Switzerland) TSV Saint Othmar	22	21	43
(France) ES Besançon	34	28	62
(Hungary) Dunaferr Dunaújváros	27	31	58
(Lithuania) Vikas Vilnius	25	15	40
(Slovenia) ZRK Zalec	23	28	51
(Bosnia and Herzegovina) Mladost Banja Luka	17	26	43
(Greece) Filippos Verias	20	13	33
(Austria) WAT Fünfhaus	29	22	51

Round of 16; February 10–18, 2001
(Spain) Rocasa Remudas	23	17	40
(Romania) Silcotub Zalău	19	25	44
(Russia) Kuban Krasnodar	w/o
(Germany) TV Mainzlar
(Serbia and Montenegro) Napredak Kruševac	24	18	42
(Denmark) Ikast Bording	18	23	41
(Ukraine) Motor Zaporizhzhia	32	25	57
(Romania) Rapid Bucharest	17	22	39
(Croatia) ŽRK Osijek	19	14	33
(Norway) Nordstrand IF	23	34	57
(Spain) Elda Prestigio	33	26	59
(Netherlands) AAC 1899 Arnhem	17	21	38
(France) ES Besançon	16	21	37
(Hungary) Dunaferr Dunaújváros	16	20	36
(Slovenia) ZRK Zalec	31	25	56
(Austria) WAT Fünfhaus	21	20	41

Quarterfinals; March 3–10, 2001
(Romania) Silcotub Zalău	29	24	53
(Russia) Kuban Krasnodar	21	21	42
(Serbia and Montenegro) Napredak Kruševac	26	22	48
(Ukraine) Motor Zaporizhzhia	26	39	65
(Norway) Nordstrand IF	29	22	51
(Spain) Elda Prestigio	24	26	50
(France) ES Besançon	28	23	51
(Slovenia) ZRK Zalec	17	30	47

Semifinals; April 1–8, 2001
(Romania) Silcotub Zalău	29	17	46
(Ukraine) Motor Zaporizhzhia	20	28	48
(Norway) Nordstrand IF	28	21	49
(France) ES Besançon	19	22	41

Final; May 6–13, 2001
(Ukraine) Motor Zaporizhzhia	26	23	49
(Norway) Nordstrand IF	20	18	38
