= Crina Pintea =

Romanian handball player (born 1990)

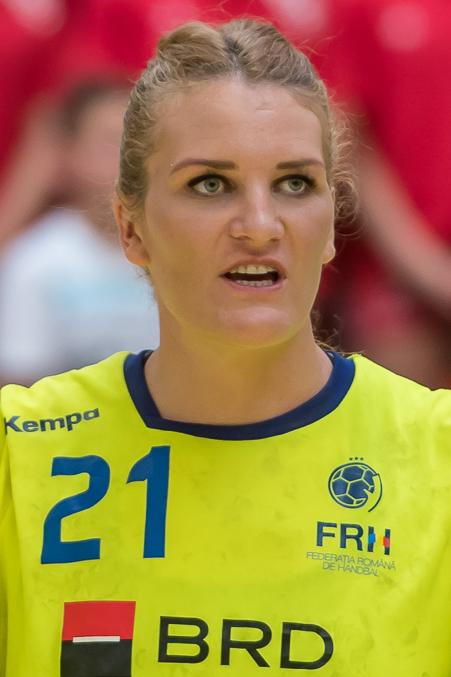
- Pintea in 2017

Personal information
- Full name: Crina Elena Pintea
- Nationality: Romanian
- Born: 3 April 1990 (age 36) Podu Turcului, Romania
- Height: 1.92 m (6 ft 4 in)

Sport
- Sport: Handball
- Position: Line player
- Current club: CSM București
- Number: 77

Youth career
- Years: Team
- 2006–2007: Oltchim Râmnicu Vâlcea
- 2007–2009: ONOE Râmnicu Vâlcea

Senior clubs
- Years: Team
- 2009–2015: HC Zalău
- 2015–2017: Thüringer HC
- 2017–2018: Paris 92
- 2018–2019: Győri ETO KC
- 2019–2021: CSM București
- 2021–2022: Győri ETO KC
- 2022–2027: CSM București
National team
| Years | Team | Apps | (Gls) |
| 2012–2023 | Romania | 79 | (120) |
Medal record
World Championship
| Bronze medal – third place | 2015 Denmark |

Crina Elena Pintea (née Ailincăi; born 3 April 1990) is a Romanian professional handballer who plays as a pivot for CSM București and the Romanian national team.

Considered to be one of the best pivots in the world, in 2019 she was named to the EHF Champions League All-Star Team. In 2018, she was named to the European Championship All-Star Team. Pintea is also regarded by many as one of the best defenders in the world. In recognition of her performances and achievements throughout the year, she was also voted the Romanian Handballer of the Year in 2019.

== Early life ==
Born in Bacău County, in the village of Podu Turcului, she is the oldest of four children. She did not practice seriously any sport until age 16.

== Career ==
Pintea moved to Râmnicu Vâlcea at the age of sixteen and began her career at Oltchim Râmnicu Vâlcea before signing for HC Zalău from the academy at the Centrul Național Olimpic de Excelență Râmnicu Vâlcea (CNOE Râmnicu Vâlcea) in 2009 by Gheorghe Tadici. She was also the runner-up of the 2011–12 EHF Cup competition. In October 2015, following a lengthy dispute over a new contract, she was signed by Thüringer HC. She then went on to help THC win Bundesliga title in the 2015–16 season, and the DHB-Supercup next season as well. A year later, Pintea signed for Paris 92 in France where she was named in the Championnat de France Team of the Year for season 2017–18. She joined Győri ETO KC under Ambros Martín's leadership, and helped the club win treble in 2018–19. Győr allowed Crina Pintea to leave the club at the end of the season, honouring a gentlemen's agreement. In the summer 2019, CSM București announced that they have signed Pintea after only half a year with ETO.

Pintea made her senior debut for Romania in September 2012 after previously being capped by Romania youth team at under-19 level. She was chosen in Romania's squads for the 2013, 2015 and 2017 IHF World Championships and EHF Euro 2012, 2014, 2016 and 2018.

== Achievements ==
National team

- IHF World Championship:
  - Bronze Medalist: 2015

European Competitions

- EHF Champions League:
  - Winner: 2019
- EHF Cup:
  - Finalist: 2012

Domestic Competitions

- Romanian National League:
  - Bronze Medalist: 2015
- Supercupa României:
  - Finalist: 2011
- Bundesliga:
  - Winner: 2016
- DHB-Supercup:
  - Winner: 2016
- Hungarian Championship
  - Winner: 2019, 2022
- Hungarian Cup:
  - Winner: 2019

== Individual awards ==
- Championnat de France Best Pivot: 2018
- Carpathian Trophy Best Defender: 2018
- All-Star Pivot of the European Championship: 2018
- All-Star Pivot of the EHF Champions League: 2019
- Carpathian Trophy MVP: 2019
- Supercupa României MVP: 2019
- Romanian Handballer of the Year: 2019
