= Talida Tolnai =

Romanian handball player (born 1979)

Personal information
- Nationality: (Romania) Romanian
- Born: 21 August 1979 (age 47) Zalău, Romania
- Height: 1.87 m (6 ft 2 in)

Sport
- Sport: Handball
- Position: Goalkeeper

Senior clubs
- Years: Team
- 1995–2007: HC Zalău
- 2007–2012: Oltchim Râmnicu Vâlcea
- 2012–2013: Üsküdar Bld. SK
- 2013–2014: RK Krim
- 2014–2015: CSM București
National team
Years	Team	Apps	(Gls)
–	Romania	111	(1)
Medal record
European Championship
Bronze medal – third place	2010 Denmark & Norway	Team

Talida Tolnai (born 21 August 1979) is a Romanian female handballer. She participated at the 2008 Summer Olympics in China, where the Romanian team placed seventh.

== International honours ==
- EHF Champions League:
  - Finalist: 2010
  - Semifinalist: 2009, 2012
- EHF Champions Trophy:
  - Winner: 2007
- EHF Cup Winners' Cup:
  - Winner: 2007
  - Semifinalist: 2001
- City Cup:
  - Winner: 1996
  - Semifinalist: 1997
- European Championship:
  - Bronze Medallist: 2010
  - Fifth Place: 2008
- World Championship:
  - Fourth Place: 2007
