= Susann Goksør Bjerkrheim =

Norwegian handball player (born 1970)

Personal information
- Nationality: Norwegian
- Born: 7 July 1970 (age 56) Oslo, Norway
- Height: 168 cm (66 in)

Sport
- Sport: Handball
- Position: Centre back

Youth career
- Years: Team
- –: Bækkelagets SK

Senior clubs
- Years: Team
- 1981–1997: Bækkelagets SK
- 1997–2000: Nordstrand IF
- 2008: Nordstrand IF
National team
Years	Team	Apps	(Gls)
1987–2000	Norway	296	(844)
Medal record
Olympic Games
Silver medal – second place	1988 Seoul	Team
Silver medal – second place	1992 Barcelona	Team
Bronze medal – third place	2000 Sydney	Team
World Women's Handball Championship
Bronze medal – third place	1993 Norway	Team
Silver medal – second place	1997 Germany	Team
Gold medal – first place	1999 Denmark/Norway	Team
European Women's Handball Championship
Bronze medal – third place	1994 Germany	Team
Silver medal – second place	1996 Denmark	Team

Susann Goksør Bjerkrheim (née Susann Goksør, 7 July 1970) is a Norwegian former handball player. She is a world champion from 1997, and an honorary member of her club Bækkelagets SK.

== National team ==
She has played in 296 games for the Norwegian National team, scoring 844 goals. Her first game for Norway ws on 17 June 1987 against East Germany. Between 1993 and 2000 she was the captain of the team. She is a World Champion from 1999.

== Club career ==
Goksør played for Bækkelagets SK until 1997. She joined the club aged 11, and made her senior league debut at the age of 15. With Bækkelaget she won the Norwegian Women's Handball Cup in 1994 and 1997. In 1994 she reached the final of the Euro-City-Cup, where Bækkelagets lost to Buxtehuder SV, and in 1995 she reached the final of the EHF Cup, where they lost to Hungarian Debrecen. In 1997 she joined Nordstrand IF. She retired in 2000. In 2008 she made a short comeback, where she played 3 games for Nordstrand IF.

== Private ==
She is married to teacher and handball player Svein-Erik Bjerkrheim. Their son Jonatan Gaksør Bjerkrheim is also a handball player for Drammen HK.

She is a graduate of the Norwegian School of Sport Sciences.

In 2025 Goksør Bjerkrheim was a participant of The Farm Celebrity, a reality show on TV 2. Here she reached the final, but lost to former team mate Kjersti Grini.

== Bibliography ==
- Susan Goksør Bjerkrheim and Rolf Nordberg: God i håndball. Gyldendal Norsk Forlag, Oslo 1999, ISBN 9788247805565.
