= 2001–02 EHF Women's Champions League =

The 2001–2002 EHF Women's Champions League was the 9th edition of the modern era of the EHF's premier competition for women's handball clubs, and the 42nd overall. Kometal GP Skopje won the tournament, which was the first time a Macedonian team had won the title.

== 1st qualifying round ==
Team #1	Agg.	Team #2	1st	2nd
ES Besançon (France)	86–52	(Italy) Dossobuono Verona	43–25	43–27
A.S. Silcotub Zalau (Romania)	69–56	(Netherlands) Zeeman Vastgoed SEW	39–25	30–31
Anadolu Uni Eskisehir (Turkey)	57–45	(Slovenia) M. Degro Piran	30–24	27–21
Eastcon AG Vilnius (Lithuania)	47–46	(Slovakia) RK Slovan Duslo Sala	24–20	23–26
Madeira Andebol SAD (Portugal)	50–64	(Germany) TV Lützellinden	27–32	23–32
Split Kaltenberg (Croatia)	43–54	(Greece) Anagennisi Arta	24–27	19–27
Spono Nottwil (Switzerland)	33–81	(North Macedonia) Kometal GP Skopje	20–42	13–39
Volgograd AKVA (Russia)	64–39	(Belarus) BGPA Minsk	35–23	29–16

== 2nd qualifying round ==
Team #1	Agg.	Team #2	1st	2nd
Bækkelagets SK (Norway)	47–55	(France) ES Besançon	26–24	21–31
A.S. Silcotub Zalau (Romania)	64–46	(Austria) Wiener Neustadt	34–21	30–25
Buducnost Podgorica (Federal Republic of Yugoslavia)	70–43	(Turkey) Anadolu Uni Eskisehir	41–20	29–23
GOG (Denmark)	59–40	(Lithuania) Eastcon AG Vilnius	29–22	30–18
Ferencváros (Hungary)	56–54	(Germany) TV Lützellinden	32–25	24–29
Anagennisi Arta (Greece)	52–66	(Spain) Ferrobus Mislata	24–32	28–34
Kometal GP Skopje (North Macedonia)	60–37	(Serbia) ZORK Napredak Krusevac	27–16	33–21
Volgograd AKVA (Russia)	52–40	(Croatia) RK Podravka Koprivnica	30–18	22–22

== Group stage ==
=== Group A ===
Team	Pld	W	D	L	GF	GA	Pts
(Norway) Larvik HK	6	4	1	1	160	154	9
(Ukraine) HC Motor Zaporizhzhia	6	3	0	3	147	141	6
(Romania) A.S. Silcotub Zalau	6	1	3	2	151	160	5
(France) ES Besançon	6	1	2	3	151	154	4

=== Group B ===
Team	Pld	W	D	L	GF	GA	Pts
(Federal Republic of Yugoslavia) RK Podravka Koprivnica	6	4	0	2	180	165	8
(Spain) Mar El Osito L'Eliana	6	3	0	3	159	166	6
(Hungary) Dunaferr	6	3	0	3	140	139	6
(Denmark) GOG Gudme	6	2	0	4	156	165	2

=== Group C ===
Team	Pld	W	D	L	GF	GA	Pts
(Hungary) Ferencvaros	6	3	1	2	179	172	7
(Spain) Ferrobus Mislata	6	3	1	2	163	167	7
(Austria) Hypo Niederösterreich	6	3	0	3	171	159	6
(Denmark) Viborg HK	6	2	0	4	163	178	4

=== Group D ===
Team	Pld	W	D	L	GF	GA	Pts
(North Macedonia) Kometal GP Skopje	6	4	1	1	158	140	9
(Poland) MKS Montex Lublin	6	3	0	3	160	165	8
(Slovenia) RK Krim	6	3	0	3	148	151	6
(Russia) Volgograd AKVA	6	1	1	4	134	144	4

== Quarter-finals ==
Team #1	Agg.	Team #2	1st	2nd
MKS Montex Lublin (Poland)	55–56	(Hungary) Ferencvaros	32–31	23–25
HC Motor Zaporizhzhia (Ukraine)	48–54	(Federal Republic of Yugoslavia) ŽRK Budućnost Podgorica	26–26	22–28
Mar El Osito L'Eliana (Spain)	49–52	(Norway) Larvik	24–25	25–27
Ferrobus Mislata (Spain)	44–54	(North Macedonia) Kometal GP Skopje	22–32	22–22

== Semi-finals ==
Team #1	Agg.	Team #2	1st	2nd
Ferencvaros (Hungary)	64–63	(Federal Republic of Yugoslavia) ŽRK Budućnost Podgorica	32–32	32–31
Larvik (Norway)	50–50	(North Macedonia) Kometal GP Skopje	29–22	21–28

== Final ==
Team #1	Agg.	Team #2	11.05.2002	19.05.2002
Ferencvaros (Hungary)	49–51	(North Macedonia) Kometal GP Skopje	27–25	22–26

== Top scorers ==
Name	Team	Goals
(Hungary) Agnes Farkas	Ferencvaros	104
(Spain) Natalia Morskova	Mar El Osito L'Eliana	76
(North Macedonia) Natalia Malakhova	Kometal GP Skopje	62
