= Zork (disambiguation) =

Zork is an interactive computer game.

Zork may also refer to:

- Zork (wine), an alternative wine closure
- ŽORK Jagodina, a handball club
- ŽORK Napredak Kruševac, a handball club
