= Gabriella Szűcs (handballer) =

Romanian-Hungarian handball player (born 1984)

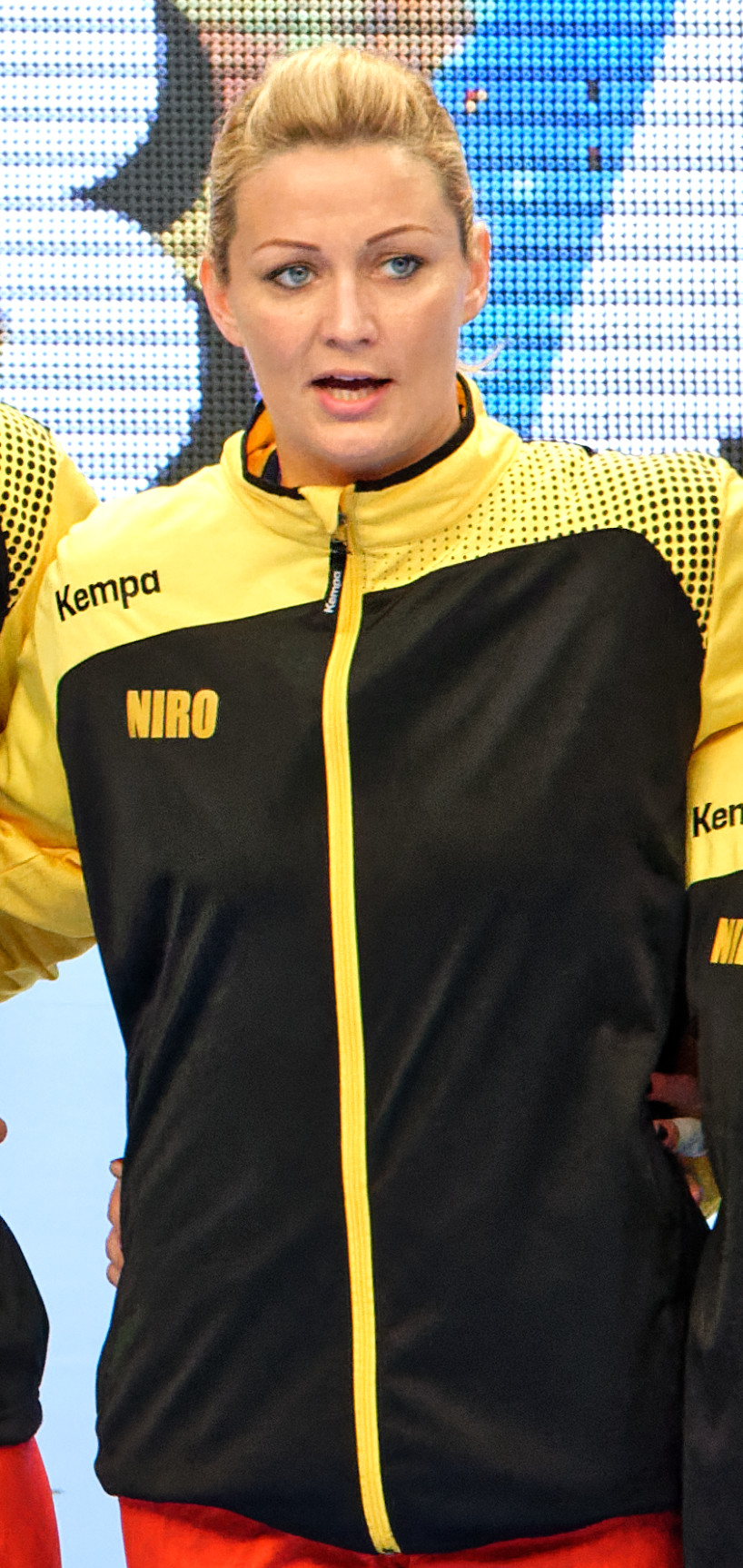
- Szűcs in 2015

Personal information
- Full name: Gabriella Ibolya Szűcs
- Nationality: Hungarian; Romanian
- Born: 31 August 1984 (age 42) Oradea, Romania
- Height: 1.83 m (6 ft 0 in)

Sport
- Sport: Handball
- Position: Left back
- Current club: HC Dunărea Brăila
- Number: 9

Youth career
- Years: Team
- –1999: Debreceni VSC

Senior clubs
- Years: Team
- 1999–2008: Debreceni VSC
- 2008–2011: CS Oltchim Rm. Vâlcea
- 2011: Debreceni VSC
- 2011–2013: HC Zalău
- 2013–2016: HCM Baia Mare
- 2016–2021: HC Dunărea Brăila
National team
Years	Team	Apps	(Gls)
2004–2011	Hungary	96	(144)
2015–	Romania	21	(10)
Medal record
Representing Hungary
World Championship
Bronze medal – third place	2005 Russia	Team
European Championship
Bronze medal – third place	2004 Hungary	Team
Representing Romania
World Championship
Bronze medal – third place	2015 Denmark	Team

Gabriella Ibolya Szűcs (born 31 August 1984) is a Romanian-Hungarian professional handball player for HC Dunărea Brăila and the Romanian national team. Born in the Socialist Republic of Romania to Hungarian parents, Szűcs holds both Hungarian and Romanian citizenship. Initially a Hungarian international, she has represented Romania from 2015.

== Career ==
Born in Oradea in 1984, her family moved to Hungary before the Romanian Revolution and settled in Debrecen. Her father was a professional footballer, whilst her mother was a handball player, which could have a great influence on that Gabriella started to practice various sports since a very young age. First she tried rhythmic gymnastics later switched to folk dance. In the school she was talented in many sports including basketball and football, but finally she has chosen handball.

She started to play handball at the age of eleven, and whilst in school she already had seven trainings a week. At the age of fourteen she was signed by DVSC, where she spent the next ten seasons. During this time she developed to a quality left back both on domestic and international level. With the Hungarian national team she won bronze medal on the European Championship in 2004, and a year later on the World Championship as well. She was also member of the team which finished fourth on the Olympic Games in Beijing. In 2009, she moved to Romanian top club CS Oltchim Râmnicu Vâlcea, where she spent two season before re-joined her old club DVSC.

Her second spell at the club, however, was cut short after DVSC faced heavy financial problems and let many of their key players to go to axe their wage budget. Szűcs remained by the club until December 2011, when she moved to the Romanian Championship again, this time to HC Zalău, where she joined her former coach Gheorghe Tadici.

== Personal life ==
She has a younger sister, Nikolett, who was also a professional handball player.

== Achievements ==
- World Championship:
  - Bronze Medalist: 2005
- European Championship:
  - Bronze Medalist: 2004
- Youth European Championship:
  - Bronze Medalist: 2001
- Junior World Championship:
  - Silver Medalist: 2003
- Junior European Championship:
  - Silver Medalist: 2002
- Hungarian Cup:
  - Bronze Medalist: 2001, 2008
- Romanian Championship:
  - Winner: 2009, 2010, 2014
  - Silver Medalist: 2013, 2015
- Romanian Cup:
  - Winner: 2013, 2014, 2015
- Romanian Supercup:
  - Winner: 2013, 2014, 2015
- EHF Champions League:
  - Finalist: 2010
  - Semifinalist: 2009
- EHF Cup:
  - Finalist: 2012
  - Semifinalist: 2006, 2013
