= Siv Heim Sæbøe =

Norwegian handball player (born 1973)

Personal information
- Nationality: Norwegian
- Born: 25 March 1973 (age 53)

Sport
- Sport: Handball
- Position: Pivot

Senior clubs
- Years: Team
- 1992-2002: Bækkelagets SK
- 2002-2006: Cercle Dijon Bourgogne
- 2006-2007: Lunner IL
National team
Years	Team	Apps	(Gls)
1998–1999	Norway	14	(19)
Medal record
Representing Norway
Women's handball
European Championship
Gold medal – first place	1998 Netherlands	Team

Siv Heim Sæbøe (born 25 March 1973) is a Norwegian team handball player who played for the club Bækkelagets SK and on the Norway women's national handball team. She became European champion in 1998.

Sæbøe made her debut on the national team in 1998, and her position was pivot/line player.
