= 1997–98 EHF Women's Cup Winners' Cup =

National handball championship held in 1997-1998

The 1997–98 EHF Women's Cup Winners' Cup was the 22nd edition of EHF's competition for women's handball national cup champions. It ran from October 2, 1997, to May 16, 1998.

1995 EHF Cup runner-up Bækkelagets SK defeated Kras Zagreb, which lost the final for the second time in three years, to become the first Norwegian women's team to win an EHF/IHF competition.

== Results ==
Preliminary round October 2–12, 1997
(Israel) Maccabi Holon	13	19	32
(Serbia and Montenegro) Napredak Kruševac	49	44	93
(Spain) Corteblanco Bidebieta	32	27	59
(Denmark) Frederikshavn fI	29	34	63
(Greece) ASB Athinaikos	11	9	20
(Croatia) Kras Zagreb	27	33	60
(Bulgaria) Etar Veliko Tarnovo	28	16	44
(North Macedonia) Zora Gevgelija	21	25	46
(Portugal) Infante Madeira	21	20	41
(Ukraine) Avtomobilist Brovary	37	34	71
(Belgium) Arena Hechtel	21	16	37
(Switzerland) TSV Saint Othmar	24	24	48
(Austria) UHC Stockerau	21	20	41
(Slovakia) Plastika Nitra	22	27	49
(Romania) Silcotub Zalău	24	16	40
(Hungary) Vasas Budapest	15	22	37
(Netherlands) SEW Zeeman	54	52	106
(Italy) Polisportiva Cingoli	10	17	27
(Turkey) Anadolu Üniversitesi	24	24	48
(Poland) Jaroslawski KS	23	26	49
(Luxembourg) HC Bascharage	12	4	16
(France) ES Besançon	33	31	64
(Slovenia) Olimpija Ljubljana	24	21	45
(Norway) Bækkelagets SK	23	33	56
(Belarus) Universitet Gomel	22	25	47
(Czech Republic) Novesta Zlín	35	26	61

Round of 16; November 7–16, 1997
(Serbia and Montenegro) Napredak Kruševac	31	26	57
(Denmark) Frederikshavn fI	23	28	51
(Croatia) Kras Zagreb	39	34	73
(North Macedonia) Zora Gevgelija	12	18	30
(Ukraine) Avtomobilist Brovary	36	24	60
(Switzerland) TSV Saint Othmar	18	24	42
(Germany) Borussia Dortmund	37	35	72
(Slovakia) Plastika Nitra	19	32	51
(Romania) Silcotub Zalău	33	33	66
(Netherlands) SEW Zeeman	22	18	40
(Russia) Luch Moscow	23	26	49
(Poland) Jaroslawski KS	15	23	38
(Russia) Kuban Krasnodar	33	19	52
(France) ES Besançon	22	26	48
(Norway) Bækkelagets SK	29	25	54
(Czech Republic) Novesta Zlín	16	21	37

Quarterfinals; February 21 – March 1, 1998
(Serbia and Montenegro) Napredak Kruševac	24	22	46
(Croatia) Kras Zagreb	23	26	49
(Ukraine) Avtomobilist Brovary	25	23	48
(Germany) Borussia Dortmund	35	39	74
(Romania) Silcotub Zalău	26	14	40
(Russia) Luch Moscow	13	22	35
(Russia) Kuban Krasnodar	24	19	43
(Norway) Bækkelagets SK	19	28	47

Semifinals; April 5–12, 1998
(Croatia) Kras Zagreb	32	21	53
(Germany) Borussia Dortmund	24	27	51
(Romania) Silcotub Zalău	22	17	39
(Norway) Bækkelagets SK	27	32	59

Final; May 9–16, 1998
(Croatia) Kras Zagreb	23	17	40
(Norway) Bækkelagets SK	23	28	51
