= Tertnes IL =

Norwegian sports club

- Founded: 25 January 1953; 72 years ago
- Ground: Åsane Arena, Bergen
- Capacity: 2,220
Home colours

Tertnes Idrettslag is a Norwegian multi-sports club from Bergen, founded on 25 January 1953.

Active in athletics, football, gymnastics, handball and mountaineering, it is best known for its women's handball team. When it was founded the club only had handball, football and gymnastics on the program.

== Handball ==
The club has two sections for handball, the elite section named Tertnes Håndball Elite and a grassroots section.

The women's handball team quickly became the flagship of Tertnes, when they in 1992 managed to qualify for the Norwegian top division, Eliteserien. They had been promoted from the 3rd tier to the 2nd tier in 1987. The team has played in the highest league since its promotion in 1992, and has won silver four times (1998/99, 2003/04, 2005/06 and 2008/09) and appeared in the cup final 3 times, placing second all times (2001/02, 2013 and 2016).

Former players include Cecilie Leganger, Kjersti Grini, Mette Davidsen, Mia Hundvin, Stine Skogrand, Terese Pedersen, Linn Gossé and Sakura Hauge.

== Football ==
The men's football team plays in the Fourth Division, the fourth tier of Norwegian football, having played in the Third Division from 2008 through 2016.
