= Carmen Mican =

Romanian handball coach and player (born 1966)

Personal information
- Nationality: Romanian
- Born: 2 October 1966 (age 60) Dej, SR Romania

Sport
- Sport: Handball
- Position: Pivot

Senior clubs
- Years: Team
- 1983–1984: CS Gloria Bistrița
- 1984–1998: HC Zalău
- 1998–2000: RAAL Bistrița

Carmen Mican (born 2 October 1966) is a Romanian handball coach and former handball player.

== Biography ==
She was born in Dej, Romania, on 2 October 1966. She started playing handball at the sports school in Dej, and in 1983 she joined Romanian handball club CS Gloria Bistrița. The next year she was transferred to HC Zalău, where she played for 12 years. Most of her 12 years at Zalău were spent in the Romanian first league. She was part of the Zalău team who won their historic Women's EHF European Cup in 1996.

In 1998 RAAL Bistrița's coach Iuliu Crăciun became interested in her, and she moved there in the same year. In 2000 she replaced Crăciun as the team's head coach, and remained the club's head coach until 2002.

Mican graduated from the Institute of Physical Education and Sport in Bucharest, a school for coaches and referees.

== Honours ==
HC Zalău

- EHF Challenge Cup: 1996
- EHF Cup semi-finalist: 1992
- Liga Naţională runner-up: 1994, 1996, 1997, 1998
- Cupa României runner-up: 1993, 1996, 1997, 1998
