= 1998 European Women's Handball Championship =

3rd edition of the European Women's Handball Championship

1998 EHF European Women's Handball Championship

Tournament details
- Host country: Netherlands
- Venues: 2 (in 2 host cities)
- Dates: 11–20 December
- Teams: 12 (from 1 confederation)

Final positions
- Champions: Norway (1st title)
- Runners-up: Denmark
- Third place: Hungary
- Fourth place: Austria

Tournament statistics
- Matches played: 38
- Goals scored: 1,858 (48.89 per match)
- Top scorer: (Austria) Ausra Fridrikas (68 goals)

Awards
- Best player: (Norway) Trine Haltvik

The 1998 EHF European Women's Handball Championship was the third edition of the European Women's Championship. It was held in the Netherlands from 11 to 20 December. It was won by Norway after beating Denmark 24–16 in the final match. This was the first time Norway won the title, after Denmark had won the first two titles.

== Venues ==
The tournament was held in the following cities:

- Amsterdam
- 's-Hertogenbosch

== Qualification ==
Country	Qualified as	Previous appearances in tournament
Netherlands	Host	0 (Debut)
Denmark	Defending champion	2 (**1994**, **1996**)
Austria	Winner of group 1	2 (1994, 1996)
Russia	Runner-up of group 1	2 (1994, 1996)
Hungary	Winner of group 2	2 (1994, 1996)
Germany	Runner-up of group 2	2 (1994, 1996)
Norway	Winner of group 3	2 (1994, 1996)
Spain	Runner-up of group 3	0 (Debut)
Poland	Winner of group 4	1 (1996)
Romania	Runner-up of group 4	2 (1994, 1996)
Ukraine	Winner of group 5	2 (1994, 1996)
Macedonia	Runner-up of group 5	0 (Debut)

Note: Bold indicates champion for that year. Italic indicates host for that year.

== Preliminary round ==
=== Group A ===
Pos	Team	Pld	W	D	L	GF	GA	GD	Pts	Qualification
1	Austria	5	4	0	1	134	118	+16	8 (Note: Austria 2 Pts, +4 GD; Hungary 2 Pts, +2 GD; Germany 2 Pts, –6 GD)	Semifinals
2	Hungary	5	4	0	1	131	109	+22	8	Semifinals
3	Germany	5	4	0	1	117	119	−2	8	Fifth place game
4	Ukraine	5	2	0	3	128	127	+1	4	Seventh place game
5	Netherlands (H)	5	1	0	4	107	121	−14	2	Ninth place game
6	Romania	5	0	0	5	120	143	−23	0	Eleventh place game

Source: EHF
Rules for classification: 1) points; 2) head-to-head points; 3) head-to-head goal difference; 4) head-to-head number of goals scored; 5) goal difference.
(H) Hosts
Notes:

11 December 1998; 16:00	**Hungary**	**28–24**	**Romania**	Amsterdam; Referees: Baum, Szczepański (POL)
11 December 1998; 16:00		(14–11)		Amsterdam; Referees: Baum, Szczepański (POL)
11 December 1998; 16:00		Report		Amsterdam; Referees: Baum, Szczepański (POL)

11 December 1998; 18:00	**Austria**	**24–25**	**Germany**	Amsterdam; Referees: Boye, Jensen (DEN)
11 December 1998; 18:00		(15–13)		Amsterdam; Referees: Boye, Jensen (DEN)
11 December 1998; 18:00		Report		Amsterdam; Referees: Boye, Jensen (DEN)

11 December 1998; 20:15	**Ukraine**	**23–16**	**Netherlands**	Amsterdam; Referees: Nachevski, Nachevski (MKD)
11 December 1998; 20:15		(11–9)		Amsterdam; Referees: Nachevski, Nachevski (MKD)
11 December 1998; 20:15		Report		Amsterdam; Referees: Nachevski, Nachevski (MKD)

13 December 1998; 15:00	**Netherlands**	**19–28**	**Hungary**	Amsterdam; Attendance: 1,500; Referees: Pendić, Majstorović (FRY)
13 December 1998; 15:00		(5–12)		Amsterdam; Attendance: 1,500; Referees: Pendić, Majstorović (FRY)
13 December 1998; 15:00		Report		Amsterdam; Attendance: 1,500; Referees: Pendić, Majstorović (FRY)

13 December 1998; 17:00	**Romania**	**24–26**	**Austria**	Amsterdam; Attendance: 1,300; Referees: Ivanchev, Georgiev (BUL)
13 December 1998; 17:00		(13–13)		Amsterdam; Attendance: 1,300; Referees: Ivanchev, Georgiev (BUL)
13 December 1998; 17:00		Report		Amsterdam; Attendance: 1,300; Referees: Ivanchev, Georgiev (BUL)

13 December 1998; 19:00	**Germany**	**28–27**	**Ukraine**	Amsterdam; Attendance: 800; Referees: Baum, Szczepański (POL)
13 December 1998; 19:00		(18–14)		Amsterdam; Attendance: 800; Referees: Baum, Szczepański (POL)
13 December 1998; 19:00		Report		Amsterdam; Attendance: 800; Referees: Baum, Szczepański (POL)

14 December 1998; 15:30	**Hungary**	**21–26**	**Austria**	Amsterdam; Attendance: 750; Referees: Nachevski, Nachevski (MKD)
14 December 1998; 15:30		(10–11)		Amsterdam; Attendance: 750; Referees: Nachevski, Nachevski (MKD)
14 December 1998; 15:30		Report		Amsterdam; Attendance: 750; Referees: Nachevski, Nachevski (MKD)

14 December 1998; 17:30	**Netherlands**	**18–19**	**Germany**	Amsterdam; Attendance: 1,000; Referees: Kohout, Dolejš (CZE)
14 December 1998; 17:30		(8–11)		Amsterdam; Attendance: 1,000; Referees: Kohout, Dolejš (CZE)
14 December 1998; 17:30		Report		Amsterdam; Attendance: 1,000; Referees: Kohout, Dolejš (CZE)

14 December 1998; 19:30	**Ukraine**	**32–24**	**Romania**	Amsterdam; Attendance: 900; Referees: Boye, Jensen (DEN)
14 December 1998; 19:30		(16–12)		Amsterdam; Attendance: 900; Referees: Boye, Jensen (DEN)
14 December 1998; 19:30		Report		Amsterdam; Attendance: 900; Referees: Boye, Jensen (DEN)

16 December 1998; 16:00	**Austria**	**30–24**	**Ukraine**	Amsterdam; Attendance: 450; Referees: Pendić, Majstorović (FRY)
16 December 1998; 16:00		(17–14)		Amsterdam; Attendance: 450; Referees: Pendić, Majstorović (FRY)
16 December 1998; 16:00		Report		Amsterdam; Attendance: 450; Referees: Pendić, Majstorović (FRY)

16 December 1998; 18:00	**Romania**	**23–30**	**Netherlands**	's-Hertogenbosch; Attendance: 2,000; Referees: Baum, Szczepański (POL)
16 December 1998; 18:00		(9–12)		's-Hertogenbosch; Attendance: 2,000; Referees: Baum, Szczepański (POL)
16 December 1998; 18:00		Report		's-Hertogenbosch; Attendance: 2,000; Referees: Baum, Szczepański (POL)

16 December 1998; 20:00	**Hungary**	**25–18**	**Germany**	Amsterdam; Attendance: 600; Referees: Hansson, Olsson (SWE)
16 December 1998; 20:00		(13–10)		Amsterdam; Attendance: 600; Referees: Hansson, Olsson (SWE)
16 December 1998; 20:00		Report		Amsterdam; Attendance: 600; Referees: Hansson, Olsson (SWE)

17 December 1998; 16:00	**Ukraine**	**22–29**	**Hungary**	Amsterdam; Attendance: 400; Referees: Kohout, Dolejš (CZE)
17 December 1998; 16:00		(11–17)		Amsterdam; Attendance: 400; Referees: Kohout, Dolejš (CZE)
17 December 1998; 16:00		Report		Amsterdam; Attendance: 400; Referees: Kohout, Dolejš (CZE)

17 December 1998; 18:00	**Germany**	**27–25**	**Romania**	Amsterdam; Attendance: 600; Referees: Nachevski, Nachevski (MKD)
17 December 1998; 18:00		(16–12)		Amsterdam; Attendance: 600; Referees: Nachevski, Nachevski (MKD)
17 December 1998; 18:00		Report		Amsterdam; Attendance: 600; Referees: Nachevski, Nachevski (MKD)

17 December 1998; 20:00	**Austria**	**28–24**	**Netherlands**	Amsterdam; Attendance: 1,000; Referees: Hansson, Olsson (SWE)
17 December 1998; 20:00		(13–9)		Amsterdam; Attendance: 1,000; Referees: Hansson, Olsson (SWE)
17 December 1998; 20:00		Report		Amsterdam; Attendance: 1,000; Referees: Hansson, Olsson (SWE)

=== Group B ===
Pos	Team	Pld	W	D	L	GF	GA	GD	Pts	Qualification
1	Norway	5	5	0	0	137	102	+35	10	Semifinals
2	Denmark	5	4	0	1	138	115	+23	8	Semifinals
3	Poland	5	3	0	2	112	110	+2	6	Fifth place game
4	Macedonia	5	2	0	3	111	136	−25	4	Seventh place game
5	Russia	5	0	1	4	112	128	−16	1 (Note: Spain 26–26 Russia)	Ninth place game
6	Spain	5	0	1	4	107	126	−19	1	Eleventh place game

Source: EHF
Rules for classification: 1) points; 2) head-to-head points; 3) head-to-head goal difference; 4) head-to-head number of goals scored; 5) goal difference.
Notes:

11 December 1998; 16:00	**Poland**	**20–15**	**Spain**	's-Hertogenbosch; Referees: Hansson, Olsson (SWE)
11 December 1998; 16:00		(9–8)		's-Hertogenbosch; Referees: Hansson, Olsson (SWE)
11 December 1998; 16:00		Report		's-Hertogenbosch; Referees: Hansson, Olsson (SWE)

11 December 1998; 18:00	**Denmark**	**37–21**	**Macedonia**	's-Hertogenbosch; Referees: Scholtens, Stolk (NED)
11 December 1998; 18:00		(19–10)		's-Hertogenbosch; Referees: Scholtens, Stolk (NED)
11 December 1998; 18:00		Report		's-Hertogenbosch; Referees: Scholtens, Stolk (NED)

11 December 1998; 20:00	**Norway**	**25–20**	**Russia**	's-Hertogenbosch; Referees: Klucsó, Lekrinszki (HUN)
11 December 1998; 20:00	Grini 7	(9–10)	Mozgovaia 4	's-Hertogenbosch; Referees: Klucsó, Lekrinszki (HUN)
11 December 1998; 20:00	3× (yellow card) 3× (suspension)	Report	2× (yellow card) 2× (suspension)	's-Hertogenbosch; Referees: Klucsó, Lekrinszki (HUN)

12 December 1998; 16:00	**Russia**	**21–25**	**Poland**	's-Hertogenbosch; Referees: Pendić, Majstorović (FRY)
12 December 1998; 16:00	Mozgovaia 7	(9–14)	Matuszewska 7	's-Hertogenbosch; Referees: Pendić, Majstorović (FRY)
12 December 1998; 16:00	3× (yellow card) 5× (suspension) 1× (red card)	Report	3× (yellow card) 3× (suspension)	's-Hertogenbosch; Referees: Pendić, Majstorović (FRY)

12 December 1998; 18:00	**Spain**	**23–26**	**Denmark**	's-Hertogenbosch; Referees: Klucsó, Lekrinszki (HUN)
12 December 1998; 18:00		(10–13)		's-Hertogenbosch; Referees: Klucsó, Lekrinszki (HUN)
12 December 1998; 18:00		Report		's-Hertogenbosch; Referees: Klucsó, Lekrinszki (HUN)

12 December 1998; 20:00	**Macedonia**	**23–27**	**Norway**	's-Hertogenbosch; Referees: Kohout, Dolejš (CZE)
12 December 1998; 20:00		(12–13)		's-Hertogenbosch; Referees: Kohout, Dolejš (CZE)
12 December 1998; 20:00		Report		's-Hertogenbosch; Referees: Kohout, Dolejš (CZE)

14 December 1998; 16:00	**Macedonia**	**27–22**	**Spain**	's-Hertogenbosch; Attendance: 600; Referees: Hansson, Olsson (SWE)
14 December 1998; 16:00		(13–10)		's-Hertogenbosch; Attendance: 600; Referees: Hansson, Olsson (SWE)
14 December 1998; 16:00		Report		's-Hertogenbosch; Attendance: 600; Referees: Hansson, Olsson (SWE)

14 December 1998; 18:00	**Norway**	**30–19**	**Poland**	's-Hertogenbosch; Attendance: 1,000; Referees: Pendić, Majstorović (FRY)
14 December 1998; 18:00		(14–8)		's-Hertogenbosch; Attendance: 1,000; Referees: Pendić, Majstorović (FRY)
14 December 1998; 18:00		Report		's-Hertogenbosch; Attendance: 1,000; Referees: Pendić, Majstorović (FRY)

14 December 1998; 20:00	**Denmark**	**27–22**	**Russia**	's-Hertogenbosch; Attendance: 1,100; Referees: Scholtens, Stolk (NED)
14 December 1998; 20:00	Fruelund, Kjærgaard 5	(14–10)	Shevchenko 6	's-Hertogenbosch; Attendance: 1,100; Referees: Scholtens, Stolk (NED)
14 December 1998; 20:00	2× (yellow card) 2× (suspension)	Report	2× (yellow card) 5× (suspension)	's-Hertogenbosch; Attendance: 1,100; Referees: Scholtens, Stolk (NED)

16 December 1998; 16:00	**Russia**	**23–25**	**Macedonia**	's-Hertogenbosch; Attendance: 310; Referees: Ivanchev, Georgiev (BUL)
16 December 1998; 16:00	Mozgovaia 12	(14–11)	Radulović 9	's-Hertogenbosch; Attendance: 310; Referees: Ivanchev, Georgiev (BUL)
16 December 1998; 16:00	2× (yellow card) 4× (suspension)	Report	3× (yellow card) 2× (suspension)	's-Hertogenbosch; Attendance: 310; Referees: Ivanchev, Georgiev (BUL)

16 December 1998; 18:00	**Norway**	**27–21**	**Spain**	Amsterdam; Attendance: 300; Referees: Scholtens, Stolk (NED)
16 December 1998; 18:00		(13–14)		Amsterdam; Attendance: 300; Referees: Scholtens, Stolk (NED)
16 December 1998; 18:00		Report		Amsterdam; Attendance: 300; Referees: Scholtens, Stolk (NED)

16 December 1998; 20:00	**Poland**	**21–29**	**Denmark**	's-Hertogenbosch; Attendance: 1,500; Referees: Kohout, Dolejš (CZE)
16 December 1998; 20:00		(9–15)		's-Hertogenbosch; Attendance: 1,500; Referees: Kohout, Dolejš (CZE)
16 December 1998; 20:00		Report		's-Hertogenbosch; Attendance: 1,500; Referees: Kohout, Dolejš (CZE)

17 December 1998; 16:00	**Spain**	**26–26**	**Russia**	's-Hertogenbosch; Referees: Baum, Szczepański (POL)
17 December 1998; 16:00	Puche 8	(12–12)	Chechkova, Verakso 5	's-Hertogenbosch; Referees: Baum, Szczepański (POL)
17 December 1998; 16:00	4× (yellow card) 3× (suspension)	Report	3× (yellow card) 5× (suspension) 1× (red card)	's-Hertogenbosch; Referees: Baum, Szczepański (POL)

17 December 1998; 18:00	**Poland**	**27–15**	**Macedonia**	's-Hertogenbosch; Attendance: 1,000; Referees: Boye, Jensen (DEN)
17 December 1998; 18:00		(13–8)		's-Hertogenbosch; Attendance: 1,000; Referees: Boye, Jensen (DEN)
17 December 1998; 18:00		Report		's-Hertogenbosch; Attendance: 1,000; Referees: Boye, Jensen (DEN)

17 December 1998; 20:00	**Denmark**	**19–28**	**Norway**	's-Hertogenbosch; Attendance: 2,200; Referees: Klucsó, Lekrinszki (HUN)
17 December 1998; 20:00		(8–12)		's-Hertogenbosch; Attendance: 2,200; Referees: Klucsó, Lekrinszki (HUN)
17 December 1998; 20:00		Report		's-Hertogenbosch; Attendance: 2,200; Referees: Klucsó, Lekrinszki (HUN)

== Final round ==
=== Bracket ===
Semifinals
19 December
**Norway**	**28**
Hungary	14
19 December
Austria	24
**Denmark**	**35**

Final
20 December
**Norway**	**24**
Denmark	16
Third place
20 December
**Hungary**	**30**
Austria	24

=== Eleventh place game ===
19 December 1998; 13:00	**Romania**	**28–25**	**Spain**	's-Hertogenbosch; Attendance: 200; Referees: Scholtens, Stolk (NED)
19 December 1998; 13:00	Amariei 13	(15–16)	Pareja 6	's-Hertogenbosch; Attendance: 200; Referees: Scholtens, Stolk (NED)
19 December 1998; 13:00	3× (yellow card) 3× (suspension)	Report	3× (yellow card) 5× (suspension)	's-Hertogenbosch; Attendance: 200; Referees: Scholtens, Stolk (NED)

=== Ninth place game ===
19 December 1998; 15:30	**Netherlands**	**19–32**	**Russia**	Amsterdam; Attendance: 2,250; Referees: Klucsó, Lekrinszki (HUN)
19 December 1998; 15:30	Van Linder 6	(8–14)	Chechkova, Mozgovaia 7	Amsterdam; Attendance: 2,250; Referees: Klucsó, Lekrinszki (HUN)
19 December 1998; 15:30	3× (yellow card) 5× (suspension)	Report	2× (yellow card) 10× (suspension) 2× (red card)	Amsterdam; Attendance: 2,250; Referees: Klucsó, Lekrinszki (HUN)

=== Seventh place game ===
19 December 1998; 17:30	**Ukraine**	**35–21**	**Macedonia**	's-Hertogenbosch; Attendance: 400; Referees: Hansson, Olsson (SWE)
19 December 1998; 17:30	Derepasko 9	(21–14)	Abramova 5	's-Hertogenbosch; Attendance: 400; Referees: Hansson, Olsson (SWE)
19 December 1998; 17:30	2× (yellow card) 2× (suspension)	Report	2× (yellow card) 6× (suspension)	's-Hertogenbosch; Attendance: 400; Referees: Hansson, Olsson (SWE)

=== Fifth place game ===
19 December 1998; 13:00	**Germany**	**23–26**	**Poland**	Amsterdam; Attendance: 900; Referees: Nachevski, Nachevski (MKD)
19 December 1998; 13:00	three players 5	(12–12)	Soja 10	Amsterdam; Attendance: 900; Referees: Nachevski, Nachevski (MKD)
19 December 1998; 13:00	3× (yellow card) 2× (suspension)	Report	3× (yellow card) 7× (suspension) 1× (red card)	Amsterdam; Attendance: 900; Referees: Nachevski, Nachevski (MKD)

=== Semifinals ===
19 December 1998; 18:00	**Norway**	**28–14**	**Hungary**	's-Hertogenbosch; Attendance: 1,500; Referees: Baum, Szczepański (POL)
19 December 1998; 18:00	Grini 9	(13–8)	three players 3	's-Hertogenbosch; Attendance: 1,500; Referees: Baum, Szczepański (POL)
19 December 1998; 18:00	3× (yellow card) 3× (suspension)	Report	2× (yellow card) 5× (suspension)	's-Hertogenbosch; Attendance: 1,500; Referees: Baum, Szczepański (POL)

19 December 1998; 18:00	**Austria**	**24–35**	**Denmark**	Amsterdam; Attendance: 2,700; Referees: Kohout, Dolejš (CZE)
19 December 1998; 18:00	Fridrikas 9	(9–22)	C. Andersen 11	Amsterdam; Attendance: 2,700; Referees: Kohout, Dolejš (CZE)
19 December 1998; 18:00	2× (yellow card) 2× (suspension)	Report	3× (yellow card) 3× (suspension)	Amsterdam; Attendance: 2,700; Referees: Kohout, Dolejš (CZE)

=== Third place game ===
20 December 1998; 16:30	**Hungary**	**30–24**	**Austria**	Amsterdam; Attendance: 3,300; Referees: Boye, Jensen (DEN)
20 December 1998; 16:30	Farkas 10	(18–11)	Fridrikas 11	Amsterdam; Attendance: 3,300; Referees: Boye, Jensen (DEN)
20 December 1998; 16:30	3× (yellow card) 2× (suspension)	Report	3× (yellow card) 3× (suspension)	Amsterdam; Attendance: 3,300; Referees: Boye, Jensen (DEN)

=== Final ===
20 December 1998; 19:00	**Norway**	**24–16**	**Denmark**	Amsterdam; Attendance: 3,300; Referees: Pendić, Majstorović (FRY)
20 December 1998; 19:00	Sørlie 7	(13–7)	three players 3	Amsterdam; Attendance: 3,300; Referees: Pendić, Majstorović (FRY)
20 December 1998; 19:00	3× (yellow card) 2× (suspension)	Report	2× (yellow card) 1× (suspension)	Amsterdam; Attendance: 3,300; Referees: Pendić, Majstorović (FRY)

== Ranking and statistics ==
=== Final ranking ===
1st place, gold medalist(s)	Norway
2nd place, silver medalist(s)	Denmark
3rd place, bronze medalist(s)	Hungary
4	Austria
5	Poland
6	Germany
7	Ukraine
8	Macedonia
9	Russia
10	Netherlands
11	Romania
12	Spain

Source: EuroHandball.com.

1998 Women's European champions

**Norway**
**1st title**

Ann Cathrin Eriksen, Camilla Carstens, Cecilie Leganger,
Elisabeth Hilmo, Elise Alsand, Else-Marthe Sørlie,
Heidi Tjugum, Janne Tuven, Jeanette Nilsen,
Kjersti Grini (captain), Mette Davidsen, Mia Hundvin,
Sahra Hausmann, Siv Heim Sæbøe, Tonje Larsen,
and Trine Haltvik, Head coach: Marit Breivik.
Source: Dagbladet.

=== All Star Team ===
Position	Player
Goalkeeper	Cecilie Leganger (NOR)
Right wing	Janne Kolling (DEN)
Right back	Kjersti Grini (NOR)
Centre back	Camilla Andersen (DEN)
Left back	Ausra Fridrikas (AUT)
Left wing	Sabina Soja (POL)
Pivot	Tonje Kjærgaard (DEN)
