= Ana Maria Tănasie =

Romanian handball player (born 1995)

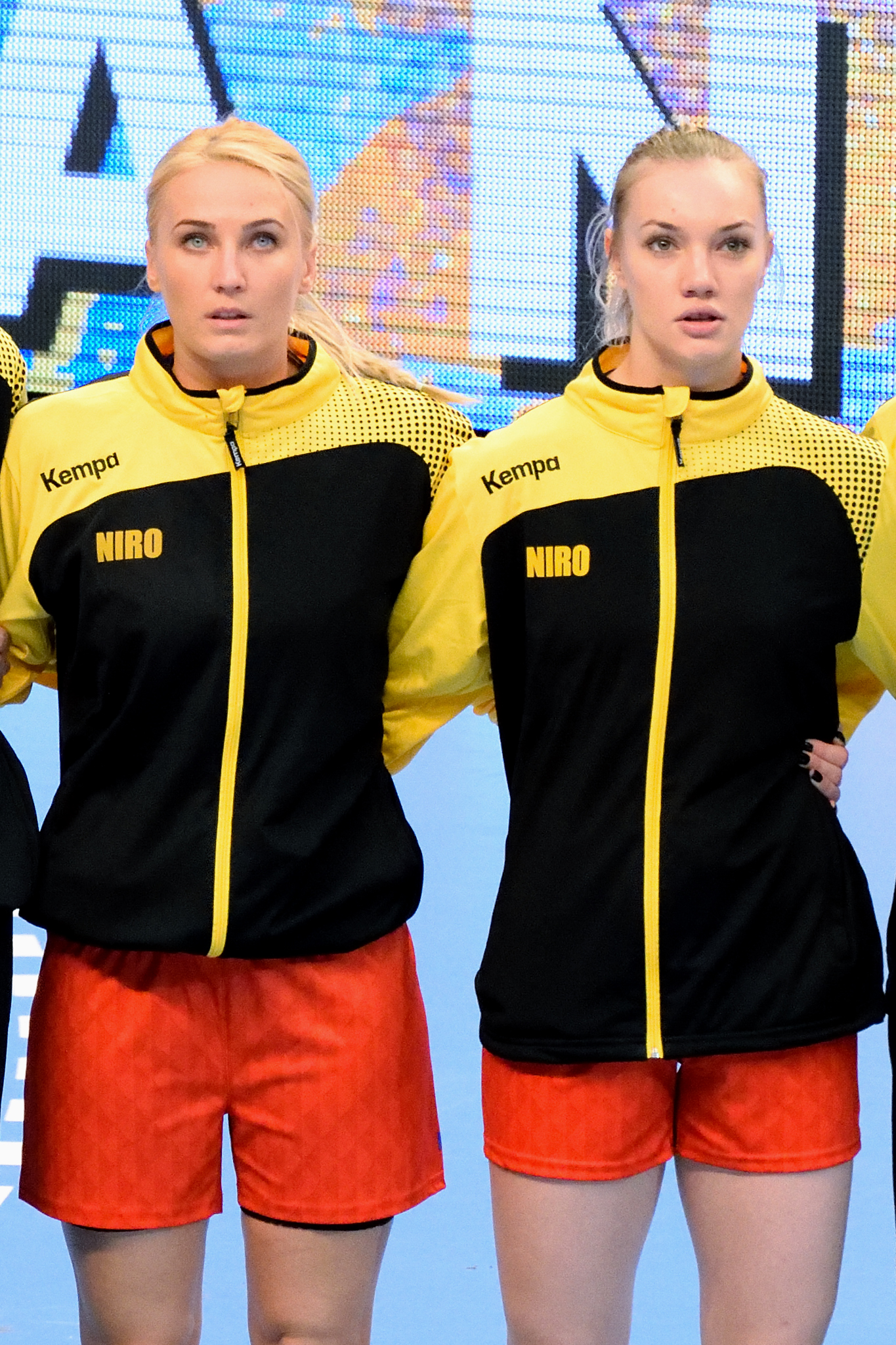
- Ana Maria Tănasie (right) with Laura Chiper

Personal information
- Nationality: Romanian
- Born: 6 April 1995 (age 31) Hunedoara, Romania
- Height: 1.72 m (5 ft 8 in)

Sport
- Sport: Handball
- Position: Left wing
- Current club: Minaur Baia Mare
- Number: 6

Senior clubs
- Years: Team
- 2011–2013: HC Zalău
- 2013–2016: HCM Baia Mare
- 2014–2015: → SCM Craiova (loan)
- 2016-2017: Dunărea Brăila
- 2017-2018: SCM Râmnicu Vâlcea
- 2018-2019: SCM Craiova
- 2019-2020: Măgura Cisnădie
- 2020-: Minaur Baia Mare
National team
- Years: Team
- 2015–: Romania
Medal record
World Championship
Bronze medal – third place	2015 Denmark

Ana Maria Tănasie (born 6 April 1995) is a Romanian handballer who plays for Minaur Baia Mare.

She was given the award of Cetățean de onoare ("Honorary Citizen") of her hometown Hunedoara in 2015.

== Achievements ==
- Liga Naţională:
  - Winner: 2014
  - Silver Medalist: 2016
- Cupa României:
  - Winner: 2013, 2014
- Supercupa României:
  - Winner: 2013, 2015
- World Championship:
  - Bronze Medalist: 2015

== Awards and recognition ==
- Handball-Planet.com Young World Left Wing of the Season: 2016
