= Kjersti Grini =

Norwegian handball player (born 1971)

Personal information
- Nationality: Norwegian
- Born: 9 September 1971 (age 55) Oslo, Norway
- Height: 178 cm (70 in)

Sport
- Sport: Handball
- Position: Left back

Senior clubs
- Years: Team
- –: Jaren
- –: Lunner IL
- –: Bækkelagets SK
- –: Toten
- –: Bækkelagets SK
- 1997-2000: Tertnes IL
- 2000-2003: Ikast-Bording EH
- 2012: Gjøvik HK
National team
Years	Team	Apps	(Gls)
1987–2001	Norway	201	(1003)
Medal record
Olympic Games
Bronze medal – third place	2000 Sydney
World Women's Handball Championship
Gold medal – first place	1999 Denmark/Norway
Silver medal – second place	2001 Italy
European Women's Handball Championship
Bronze medal – third place	1994 Germany
Silver medal – second place	1996 Denmark
Gold medal – first place	1998 Netherlands

Kjersti Grini (born 9 September 1971) is a Norwegian former handball player and poker player. She is the most scoring player on the Norwegian national team ever.

She was part of the squad that won the first Norwegian European Women's Handball Championship in 1998 as well as the first Norwegian team to win the 1999 World Women's Handball Championship in 1999.

== Career ==
She played for the clubs Jaren, Lunner, Bækkelaget, Toten and Ikast. With Ikast she won the Danish Cup in 2001 and the EHF Cup in 2002. She played 201 games for the Norwegian National team and scored 1003 goals, an all time record.

At the 1996 European Championship she was the tournament topscorer.

She has also worked as a handball expert for TV 2.

== Reality TV ==
In 2022 Grini was a participant of The Farm Celebrity, a reality show on TV 2, where she reached the final week.

In 2023, Grini was a contestant on another reality show; The Traitors on TV 2.

In 2024, she participated in the celebrity game show 99 to Beat Norway, where she finished 8th out of 56 contestants.

In 2025 she participated in The Croft Celebrity, a side show to The Farm Celebrity, where the winner got a spot on The Farm. After winning The Croft, she made it to the final week of The Farm and at the end was crowned the winner in the final against former team mate Susann Goksør Bjerkrheim.

== See also ==
- List of women's handballers with 1000 or more international goals
