= 1998–99 EHF Women's Cup Winners' Cup =

The 1998–99 EHF Women's Cup Winners' Cup was the 23rd edition of EHF's competition for women's handball national cup champions. It ran from October 3, 1998, to May 15, 1999.

Defending champion Bækkelagets SK won again the competition, beating Ferrobús Tortajada in the final. For the first time in the Cup Winners' Cup's history no team from the former Eastern Bloc or former Yugoslavia reached the final.

== Results ==
Preliminary round October 3–11, 1998
(Portugal) Colégio de Gaia | 15 | 15 | 30
(Russia) Kuban Krasnodar | 36 | 32 | 68
(Switzerland) LC Brühl | 41 | 32 | 73
(Luxembourg) HB Dudelange | 19 | 10 | 29
(Poland) Zagłębie Lubin | 21 | 18 | 39
(France) ASPTT Metz | 22 | 30 | 52
(Czech Republic) Slavia Prague | 22 | 23 | 45
(Turkey) Anadolu Üniversitesi | 15 | 27 | 42
(North Macedonia) HC Struzanka | 12 | 10 | 22
(Norway) Larvik HK | 38 | 37
(Hungary) Herz Ferencváros | 32 | 30 | 62
(Netherlands) SEW Zeeman | 12 | 17 | 29
(Israel) Maccabi Holon | 20 | 12 | 32
(Ukraine) Spartak Kyiv | 30 | 33 | 63
(Austria) SSV Dornbirn | 19 | 13 | 32
(Lithuania) Vikas Vilnius | 31 | 34 | 65
(Belarus) RSVSMRUOR Minsk | 24 | 23 | 47
(Romania) Silcotub Zalău | 33 | 32 | 65
(Bosnia and Herzegovina) HC Gorazde | 4 | 5 | 9
(Spain) Ferrobús Tortajada | 43 | 40 | 83
(Greece) OFN Ionias | 20 | 15 | 35
(Bulgaria) Aves Burgas | 18 | 23 | 41
(Denmark) Frederiksberg IF | 36 | 31 | 67
(Serbia and Montenegro) Duvanska Niš | 23 | 17 | 40
(Italy) DeGasperi Enna | 17 | 20 | 37
(Slovenia) Olimpija Ljubljana | 30 | 26 | 56

Round of 16; November 7–15, 1998
(Russia) Kuban Krasnodar | 28 | 34 | 62
(Switzerland) LC Brühl | 22 | 28 | 50
(Germany) TV Lützellinden | 29 | 17 | 46
(France) ASPTT Metz | 24 | 27 | 51
(Norway) Bækkelagets SK | 32 | 28 | 60
(Czech Republic) Slavia Prague | 21 | 23 | 44
(Norway) Larvik HK | 33 | 24 | 57
(Hungary) Herz Ferencváros | 23 | 33 | 56
(Ukraine) Spartak Kyiv | 30 | 27 | 57
(Lithuania) Vikas Vilnius | 21 | 26 | 47
(Romania) Silcotub Zalău | 15 | 22 | 37
(Spain) Ferrobús Tortajada | 27 | 25 | 52
(Croatia) Kras Zagreb | 42 | 39 | 81
(Bulgaria) Aves Burgas | 18 | 15 | 33
(Denmark) Frederiksberg IF | 32 | 20 | 52
(Slovenia) Olimpija Ljubljana | 21 | 30 | 51

Quarterfinals; February 27 – March 7, 1999
(Russia) Kuban Krasnodar | 23 | 19 | 42
(France) ASPTT Metz | 14 | 30 | 44
(Norway) Bækkelagets SK | 32 | 22 | 54
(Norway) Larvik HK | 19 | 23 | 42
(Ukraine) Spartak Kyiv | 13 | 21 | 34
(Spain) Ferrobús Tortajada | 24 | 17 | 41
(Croatia) Kras Zagreb | 24 | 23 | 47
(Denmark) Frederiksberg IF | 31 | 22 | 53

Semifinals; April 10–17, 1999
(France) ASPTT Metz | 17 | 22 | 39
(Norway) Bækkelagets SK | 17 | 28 | 45
(Spain) Ferrobús Tortajada | 25 | 21 | 46
(Denmark) Frederiksberg IF | 20 | 20 | 40

Final; May 8–15, 1999
(Norway) Bækkelagets SK | 26 | 24 | 50
(Spain) Ferrobús Tortajada | 13 | 22 | 35
