= Tanja Milanović =

Serbian handball player (born 1977)

Medal record

Women's handball

Representing Yugoslavia

World Championships
Bronze medal – third place	2001 Italy	Team competition

Tanja Milanović (born 15 June 1977) is a former handballer from Serbia, playing left back. She set her career in October 2010. Among the clubs she played for are ŽORK "Napredak" Kruševac, Madeira Andebol SAD, Randers HK, FC Midtjylland Håndbold, FCK Håndbold and FIF. She was the 2005/06 Danish league top scorer.
