= Georgiana Ciuciulete =

Romanian handball player (born 1987)

Personal information
- Full name: Georgiana-Andreia Ciuciulete
- Nationality: Romanian
- Born: 23 April 1987 (age 39) Băilești, Romania
- Height: 1.70 m (5 ft 7 in)

Sport
- Sport: Handball
- Position: Pivot
- Current club: Corona Brașov
- Number: 3

Senior clubs
- Years: Team
- –2006: Oltchim Râmnicu Vâlcea
- 2006–2015: HC Zalău
- 2015–: Corona Brașov
National team
Years	Team	Apps	(Gls)
–	Romania	24	(37)

Georgiana-Andreia Ciuciulete (/tʃuːtʃuː/; née Coadălată) is a Romanian handballer who plays as a line player for Corona Brașov.

== International honours ==
- EHF Cup:
  - Finalist: 2012
  - Semifinalist: 2013, 2016
