= 1994–95 Women's EHF Cup =

European handball tournament

The 1994–95 Women's EHF Cup was the 14th edition of the competition, running from 7 October 1994 to 7 May 1995. 1994 runner-up Debreceni VSC defeated Baekkelagets SK on away goals to become the first Hungarian club to win it. Buxtehuder SV and Slovan Duslo Sala also reached the semifinals.

== Qualifying round ==
Team #1	Agg.	Team #2	1st	2nd
Kizilay (Turkey)	62–40	(Italy) Sassari	43–22	19–18
Debreceni VSC (Hungary)	90–6	(Luxembourg) Echternach	48–2	42–4
Avtomobilist Brovary (Ukraine)	77–28	(Georgia (country)) Tbilisi	36–15	41–13
Zamet Rijeka (Croatia)	42–45	(Slovenia) Ajdovscina	28–23	14–22
Amadeo Tortajada (Spain)	65–28	(Switzerland) Uster	34–13	31–15
Sosnica Gliwice (Poland)	64–31	(Belgium) Meeuwen	33–14	31–17
Baku (Azerbaijan)	Walkover	(Iceland) Fram		
Gevgelija (North Macedonia)	49–31	Austria Tabak	30–13	19–18
Zora Olomouc (Czech Republic)	62–40	(Russia) Istochnik Rostov	20–24	21–25
Baekkelagets (Norway)	57–31	(Netherlands) Hellas Den Haag	27–11	30–20
Varpa Riga (Latvia)	Walkover	(Greece) Anagennisi Arta		

== Round of 16 ==
Team #1	Agg.	Team #2	1st	2nd
Kizilay (Turkey)	33–44	(Hungary) Debreceni VSC	18–22	15–22
Avtomobilist Brovary (Ukraine)	41–44	(Romania) Zalău	23–20	18–24
Ajdovscina (Slovenia)	43–59	(Spain) Amadeo Tortajada	23–28	20–31
Sosnica Gliwice (Poland)	45–65	(Germany) Buxtehuder	23–32	22–33
Fram (Iceland)	35–60	(Slovakia) Slovan Duslo Sala	14–33	21–27
Gevgelija (North Macedonia)	38–53	(France) Bouillarges	22–25	16–28
Istochnik Rostov (Russia)	33–34	(Norway) Baekkelagets	19–10	14–24
Anagennisi Arta (Greece)	33–61	(Denmark) GOG Gudme	20–30	13–31

== Quarter-finals ==
Team #1	Agg.	Team #2	1st	2nd
Debreceni VSC (Hungary)	38–33	(Romania) Zalău	24–14	14–19
Amadeo Tortajada (Spain)	45–54	(Germany) Buxtehuder	24–29	21–25
Slovan Duslo Sala (Slovakia)	57–33	(France) Bouillargues	31–14	26–19
Baekkelagets (Norway)	47–36	(Denmark) GOG Gudme	27–17	20–19

== Semifinals ==
Team #1	Agg.	Team #2	1st	2nd
Debreceni VSC (Hungary)	44–44	(Germany) Buxtehuder	21–21	23–23
Slovan Duslo Sala (Slovakia)	41–43	(Norway) Baekkelagets	23–21	18–22

== Final ==
Team #1	Agg.	Team #2	1st	2nd
Debreceni VSC (Hungary)	44–44	(Norway) Baekkelagets	22–14	22–30
