= HC Zalău =

- Full name: Handball Club Zalău
- Short name: Zalău
- Founded: 1978; 48 years ago
- Arena: Sala Sporturilor "Gheorghe Tadici", Zalău
- Capacity: 950
- President: (Romania) Radu Istrate
- Head coach: (Romania) Gheorghe Tadici
- League: Liga Naţională
- 2025–26: Liga Națională, 11th of 12
- Club colours
Home	Away

HC Zalău is a women's handball club from Zalău, Romania, that plays in the Romanian Women's Handball League.

On domestic level HC Zalau won three league titles (2001, 2004, 2005) and Romanian Cup once in 2003.

In Europe HC Zalau won the Women's Women's EHF Challenge Cup 1995–1996 season and in the same season by participating in the EHF Women's Champions Trophy won 3rd place. In the 2011–2012 season in the EHF Cup HC Zalau played second final in history, lost against the Russian team Lada Togliatti.

== History ==
In 1978 Gheorghe Tadici - John Bal Crișan - Simon Talos trio, with Tadici in the main role, set foot in the city of Meseş a women's handball team called Didactica Zalău.

In 1979 Didactica Zalău get to promote Division B, moving, for the first time in official competition at the senior level. In 1980, Didactica Zalău turns to Textila Zalau, textile enterprise is willing to invest in handball team. Four years later, in 1984 Textila managed to promote the first scene of Romanian handball. Two years later the team would relegate in Division B in the 1985–1986 season and a year later to promote back to the first division after a perfect season. Since then handball team HC Zalău evolving Romanian Handball League.

After two bronze medals in the seasons 1989 - 1990 and 1990 - 1991, Textila Zalău turns to Silcotex in 1992. Under this name, he became vice season 1993 - 1994 and in the same year (1994) changed their name for the third time, becoming Silcotub Zalău.

Again finishing 2nd in Romanian Handball League in the season 1995 - 1996, Silcotub Zalău have win at the end of the same season and EHF Challenge Cup or City Cup. Also in 1996 he finished third in the EHF Champions Trophy. For 14 consecutive years from 1994 to 2007 HC Zalău participated in European Cups, EHF Champions League, EHF Champions Trophy, EHF Cup Winners' Cup, EHF Cup and EHF Challenge Cup.

After the third title in history (2005) team changes its name to HC Zalău, earning the title of national runner at the end of the 2005–2006 season. At the end of the same season, Gheorghe Tadici had to leave for the Chimistul Râmnicu Vâlcea champion. Separation of Zalău handball would be almost fatal to the season 2007 - 2008, when HC Zalău, under the command of John Gherhardt, came to tour the dam to maintain in the National League.

Back to HC Zalău, after two years of absence, Gheorghe Tadici again resumed reconstruction of the team, saying it could even be the last in his career coach.

Location of HC Zalău

== Kits ==
HOME
2018-19	2019-20	2020–

AWAY
2017–18	2019–20	2020-

== Arena ==
- Name: Sala Sporturilor „Gheorghe Tadici”
- City: Zalău, România
- Address: Mihai Viteazul nr. 77, Zalău

== Team ==
=== Current squad ===
Squad for the 2025-26 season

Goalkeepers

- (Romania) Sara Rus
- (Romania) Andreea Nastasă
- (Romania) Ioana Nita

Wingers

- (Romania) Alexia Nita
- (Romania) Alexandra Orşivschi
- (Romania) Francesca Bălan

Line players

- (Tunisia) Mouna Jlezi
- (Romania) Adelina Iordache

Back players

- (Romania) Ioana Bălăceanu
- (Romania) Bianca Vintila
- (Romania) Andreea Mărginean
- (Tunisia) Aya Ben Abdallah
- (Romania) Lorena Verdeş
- (Romania) Mioara Ciubotaru
- (North Macedonia) Sara Stefanovska

=== Transfers ===
Transfers for 2025-2026

Joining

- (Romania) Francesca Bălan (LW)

Leaving

- (Serbia) Emilija Lazić (LB)
- (Ukraine) Andriyana Naumenko (PV)
- (Romania) Roberta Stamin (LW)

== Staff members ==
- (Romania) Chairman: Radu Istrate
- (Romania) Head Coach: Gheorghe Tadici
- (Romania) Assistant Coach: Elena Tadici
- (Romania) Masseur: Ileana Romocean
- (Romania) Masseur: Daniela Morari

== Honours ==
=== Europe ===
- EHF Champions League:
  - Group stage: 3rd place: 2001-02
  - Qualification Round 2: 2004–05, 2005,06
- EHF Champions Trophy:
  - Bronze (1): 1996
- EHF Cup Winners' Cup:
  - Semi-finals: 1994, 1998, 2001
  - Quarter-finals: 2003
  - Eighth-finals: 1999
  - Round 4: 2004
- EHF Cup:
  - Silver (1): 2012
  - Semi-finals: 1992, 2013
  - Quarter-finals: 1991, 1995, 2000, 2005, 2018
  - Round 3: 2006, 2007, 2011
- EHF Challenge Cup:
  - Gold (1): 1996
  - Semi-finals: 1997

=== Internal ===
- Liga Naţională:
  - Gold (3): 2001, 2004, 2005
  - Silver (8): 1994, 1996, 1997, 1998, 1999, 2000, 2002, 2006
  - Bronze (5): 1990, 1991, 1995, 2012, 2017
- Cupa României:
  - Gold (1): 2003
  - Silver (5): 1993, 1996, 1997, 1998, 2002
  - Semi-finals: 1994, 1995, 1999, 2004, 2006
- Supercupa României
  - Silver (1): 2011

== In European competitions ==
EHF competitions
Season	Competition	Pld	W	D	L	GF	GA	Diff	Final result
1978–79 – 1993–94	—	—	—	—	—	—	—	—	Did not participate
1994–95	EHF Cup	4	2	0	2	77	79	-2	Quarter-finals
1995–96	City Cup	10	6	0	4	221	198	+23	Winners
1995–96	Champions Trophy	2	1	0	1	45	45	0	Third place
1996–97	City Cup	6	5	0	1	138	120	+18	Semi-finals
1997–98	—	—	—	—	—	—	—	—	Did not participate
1998–99	Cup Winners' Cup	4	2	0	2	102	99	+3	Last 16
1999–2000	EHF Cup	6	4	1	1	185	139	+46	Quarter-finals
2000–01	Cup Winners' Cup	8	6	0	2	213	163	+50	Semi-finals
2001–02	EHF Champions League	10	4	3	3	284	262	+22	Group stage
2002–03	Cup Winners' Cup	6	5	0	1	165	117	+48	Quarter-finals
2003–04	Cup Winners' Cup	4	3	0	1	111	103	+8	Round 4
2004–05	EHF Champions League	4	2	0	2	111	99	+12	Qualification Round 2
2004–05	EHF Cup	6	4	0	2	187	167	+20	Quarter-finals
2005–06	EHF Champions League	4	3	0	1	109	96	+13	Qualification Round 2
2005–06	EHF Cup	2	1	0	1	58	59	-1	Round 3
2006–07	EHF Cup	4	2	0	2	96	114	-18	Round 3
2007–08 – 2009–10	—	—	—	—	—	—	—	—	Did not participate
2010–11	EHF Cup	4	3	0	1	136	82	+54	Round 3
2011–12	EHF Cup	10	6	1	3	272	236	+36	Finalist
2012–13	EHF Cup	8	5	0	3	205	169	+36	Semi-finals
2013–14	EHF Cup	2	1	0	1	53	54	-1	Round 3
2014–15 – 2016–17	—	—	—	—	—	—	—	—	Did not participate
2017–18	EHF Cup	12	9	0	3	319	299	+20	Quarter-finals
2018–19	EHF Cup	2	0	1	1	45	49	-4	Qualification Round 2
2019–20 – 2026–27	—	—	—	—	—	—	—	—	Did not participate
Total		118	74	6	38	3132	2749	+383	

Pld – Played; W – Won; D – Drawn; L – Lost; GF – Goals for; GA – Goals against; Diff – Difference.

=== European record ===
Season	Competition	Round	Club	Home	Away	Aggregate
1994–95	EHF Cup	1/8-finals	(Ukraine) Automobilist Brovary	24–18	20–23	44–41
1994–95	EHF Cup	1/4-finals	(Hungary) Debreceni VSC	19–14	14–24	33–38
1995–96	City Cup; Winner	1/16-finals	(Ukraine) Galitchanka Lvov	24–14	20–23	44–37
1995–96	City Cup; Winner	1/8-finals	(Poland) EB Start Elbląg	23–13	16–25	39–38
1995–96	City Cup; Winner	1/4-finals	(Hungary) Győri Keks ETO	29–17	18–21	47–38
1995–96	City Cup; Winner	Semi-finals	(Russia) Kuban Krasnodar	25–20	24–23	49–43
1995–96	City Cup; Winner	Final	(Norway) Gjerpen IF Skien	23–15	19–27	42–42 (a)
1995–96	Champions Trophy; Third place	Semi-final	(Croatia) Podravka Dolcela	22–31		
1995–96	Champions Trophy; Third place	3rd	(Hungary) Debreceni VSC	23–14		
1996–97	City Cup	1/8-finals	(Croatia) Tegra Čakovec	20–12	25–21	45–33
1996–97	City Cup	1/4-finals	(France) Stade Béthunois	26–19	20–18	46–37
1996–97	City Cup	Semi-finals	(Denmark) Ikast F.S.	24–21	23–29	47–50
1998–99	Cup Winners' Cup	1/16-finals	(Belarus) R.Sh.V.S.M.-R.U.O.R. Minsk	32–23	33–24	65–47
1998–99	Cup Winners' Cup	1/8-finals	(Spain) Ferrobus Mislata Tortajada	15–27	22–25	37–52
1999–2000	EHF Cup	1/16-finals	(Iceland) Íþróttafélagið Stjarnan	38–19	46–19	84–38
1999–2000	EHF Cup	1/8-finals	(Poland) Sośnica Gliwice	25–23	26–26	51–49
1999–2000	EHF Cup	1/4-finals	(Norway) Tertnes IL	31–26	19–26	50–52
2000–01	Cup Winners' Cup	Round 3	(Portugal) Club Sports da Madeira	37–16	33–17	70–33
2000–01	Cup Winners' Cup	Round 4	(Spain) Rocasa Gran Canaria	25–17	19–23	44–40
2000–01	Cup Winners' Cup	1/4-finals	(Russia) Kuban Krasnodar	29–21	24–21	53–42
2000–01	Cup Winners' Cup	Semi-finals	(Ukraine) Motor Zaporozhye	29–20	17–28	46–48
2001–02	Champions League	Round 1	(Netherlands) Zeeman Vastgoed SEW	39–25	30–31	69–56
2001–02	Champions League	Round 2	(Austria) McDonald's Wiener Neustadt	34–21	30–25	64–46
2001–02	Champions League	Group Matches (Group A)	(Norway) Larvik HK	29–29	27–31	3rd
2001–02	Champions League	Group Matches (Group A)	(Ukraine) Motor Zaporozhye	26–24	18–25	3rd
2001–02	Champions League	Group Matches (Group A)	(France) ES Besançon Féminin	26–26	25–25	3rd
2002–03	Cup Winners' Cup	Round 3	(Portugal) Juventude Desportiva do Lis	27–15	31–14	58–29
2002–03	Cup Winners' Cup	Round 4	(Turkey) Anadolu University S.C.	27–15	30–22	57–37
2002–03	Cup Winners' Cup	1/4-finals	(Hungary) Győri Graboplast ETO	24–22	26–29	50–51
2003–04	Cup Winners' Cup	Round 3	(Germany) Frankfurter HC	31–21	34–31	65–52
2003–04	Cup Winners' Cup	Round 4	(Spain) Ferrobus Mislata	27–18	19–33	46–51
2004–05	Champions League	Qualification Round 1	(Lithuania) Eglė Vilnius	34–21	31–22	65–43
2004–05	Champions League	Qualification Round 2	(Spain) CBM Astroc Sagunto	21–28	25–28	46–56
2004–05	EHF Cup	Round 3	(Portugal) CS Madeira	38–24	41–23	79–47
2004–05	EHF Cup	1/8-finals	(France) Le Havre AC	28–23	27–32	55–55
2004–05	EHF Cup	1/4-finals	(Hungary) Győri ETO	31–30	22–35	53–65
2005–06	Champions League	Qualification Round 1	(Croatia) Tegra Čakovec	20–12	25–21	45–33
2005–06	Champions League	Qualification Round 2	(Spain) CBM Astroc Sagunto	21–28	25–28	46–56
2005–06	EHF Cup	Round 3	(Turkey) Ankara Havelsan	30–29	28–30	58–59
2006–07	EHF Cup	Round 2	(Czech Republic) DHC Slavia Praha	30–22	24–20	54–42
2006–07	EHF Cup	Round 3	(Hungary) DVSC Debrecen	21–31	21–41	42–72
2010–11	EHF Cup	Round 2	(Luxembourg) HB Dudelange	43–16	42–11	85–27
2010–11	EHF Cup	Round 3	(Serbia) RK Zaječar	29–25	22–30	51–55
2011–12	EHF Cup; Finalist	Round 3	(Israel) Bnei Hertzeliya	30–21	33–21	63–42
2011–12	EHF Cup; Finalist	Last 16	(Romania) CSM București	28–20	27–24	55–44
2011–12	EHF Cup; Finalist	Quarter Final	(France) HBC Nîmes	29–29	27–24	56–53
2011–12	EHF Cup; Finalist	Semi Final	(Spain) C.B. Mar Alicante	24–26	30–20	54–46
2011–12	EHF Cup; Finalist	Final	(Russia) Lada	20–21	24–30	44–51
2012–13	EHF Cup	Round 3	(Iceland) Valur	22–21	23–24	45–45
2012–13	EHF Cup	Last 16	(Portugal) Juventude Desportiva do Lis	25–14	29–8	54–22
2012–13	EHF Cup	Quarter Final	(Spain) Grupo ASFI Itxako Navarra	39–20	31–22	70–42
2012–13	EHF Cup	Semi Final	(France) Metz Handball	21–26	15–34	36–60
2013–14	EHF Cup	Round 3	(Czech Republic) DHK Baník Most	28–21	25–33	53–54
2017–18	EHF Cup	Qualification Round 2	(Turkey) Ankara Yenimahalle BSK	26–21	34–29	60–50
2017–18	EHF Cup	Qualification Round 3	(Austria) Hypo Niederösterreich	29–21	30–22	59–43
2017–18	EHF Cup	Group Phase (Group D)	(Norway) Larvik HK (Sweden) H 65 Höörs HK (Czech Republic) DHK Baník Most	25–22; 24–21; 31–28	23–28; 19–30; 25–22	3rd
2017–18	EHF Cup	Quarter Final	(Turkey) Kastamonu Belediyesi GSK	29–28	24–27	53–55
2018–19	EHF Cup	Qualification Round 2	(Germany) Borussia Dortmund	25–25	20–24	45–49

Green – Win; Yellow – Draw; Red – Lost.

== Domestic competitions ==
League										Romanian Cup	Romanian Supercup	European competitions
Season	Division	Pos	Pld	W	D	L	GF	GA	Diff	Romanian Cup	Romanian Supercup	European competitions
1978–1979	—	—	—	—	—	—	—	—	—			
1979–1980	—	—	—	—	—	—	—	—	—			
1980–1981	—	—	—	—	—	—	—	—	—			
1981–1982	—	—	—	—	—	—	—	—	—			
1982–1983	—	—	—	—	—	—	—	—	—			
1983–1984	—	—	—	—	—	—	—	—	—			
1984–1985	—	—	—	—	—	—	—	—	—			
1985–1986	—	—	—	—	—	—	—	—	—			
1986–1987	—	—	—	—	—	—	—	—	—			
1987–1988	—	—	—	—	—	—	—	—	—			
1988–1989	—	—	—	—	—	—	—	—	—			
1989–1990	Liga Națională	Third place	—	—	—	—	—	—	—			
1990–1991	Liga Națională	Third place	—	—	—	—	—	—	—			
1991–1992	Liga Națională	—	—	—	—	—	—	—	—			
1992–1993	Liga Națională	—	—	—	—	—	—	—	—	Finalist		
1993–1994	Liga Națională	Second place	—	—	—	—	—	—	—	Semi-finals		
1994–1995	Liga Națională	Third place	—	—	—	—	—	—	—	Semi-finals		EHF Cup quarter-finals
1995–1996	Liga Națională	Second place	—	—	—	—	—	—	—	Finalist		City Cup winner; Champions Trophy third place
1996–1997	Liga Națională	Second place	—	—	—	—	—	—	—	Finalist		City Cup semi-finals
1997–1998	Liga Națională	Second place	—	—	—	—	—	—	—	Finalist		
1998–1999	Liga Națională	Second place	—	—	—	—	—	—	—	Semi-finals		Cup Winners' Cup last 16
1999–2000	Liga Națională	Second place	—	—	—	—	—	—	—			EHF Cup quarter-finals
2000–2001	Liga Națională	First place	—	—	—	—	—	—	—			Cup Winners' Cup semi-finals
2001–2002	Liga Națională	Second place	—	—	—	—	—	—	—	Finalist		EHF Champions League group stage
2002–2003	Liga Națională	—	—	—	—	—	—	—	—	Winner		Cup Winners' Cup quarter-finals
2003–2004	Liga Națională	First place	—	—	—	—	—	—	—	Semi-finals		Cup Winners' Cup round 4
2004–2005	Liga Națională	First place	—	—	—	—	—	—	—			EHF Champions League qualification round 2; EHF Cup quarter-finals
2005–2006	Liga Națională	Second place	—	—	—	—	—	—	—	Semi-finals		EHF Champions League qualification round 2; EHF Cup round 3
2006–2007	Liga Națională	—	—	—	—	—	—	—	—			EHF Cup round 3
2007–2008	Liga Națională	—	—	—	—	—	—	—	—			
2008–2009	Liga Națională	—	—	—	—	—	—	—	—			
2009–2010	Liga Națională	—	—	—	—	—	—	—	—			
2010–2011	Liga Națională	—	—	—	—	—	—	—	—		Finalist	EHF Cup round 3
2011–2012	Liga Națională	Third place	—	—	—	—	—	—	—			EHF Cup finalist
2012–2013	Liga Națională	—	—	—	—	—	—	—	—			EHF Cup semi-finals
2013–2014	Liga Națională	—	—	—	—	—	—	—	—			EHF Cup round 3
2014–2015	Liga Națională	—	—	—	—	—	—	—	—			
2015–2016	Liga Națională	—	—	—	—	—	—	—	—			
2016–2017	Liga Națională	Third place	—	—	—	—	—	—	—			
2017–2018	Liga Națională	—	—	—	—	—	—	—	—			EHF Cup quarter-finals
2018–2019	Liga Națională	7th	24	10	3	11	647	650	-3			EHF Cup qualification round 2
2019–2020	Liga Națională	—	—	—	—	—	—	—	—			
2020–2021	Liga Națională	—	—	—	—	—	—	—	—			
2021–2022	Liga Națională	—	—	—	—	—	—	—	—			
2022–2023	Liga Națională	—	—	—	—	—	—	—	—			
2023–2024	Liga Națională	—	—	—	—	—	—	—	—			
2024–2025	Liga Națională	9th	—	—	—	—	—	—	—	Quarter-finals		
2025–2026	Liga Națională	11th	22	2	3	17	526	649	-123	Round of 16		
2026–2027	Liga Națională	—	—	—	—	—	—	—	—			
Total		3 titles								1 title	0 titles	City Cup winner; EHF Cup finalist

Pos – Position; Pld – Played; W – Won; D – Drawn; L – Lost; GF – Goals for; GA – Goals against; Diff – Difference.
Only confirmed domestic honours and publicly available season statistics are listed. Complete season-by-season league statistics for older seasons are not available from a single public official source.

== Coaches ==
Period	Coaches
1978 — 2006	(Romania) Gheorghe Tadici
2006 — 2008	To be confirmed
2008 — present	(Romania) Gheorghe Tadici

== Selected former players ==
- (Romania) Claudia Constantinescu
- (Romania) Teodora Bloj
- (Romania) Crina Pintea
- (Romania) Georgiana Ciuciulete
- (Romania) Ana Maria Șomoi
- (Romania) Valeria Motogna
- (Romania) Gabriella Szűcs
- (Romania) Alina Czeczi
- (Romania) Mirela Nichita
- (Romania) Daniela Băbeanu
- (Romania) Adriana Holhoș-Stoian
- (Romania) Daniela Crap
- (Romania) Diana Moroti
- (Romania) Talida Tolnai
- (Romania) Carmen Mican
- (Romania) Daniela Morari
- (Romania) Tereza Ludmila Pîslaru
- (Romania) Raluca Iuliana Agrigoroaie
- (Romania) Ramona Farcău
- (Romania) Roxana Han (Gatzel)
- (Romania) Alina Țurcaș-Jula
- (Romania) Mihaela Pârâianu
- (Romania) Mihaela Crăcană
- (Romania) Carmen Buceschi
- (Romania) Sanda Criste
- (Romania) Alina Șorodoc (Măierean)
- (Romania) Simona Spiridon
- (Romania) Steluța Luca
- (Romania) Marinela Pătru
- (Romania) Artemizia-Aurica Sagmar
- (Romania) Olimpia Vereș
- (Romania) Lăcrămioara Fiastru
- (Romania) Lucia Butnărașu
- (Romania) Ana Șuhai
- (Romania) Maria Elena Rădoi
- (Romania) Claudia Constantinescu
- (Romania) Roxana Szölösi

== Coaches ==
Period	Coach
1978 - 2006	(Romania) Gheorghe Tadici
2006 - 2007	(Romania) Ioan Gerhardt
2007 - 2011	(Romania) Sorin Rădulescu
2008 -	(Romania) Gheorghe Tadici

=== Statistic top players ===
==== Notable European players ====
No.	Name	Position	Notes
1	(Romania) Valeria Motogna	Left back	Former HC Zalău player; Romanian international
2	(Romania) Simona Gogîrlă	Back	Former HC Zalău player; Romanian international
3	(Romania) Alina Dobrin	Centre back	Former HC Zalău player; Romanian international
4	(Romania) Carmen Amariei	Back	Former HC Zalău player; Romanian international
5	(Romania) Ramona Farcău	Right wing	Former HC Zalău player; Romanian international
6	(Romania) Crina Pintea	Pivot	Former HC Zalău player; Romanian international
7	(Romania) Gabriella Szűcs	Back	Former HC Zalău player; Romanian international
8	(Romania) Raluca Kelemen	Goalkeeper	Former HC Zalău player; Romanian international
9	(Romania) Talida Tolnai	Goalkeeper	Former HC Zalău player; Romanian international
10	(Romania) Ana Maria Tănasie	Left wing	Former HC Zalău player; Romanian international

==== Domestic competitions notable players ====
No.	Name	Period	Notes
1	(Romania) Valeria Motogna	To be confirmed	Won domestic honours with HC Zalău
2	(Romania) Simona Gogîrlă	To be confirmed	Former HC Zalău player
3	(Romania) Alina Dobrin	To be confirmed	Former HC Zalău player
4	(Romania) Carmen Amariei	To be confirmed	Former HC Zalău player
5	(Romania) Ramona Farcău	To be confirmed	Former HC Zalău player
6	(Romania) Crina Pintea	To be confirmed	Former HC Zalău player
7	(Romania) Gabriella Szűcs	To be confirmed	Former HC Zalău player
8	(Romania) Raluca Kelemen	To be confirmed	Former HC Zalău player
9	(Romania) Talida Tolnai	To be confirmed	Former HC Zalău player
10	(Romania) Ana Maria Tănasie	To be confirmed	Former HC Zalău player

==== Individual awards in European competitions ====
Season	Player / Team	Award
1995–96	(Romania) HC Zalău	City Cup winner
1995–96	(Romania) HC Zalău	Champions Trophy – third place
2011–12	(Romania) HC Zalău	EHF Cup finalist

Last updated on 2 July 2026
