= Gheorghe Tadici =

Romanian handball coach (born 1952)

Gheorghe Tadici (born 27 March 1952 in Piatra Neamț) is a Romanian handball coach in charge of the Romanian top division side HC Zalău. In 2012 he also became head coach of the Romanian women's national handball team.

== Coaching ==
After graduating from the Sports College in Cluj-Napoca, in 1974, Tadici trained the Romanian team HC Zalău for 30 years, winning the Romanian Women's Handball League three times and one time the EHF Challenge Cup in 1996. Then, he won the silver medal in the 2005 World Women's Handball Championship from Russia and got the 4th placed in the 2007 World Women's Handball Championship from France, with the Romania women's national handball team.

In 2006, he became the coach of CS Oltchim Râmnicu Vâlcea, winning with this team five trophies: the Romanian Women's Handball League title, the Romanian Cup, the Romanian Supercup, the Women's EHF Cup Winners' Cup and the EHF Women's Champions Trophy all in 2007. He qualified then Oltchim for the first time in the history in the main groups of the EHF Women's Champions League.

Gheorghe Tadici was fired in the summer of 2008 from Oltchim, after a conflict with the board. He returned then as general manager of HC Zalău. He also returned as head coach of the Romanian women's national handball team in the autumn of 2012.
