= 2011–12 Women's EHF Cup =

European handball tournament

Women's EHF Cup
- 2011–12

Tournament information
- Sport: Handball
- Dates: 2 September 2011–12 May 2012

Final positions
- Champions: (Russia) Lada Togliatti
- Runner-up: (Romania) HC Zalău

Tournament statistics
- Top scorer(s): (Russia) Ekaterina Davydenko (60 goals)

The 2011–12 EHF Cup was the 31st edition of the competition. Lada Togliatti defeated HC Zalău in the final to win its second international title after the 2002 Cup Winners' Cup.

== Qualifying rounds ==
=== Round 2 ===
Team #1	Agg.	Team #2	1st match	2nd match
Dudelange (Luxembourg)	73–30	(Cyprus) Aradhippou	36–10	37–20
Arkatron Minsk (Belarus)	62–47	(Kosovo) Prishtina	33–24	29–23
Kärnten Twisters (Austria)	62–40	(Montenegro) Biseri	31–21	31–19
Maccabi Arazim Ramat Gan (Israel)	43–58	(Israel) Bnei Hertzeliya	21–25	22–33

=== Round 3 ===
Team #1	Agg.	Team #2	1st match	2nd match
Esbjerg (Denmark)	67–29	(Greece) Anagennisi Arta	31–15	36–14
Tvis Holstebro (Denmark)	97–47	(Ukraine) HC Karpaty Uzhhorod	57–24	40–23
Lugi (Sweden)	47–54	(Russia) Lada Togliatti	24–25	23–29
Antwerpen (Belgium)	29–81	(Spain) Bera Bera	14–44	37–15
João do Barros (Portugal)	33–68	(Denmark) Vejen	16–38	17–30
Strovolos (Cyprus)	40–85	(Germany) Frankfurter	19–46	21–39
VOC Amsterdam (Netherlands)	50–50	(Germany) Bayer Leverkusen	26–25	24–25
Astrakhanochka (Russia)	76–30	(Luxembourg) Dudelange	40–18	36–12
Arkatron Minsk (Belarus)	39–60	(Spain) Mar Alicante	22–31	17–29
Vardar Skopje (North Macedonia)	40–79	(Hungary) Békéscsabai ENKSE	20–39	20–40
Maliye (Turkey)	84–52	(Serbia) HC Naisa Niš	44–26	40–26
BNTU Minsk (Belarus)	55–59	(Hungary) Váci NKSE	32–35	23–24
Zofingen (Switzerland)	39–88	(France) Mios Biganos	16–42	26–43
Cercle Nimes (France)	63–56	(Austria) Kärnten Twisters	34–30	29–26
Lublin (Poland)	57–60	(Romania) CSM București	32–30	25–30
Bnei Herzliya (Israel)	42–63	(Romania) Zalău	21–33	21–30

== Last 16 ==
Team #1	Agg.	Team #2	1st match	2nd match
Esbjerg (Denmark)	52–54	(Denmark) Tvis Holstebro	28–27	24–27
Lada Togliatti (Russia)	62–57	(Spain) Bera Bera	28–22	34–35
Vejen (Denmark)	51–50	(Germany) Frankfurter	30–30	21–20
Bayer Leverkusen (Germany)	51–44	(Russia) Astrakhanochka	29–22	22–22
Mar Alicante (Spain)	47–44	(Hungary) Békéscsabai ENKSE	22–25	25–19
Maliye (Turkey)	55–52	(Hungary) Váci NKSE	35–28	20–24
Mios Biganos (France)	51–55	(France) Cercle Nimes	27–27	24–28
CSM București (Romania)	44–55	(Romania) Zalău	24–27	20–28

== Quarter-finals ==
Team #1	Agg.	Team #2	1st match	2nd match
Tvis Holstebro (Denmark)	72–72	(Russia) Lada Togliatti	42–34	30–38
Vejen (Denmark)	60–57	(Germany) Bayer Leverkusen	35–25	25–32
Mar Alicante (Spain)	52–46	(Turkey) Maliye	26–26	26–20
Cercle Nimes (France)	53–56	(Romania) Zalău	24–27	29–29

== Semifinals ==
Team #1	Agg.	Team #2	1st match	2nd match
Lada Togliatti (Russia)	43–37	(Denmark) Vejen	21–16	22–21
Mar Alicante (Spain)	46–54	(Romania) Zalău	20–30	26–24

== Final ==
Team #1	Agg.	Team #2	1st match	2nd match
Lada Togliatti (Russia)	51–44	(Romania) Zalău	30–24	21–20

== Top goalscorers ==
As of 12 May 2012

Rank	Player	Club	Goals
1	(Russia) Ekaterina Davydenko	(Russia) Lada Togliatti	60
2	(Romania) Georgiana Ciuciulete	(Romania) Zalău	56
3	(Croatia) Maida Arslanagić	(Denmark) KIF Vejen	53
