= Sośnica Gliwice =

Polish handball club

- Full name: SPR Sośnica Gliwice
- Founded: 1945; 81 years ago
- Arena: Hala Widowiskowo-sportowa im. jerzego wojewódzkieg
- Club colours

Sośnica Gliwice is a Polish women's handball team, based in Gliwice. It was founded in 1945.

They won the Polish Championship three times, in 1965, 1866 and 1972.

== See also ==
- Handball in Poland
- Sports in Poland
