= Nordstrand IF =

Norwegian sports club

- Nordstrand IF club logo
- Full name: Nordstrand idrettsforening
- Sport: association football, team handball, Nordic skiing, orienteering, track and field athletics
- Founded: 1919
- Based in: Nordstrand, Norway

Nordstrand IF Fotball
Home colours

Nordstrand Idrettsforening is a sports club in Nordstrand, Oslo, Norway. The club has sections for alpine skiing, association football and handball. It formerly had sections for orienteering, track and field and Nordic skiing. The club colors are white and blue.

== General history ==
It was founded in 1919 as a merge between Skiklubben Freidig (founded 1891) and Sportsklubben Grane (founded 1893). The club counts 1891 as its founding year.

In 2009 it incorporated neighboring club Ljan IF.

== Handball ==
In handball the club has won the National championships several times, both the men's and women's team. Notable players are Heidi Sundal, Susann Goksør Bjerkrheim, Else-Marthe Sørlie Lybekk, Alma Hasanić Grizović, Amanda Kurtovic and Vilde Ingstad. The women's team was one of the first of its kind in Norway, and won the first two editions of the Norwegian Women's Handball Cup in 1938 and 1939.

The women's team currently plays in the First Division (second tier), and the men's team plays in Postenligaen (first tier) as the cooperation team BSK/NIF which is fielded together with neighbors Bækkelagets SK.

== Football ==
Grane was a founding member of the Football Association of Norway, and also became the first Norwegian Football Cup champion in 1902.

The men's football team plays in the Third Division, the fourth tier of Norwegian football.

== Skiing ==
Freidig and Grane were both skiing clubs. Freidig had the ski jumping hill Lerskallen, which was later taken over by Grane and then Nordstrand. The clubs had several able skiers. The highest ranked competitor at the Holmenkollen ski festival was Herman Huitfeldt, who placed seventh in the Nordic combined in 1895. Walter Aigeltinger finished third in the B class in 1902, and also played on Grane's football team. Th. B. Dürendahl and Wilhelm Wettergren competed successfully in Central Europe in the early 1900s.

The club's best known member is alpine skier Kjetil André Aamodt.

== Athletics and orienteering ==
Athletics was added to the club's roster in 1921. Rolf Johannson became Norwegian champion in the 1500 metres in 1930, and also took a silver medal in 1929 and bronze medal in 1933. In 1929 he also took a bronze medal in the 800 metres. In the throwing events, Halfdan Johnsen took silver medals in shot put with both hands in 1925 and 1926, whereas Joel Arnesen won a bronze medal in the triple jump in 1929.

In orienteering the club won the relay at the National Championship for men in 1947, and for women in 1974.
