= EHF Women's Champions Trophy =

International handball competition

The EHF Women's Champions Trophy was an official competition for women's handball clubs of Europe.

== History ==
It was organized annually by the European Handball Federation (EHF) from 1994 to 2008. Until 2007 it was known as the Women's European Club Championship or the Super Cup. In 2008 was the last edition.

The Champions Trophy was played as a four-team tournament between the winners of the Champions League, EHF Cup and Cup Winners' Cup plus an additional invited club.

== Winners ==
Year	Final			Third place match
Year	Champion	Score	Second place	Third place	Score	Fourth place
1994; Details	(Austria); Hypo Niederösterreich	25–23	(Germany); TuS Walle Bremen	(Denmark); Viborg HK	26–24	(Germany); Buxtehuder SV
1995; Details	(Russia); Rotor Volgograd	27–21	(Hungary); DVSC-Aquaticum	(Austria); Hypo Niederösterreich	29–25	(Hungary); Dunaferr NK
1996; Details	(Croatia); Podravka Dolcela	22–21	(Germany); TV Giessen-Lützellinden	(Romania); Silcotub Zalău	23–14	(Hungary); Debreceni VSC
1997; Details	(Spain); Mar Valencia	27–25	(Russia); Istochnik Rostov	(Slovenia); Robit Olimpija Ljubljana	33–32	(Germany); Frankfurter HC
1998; Details	(Denmark); Ikast F.S.	25–24	(Norway); Baekkelagets Oslo	(Hungary); Dunaferr SE	28–23	(Austria); Hypo Niederösterreich
1999; Details	(Hungary); Dunaferr SE	28–27	(Norway); Baekkelagets Oslo	(Slovenia); Krim Electa NR Ljubljana	34–27	(Denmark); Viborg HK
2000; Details	(Austria); Hypo Niederösterreich	27–24	(Russia); Volgograd AKVA	(Spain); Ferrobus KU Mislata	32–23	(Romania); CS Rapid CFR București
2001; Details	(Denmark); Viborg HK A/S	23–22	(Ukraine); Motor Zaporizhzhia	(Slovenia); RK Krim Neutro Roberts	34–21	(Norway); Nordstrand 2000, Oslo
2002; Details	(North Macedonia); Kometal Gjorce Petrov Skopje	30–28	(Denmark); Ikast-Bording EH	(Hungary); HERZ – FTC Budapest	27–23	(Russia); HC Lada Toljatti
2003; Details	(Slovenia); Krim Ljubljana	33–28	(Denmark); Slagelse FH	(Denmark); Ikast-Bording EH	23–22	(France); ESBF Besançon
2004; Details	(Slovenia); Krim Ljubljana	34–25	(Austria); Hypo Niederösterreich	(Germany); HC Leipzig	27–26	(North Macedonia); Kometal Gjorce Petrov Skopje
2005	Not held			Not held
2006; Details	(Denmark); Viborg HK	31–26	(Slovenia); RK Krim Mercator Ljubljana	(Montenegro); ZRK Buducnost MONET	30–25	(Hungary); FTC Budapest
2007; Details	(Romania); CS Oltchim Râmnicu Vâlcea	23–19	(Russia); Zvezda Zvenigorod	(Denmark); Slagelse DT	35–34	(Russia); HC Lada Togliatti
2008; Details	(Russia); Zvezda Zvenigorod	28–27	(Austria); Hypo Niederösterreich	(Norway); Larvik HK	28–24	(Russia); HC Dinamo Volgograd

== Statistics ==
=== By country ===
Country	1st	2nd	3rd	4th	Total
Denmark	3	2	2	1	8
Russia	2	3	0	3	8
Austria	2	2	1	1	6
Slovenia	2	1	3	0	6
Hungary	1	1	2	3	7
Romania	1	0	1	1	3
Spain	1	0	1	0	2
(North Macedonia) Macedonia	1	0	0	1	2
Croatia	1	0	0	0	1
Norway	0	2	1	1	4
Germany	0	2	1	1	4
Ukraine	0	1	0	0	1
Montenegro	0	0	1	0	1
France	0	0	0	1	1
