= ŽORK Napredak Kruševac =

Serbian woman's handball club

- Full name: Ženski Omladinski Rukometni Klub Napredak
- Short name: ŽORK Napredak
- Founded: September 1, 1952; 74 years ago
- Arena: Kruševac Sports Hall
- Capacity: 3,000
- President: Igor Šljivić
- Head coach: Zoran Arsić
- League: Serbian first league

ŽORK Napredak (Serbian Cyrillic: ЖОРК Напредак, Женски омладински рукометни клуб Напредак) is a women's handball club from Kruševac, Serbia.

== History ==
ŽORK Napredak was founded on 1 September 1952, with its first game played on 14 October 1952 to commemorate the liberation from the Axis city of Kruševac. Between 1952 and 1971, the club participated in student competition.

In 1971, ŽORK Napredak entered the Handball Association of Yugoslavia's official competition. Over the next two decades, the club continued to perform and gain renown in the Socialist Federal Republic of Yugoslavia. The most important trophy ŽORK Napredak won in this period was the trophy SFR Yugoslavia in 1989.

In the early nineties, ŽORK Napredak grew into a leading Yugoslav and European club, and reached its peak in the last years of the twentieth century. The club won most of its competition trophies between 1995 and 2000, including both the EHF Challenge Cup and the Yugoslav Cup in 1999.

== Honours ==
=== European ===
- EHF Challenge Cup:
  - Winners (1): 1999
- Cup Winners' Cup:
  - 1/4 finals (2): 1998, 2001

=== National ===
- National cup:
  - Winners (1) 1999
- National league:
  - Vice-champions (5) 1997-2001

== Notable former players ==
- Ljiljana Knežević
- Tanja Milanović
- Zlata Paplacko
- Danijela Erčević
- Ana Batinić
- Ana Đokić
- Ana Vojčić
- Andrijana Budimir
- Slađana Dronić
