= Bækkelagets SK =

Norwegian sports club

Bækkelagets Sportsklub is a Norwegian sports club from Bekkelaget in southern Oslo, founded in 1909. The club has sections for skiing (including ski jumping and biathlon), orienteering, handball, football, floorball and track and field athletics, previously also bandy. It is known for organizing one of the world's largest youth football tournaments, Norway Cup.

== Handball ==
The club consists of 850 active handball players. The women's handball team won the Women's EHF Cup Winner's Cup in 1997/1998, and again in 1998/1999. The club also reached the final in EHF Women's Champions Trophy the same two seasons. In 1998 Bækkelaget had the best women's team in Europe. The club still plays in the Norwegian top league, but ambitions are far lower than in their best period.

Among the former players on the female team are: Susann Goksør Bjerkrheim, Kjersti Grini, Heidi Tjugum, Hege Kristine Kvitsand, Camilla Andersen, Anja Andersen, Sahra Hausmann, Siv Heim Sæbøe, Cecilie Leganger, Hong Jeong-ho, Gitte Madsen, Ausra Fridrikas, Ingrid Steen and Mette Ruud-Johansen.

=== Bækkelaget HE ===
Bækkelaget HE
- Full name: Bækkelaget Håndball Elite
- Short name: Bækkelaget
- Founded: 2013; 13 years ago
- Arena: Nordstrand Arena, Oslo
- Capacity: 2,000
- Head coach: Jørgen Laug
- League: Eliteserien
- 2020–21: 4th
- Club colours

Bækkelaget Håndball Elite is the elite handball department of Bækkelaget SK. The men's team plays in the top division of Norwegian handball, the Eliteserien, and the women's team plays in the Norwegian 2nd division (third tier). The men's team was known until 2013 as BSK/NIF, a cooperation team between Bækkelaget SK and Nordstrand IF. The construction of a new arena, BSK Arena, will begin in 2022.

==== Current squad ====
Squad for the 2023–24 season

Goalkeeper

- 96 (Norway) Sebastian Reiersen

RW

- 17 (Norway) Mads Presterud Ødegård
- 93 (Norway) Ulrik Berge Eriksson
- (Norway) Dag Hafsengen Olsen

LW

- 77 (Norway) Leander Myklebust Seime

Line players

- 21 (Denmark) Christoffer Langerhuus
- 31 (Norway) Henrik Rifseim-Sjøstrøm

Back players

- 2 (Norway) Sondre Mikal Solheim
- 4 (Norway) Samson Bjørke Kallestad
- 13 (Norway) Emil Havsgård
- 22 (Norway) Peter Dahl Christensen
- (Norway) Jonatan Goksør Bjerkrheim
- (Norway) Julius Goksør Bjerkrheim

=== Transfers ===
Transfers for the 2026–27 season

Joining

Leaving

- (Norway) Sondre Orheim (GK) to (Norway) Kolstad Håndball

=== Transfer History ===
Transfers for the 2025–26 season

Joining

Leaving

- (Norway) Axel Skaarnæs (LP) to (Germany) TV Großwallstadt

==== Notable former club players ====
- (Norway) Christian O'Sullivan
- (Norway) Johannes Hippe
- (Norway) Kevin Gulliksen
- (Norway) Kristian Sæverås
- (Norway) Magnus Abelvik Rød

==== Achievements ====
- Norwegian League
  - Silver: 2016/17
  - Bronze: 2013/14
- Norwegian League Playoffs
  - Finalist: 2013/14
- Norwegian Cup:
  - Winner: 1971 (outdoors)
  - Finalist: 1973 (outdoors), 2013
- Norwegian U20 Cup:
  - Winner: 1970, 2011, 2012, 2014, 2016
  - Finalist: 1965, 1969, 1972, 1974, 1975, 1976, 2018

==== European Record ====
Season	Competition	Round	Club	1st leg	2nd leg	Aggregate
2017-18	Challenge Cup	QR 1	(Iceland) Afturelding	25-26	29-27	55-52
2017-18	Challenge Cup	QR 2	(Romania) HC Dobrogea Sud Constanța	24-22	24-27	46–51
2021-22	European Cup	Round 1	(Ukraine) Motor-Politekhnika	23-41	32-20	73-43
2021-22	European Cup	Round 2	(Austria) Fivers	34-38	32-32	70-66
2021-22	European Cup	Round 3	(Luxembourg) Handball Esch	30-30	25-26	55-56

== Orienteering ==
Bækkelaget won the Jukola relay in 1988, 1999 and 2002. Notable orienteers who have competed for the club are Holger Hott, Bjørnar Valstad, Hanne Staff, Anne Margrethe Hausken, all world champions, and Anders Nordberg. Betty Ann Bjerkreim Nilsen competes in both orienteering and skiing.

== Football ==
Bækkelagets SK
Home colours

The men's team currently plays in the Fourth Division (fifth tier). It last played in the Third Division in 2004. Notable former players are Finn Seemann (funny, he broke his leg, and got 0.1 matches.) and Øyvind Bolthof (youth level only). The women's team currently plays in the Second Division. Their home field is Sportsplassen.
