= 1996 European Women's Handball Championship squads =

This article lists the squads and players who competed in the 1996 European Women's Handball Championship played in Denmark.

== Austria ==
1. Sylvia Kundt
2. Beate Hofmann
3. Laura Fritz
4. Ruth Swoboda
5. Annamaria Ur
6. Tatyana Dzhandzhagava
7. Sylvia Strass
8. Rima Sypkuviene
9. Stephanie Ofenböck
10. Edith Török
11. Sorina Lefter
12. Ausra Ziukiene
13. Edith Mika
14. Stanca Bozovic
15. Iris Morhammer
16. Barbara Strass

== Croatia ==
1. Ljerka Krajnovic
2. Irina Maljko
3. Klaudija Klikovac-Bubalo
4. Marija Celina
5. Helena Lulic
6. Renata Damjanic
7. Vlatka Mihoci
8. Danijela Tuda
9. Andrea Hrg
10. Natasa Kolega
11. Koraljka Milic
12. Elena Nemaskalo
13. Snjezana Petika
14. Bozica Greguric

== Denmark ==
Squad
Player	Birth date	Caps	Goals	Club	1st selection
Lene Rantala (GK)	August 1968	104	0	(Norway) IK Junkeren	14.02.1991
Gitte Sunesen (GK)	December 1971	71	1	(Denmark) GOG	30.06.1991
Susanne Munk Lauritsen (GK)	October 1967	140	3	(Denmark) Viborg HK	18.11.1987
Anne Dorthe Tanderup	April 1972	71	126	(Denmark) Viborg HK	13.02.1991
Camilla Andersen	July 1973	103	369	(Norway) Bækkelagets SK	12.02.1992
Tina Bøttzau	August 1971	83	163	(Denmark) GOG	24.05.1990
Anette Hoffmann	May 1971	132	447	(Denmark) Viborg HK	16.06.1990
Anja Byrial Hansen	November 1973	82	119	(Denmark) GOG	13.02.1992
Marianne Florman	June 1964	96	147	(Japan) Chateraise	13.02.1990
Janne Kolling	July 1968	189	550	(Denmark) Viborg HK	22.08.1988
Anja Andersen	February 1969	107	557	(Norway) Bækkelagets SK	25.10.1989
Gitte Madsen	March 1969	89	211	(Denmark) DHG	25.05.1991
Heidi Astrup	May 1972	93	248	(Denmark) Viborg HK	07.11.1990
Tonje Kjærgaard	June 1975	58	111	(Denmark) Ikast FS Elitehåndbold	08.02.1994
Kristine Andersen	April 1976	7	15	(Germany) TSV Bayer Leverkusen	20.02.1996
Mette Vestergaard	November 1975	10	19	(Denmark) Frederiksberg IF	23.02.1995

== Germany ==
1. Michaela Schanze
2. Christine Lindemann
3. Miroslava Ritskiavitchius
4. Emilia Luca
5. Grit Jurack
6. Manuela Fiedel
7. Annika Schafferus
8. Andrea Bölk
9. Michaela Erler
10. Kathrin Blacha
11. Franziska Heinz
12. Eva Kiss-Györi
13. Melanie Schliecker

== Hungary ==
1. Beáta Hoffmann
2. Andrea Farkas
3. Anikó Meksz
4. Klára Kertész
5. Gabriella Takács
6. Rita Borók
7. Eszter Mátéfi
8. Éva Szarka
9. Andrea Nagy
10. Erzsébet Kocsis
11. Beatrix Tóth
12. Beáta Siti
13. Éva Erdős
14. Anasztázia Virincsik
15. Anita Kulcsár
16. Beatrix Balogh

== Lithuania ==
1. Aurika Celesiene
2. Jurata Jankaitiene
3. Margarita Daublyte
4. Ingrida Ramonaite
5. Jurga Banislauskaite
6. Elena Berciuniene
7. Reda Urbonaviciene
8. Ruta Biziene
9. Gitane Miseikiene
10. Ingrida Radzeviciute
11. Ausra Seselskyte
12. Lina Spalviene
13. Larisa Pavoliene

== Norway ==
1. Heidi Marie Tjugum
2. Annette Skotvoll
3. Jeanette Nilsen
4. Tonje Larsen
5. Kjersti Grini
6. Kristine Duvholt Havnas
7. Susann Goksör Bjerkrheim
8. Kari Solem Aune
9. Sahra Hausmann
10. Mette Davidsen
11. Trine Haltvik
12. Kristine Moldestad
13. Monica Vik Hansen
14. Janne Tuven
15. Ellen Mitchell
16. Silje Bolset

== Poland ==
1. Iwona Pabich
2. Magdalena Chemicz
3. Agnieszka Zienkiewicz
4. Iwona Budzynska
5. Izabela Kowalewska
6. Agnieszka Truszynska
7. Iwona Nabozna
8. Anna Garwacka
9. Malgorzata Jedrzejczak
10. Izabela Czapko
11. Renata Zukiel
12. Sabina Soja
13. Anna Ejsmont
14. Aleksandra Pawelska
15. Ewa Szelag

== Romania ==
1. Carmen Moldovan-Petca
2. Olimpia Veres
3. Ildiko Kerekes
4. Valentina Cozma
5. Petronela Melinte
6. Lidia Draganescu
7. Lacramioara Pintelei
8. Corina Schiopu
9. Mariana Tirca
10. Marinela Patru
11. Mihaela Apostol
12. Alina-Ileana Jula
13. Mihaela Bobocea
14. Roxana Gheorghiu
15. Luminita Stroe

== Russia ==
1. Stella Vartanian
2. Natalia Gontcharova
3. Nigina Saidova
4. Natalya Deriouguina
5. Marina Chernovalenko
6. Natalia Boudarina
7. Olga Evtcherenko
8. Irina Kalinichenko
9. Raissa Verakso
10. Svetlana Mozgovaya
11. Irina Poletaeva
12. Nadezhda Konnova
13. Natalia Malakhova
14. Inna Volkova

== Sweden ==
1. Kristina Ström
2. Kristina Jönsson
3. Theresa Claesson
4. Sara Tilly
5. Ulrika Karlsson
6. Gunilla Olsson
7. Helen Benjaminsson
8. Karin Nilsson
9. Veronica Isaksson
10. Lina Olsson
11. Cecilia Aagren
12. Madelene Olsson
13. Kristina Olson
14. Asa Elisabeth Eriksson

== Ukraine ==
1. Larysa Zaspa
2. Svitlana Morozova
3. Ganna Kryvoruchko
4. Larissa Kouzmenko
5. Nataliya Derepasko
6. Irina Magripova
7. Olena Yatsenko
8. Tetiana Brabinko-Salogub
9. Nataliya Martynienko
10. Tetyana Novikova
11. Inna Dolgun
12. Liliya Stolpakova
13. Maryna Vergelyuk
14. Natalia Datsenko
