= 1998 European Women's Handball Championship squads =

This article lists the squads and players who competed in the 1998 European Women's Handball Championship played in Netherlands.

== Austria ==
1. Ausra Fridrikas
2. Barbara Strass
3. Doris Meltzer
4. Edith Mika
5. Iris Morhammer
6. Laura Fritz
7. Natalia Rusnatschenko
8. Renata Cieloch
9. Rima Sypkuviene
10. Stanka Bozovic
11. Stephanie Ofenböck
12. Tanja Dshandshagava
13. Tanja Logvin

== Denmark ==
1. Anette Hoffmann Moberg
2. Camilla Andersen
3. Christina Roslyng Hansen
4. Gitte Sunesen
5. Helle Simonsen
6. Janne Johannesen Kolling
7. Karen Brødsgaard
8. Karina Jespersen
9. Katrine Fruelund
10. Kristine Andersen
11. Lene Rantala
12. Lotte Kiærskou
13. Mette Vestergaard Larsen
14. Susanne Munk Lauritsen
15. Tonje Kjærgaard

== Germany ==
1. Agnieszka Tobiasz
2. Anke Schulz
3. Birte Tesch
4. Christine Lindemann
5. Emilia Luca
6. Franziska Heinz
7. Heike Schmidt
8. Kathrin Blacha
9. Melanie Schliecker
10. Michaela Erler
11. Michaela Schanze
12. Nikola Pietzsch
13. Romy Reincke
14. Silke Christiansen
15. Silvia Schmidt
16. Yvonne Karrasch

== Hungary ==
1. Ágnes Farkas
2. Andrea Farkas
3. Anikó Kántor
4. Anikó Nagy
5. Anita Kulcsár
6. Beáta Siti
7. Beatrix Balogh
8. Beatrix Kökény
9. Gabriella Takács
10. Helga Németh
11. Ildikó Pádár
12. Judit Zsemberyné Simics
13. Katalin Pálinger
14. Krisztina Pigniczki
15. Rita Deli

== Macedonia ==
1. Anzela Platon
2. Biljana Naumoska
3. Biljana Risteska
4. Gordana Naceva
5. Julijana Crvenkovska
6. Klara Boeva
7. Larisa Kiseleva
8. Marina Abramova
9. Mirjana Cupic
10. Oksana Maslova
11. Olgica Todorovska
12. Valentina Radulovic

== Netherlands ==
1. Adriana Krijnen
2. Diane Lamein
3. Diane Ordelmans
4. Elly an de Boer
5. Heidi Veltmaat
6. Laura Robben
7. Marieke van Linder
8. Marlie Menten
9. Natasa Burgers
10. Nicole Heuwkemeijer
11. Olga Assink
12. Renate Erkelens
13. Wilhelmina Feijen

== Norway ==
1. Ann Cathrin Eriksen
2. Camilla Carstens
3. Cecilie Leganger
4. Elisabeth Hilmo
5. Elise Alsand
6. Else-Marte Sörlie
7. Heidi Tjugum
8. Janne Tuven
9. Jeanette Nielsen
10. Kjersti Grini
11. Mette Davidsen
12. Mia Hundvin
13. Sara Hausmann
14. Siv Heim Saeboe
15. Tonje Larsen
16. Trine Haltvik

== Romania ==
1. Alina Dobrin
2. Anamaria Stetz
3. Carmen Amariei
4. Cristina Dogaru
5. Cristina Mihai
6. Luminita Hutupan
7. Maria Iorgu
8. Maria Radoi Constantinescu
9. Marinela Patru
10. Mihaela Bobocea
11. Narcisa Paunica
12. Ramona Mihalache
13. Simona Gogirla
14. Simona Stanciu
15. Steluta Luca
16. Victorina Bora

== Poland ==
1. Agnieszka Matuszewska
2. Agnieszka Truszyńska
3. Anna Ejsmont
4. Dagmara Kot
5. Ewa Jarzyna
6. Iwona Blaszkowska
7. Iwona Łącz
8. Iwona Nabożna
9. Iwona Pabich
10. Justyna Sebrala
11. Małgorzata Jędrzejczak
12. Monika Studzińska
13. Renata Żukiel
14. Sabina Soja

== Russia ==
1. Ekaterina Koulaguina
2. Elena Chatalova
3. Elena Tchaoussova
4. Inna Suslina
5. Irina Kalinitchenko
6. Lyudmyla Shevchenko
7. Maria Sidorova
8. Natalia Deriouguina
9. Natalia Gontcharova
10. Nigina Saidova
11. Olga Tchetchkova
12. Raissa Verakso
13. Svetlana Mozgovaya
14. Svetlana Smirnova

== Spain ==
1. Aitziber Elejaga Vargas
2. Amaia Ugartemendia
3. Ana Isabel Ruiz Perez
4. Begona Sanchez Santos
5. Consuelo Benvent Aparici
6. Cristina Gomez Arquer
7. Cristina Lopez Quiros
8. Eider Rubio Ponce
9. Elena Ciubotaru Turcu
10. Elisabeth Lopez Valledor
11. Gemma Lujan Suarz
12. Lidia Sanchez Alias
13. Montserrat Puche Díaz
14. Natalia Morskova
15. Susana Pareja Ibarra
16. Teresa Andreu Rodriguez

== Ukraine ==
1. Halyna Markushevska
2. Laryssa Kovaleva
3. Laryssa Kharlaniuk
4. Maryna Verhelyuk
5. Maya Karbunar
6. Nataliya Datchenko
7. Nataliya Derepasko
8. Nataliya Mytryuk
9. Nataliya Sen
10. Olena Tsyhytsia
11. Olena Yatsenko
12. Oxana Sakada
13. Tetjana Novikova
14. Tetyana Vorozhtsova
15. Valentyna Ivanko
16. Viktoriya Khachatryan
