= Austria at the 2000 Summer Olympics =

- IOC code: AUT
- NOC: Austrian Olympic Committee
- Website: www.olympia.at (in German)

in Sydney
- Competitors: 92 (55 men and 37 women) in 17 sports
- Flag bearer: Wolfram Waibel
- Medals Ranked 32nd: Gold 2 Silver 1 Bronze 0 Total 3

Summer Olympics appearances (overview)
- 1896; 1900; 1904; 1908; 1912; 1920; 1924; 1928; 1932; 1936; 1948; 1952; 1956; 1960; 1964; 1968; 1972; 1976; 1980; 1984; 1988; 1992; 1996; 2000; 2004; 2008; 2012; 2016; 2020; 2024

Other related appearances
- 1906 Intercalated Games

Austria competed at the 2000 Summer Olympics in Sydney, Australia. 92 competitors, 55 men and 37 women, took part in 68 events in 17 sports.

== Medalists ==
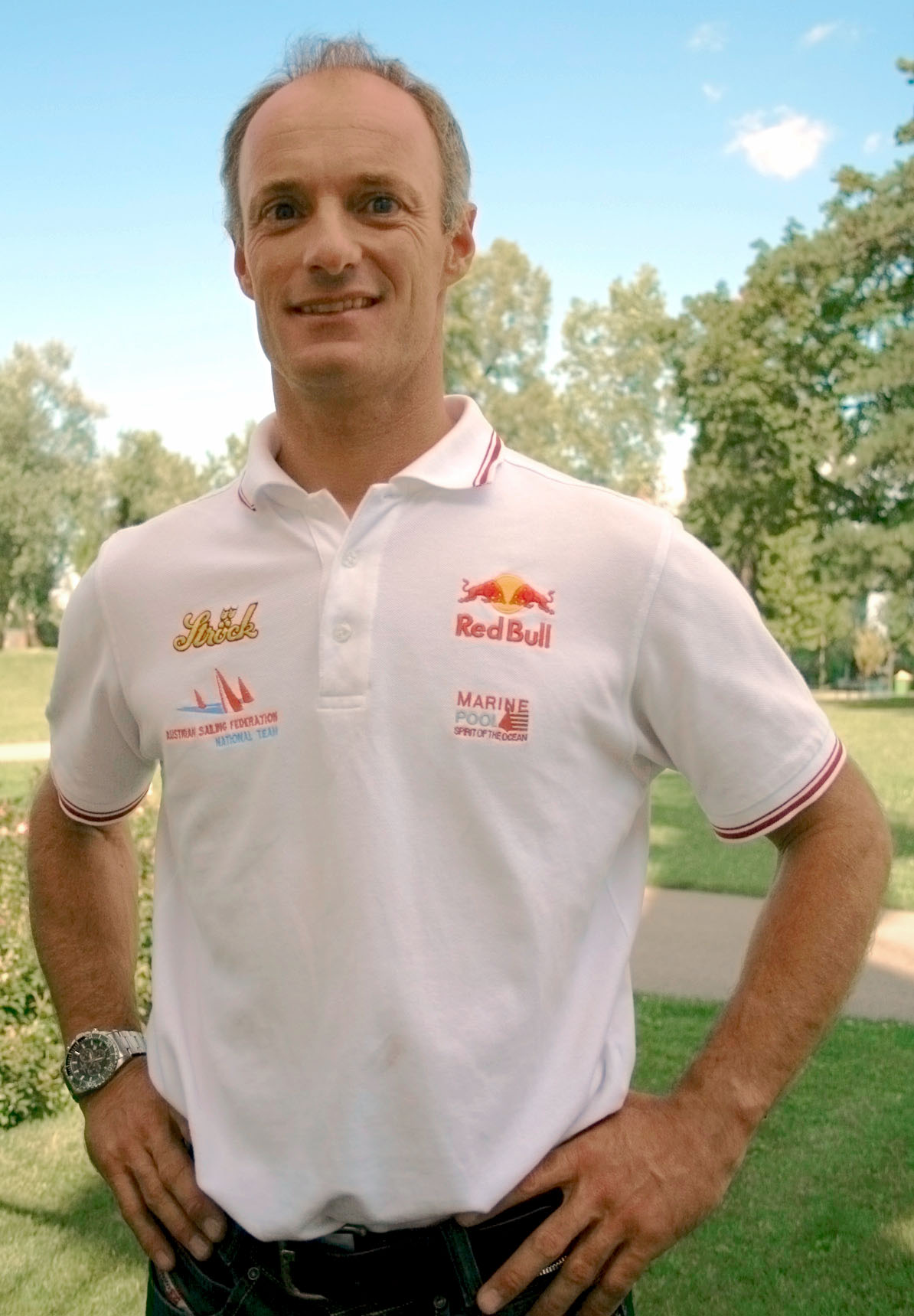
Hans-Peter Steniacher, gold medallist at the 2000 Olympics

Medal	Name	Sport	Event
Gold	Christoph Sieber	Sailing	Men's Mistral
Gold	Roman Hagara; Hans-Peter Steinacher	Sailing	Men's Tornado
Silver	Stephanie Graf	Athletics	Women's 800 metres

== Athletics ==
Key

- Note–Ranks given for track events are within the athlete's heat only
- Q = Qualified for the next round by position in race or, in field events, by achieving the automatic qualification target
- q = Qualified for the next round as a fastest loser or, in field events, by position without achieving the qualifying target

Men
Track and road events

Athlete	Event	Heat		Quarterfinal		Semifinal		Final	
Athlete	Event	Time	Rank	Time	Rank	Time	Rank	Time	Rank
Martin Lachkovics	100 m	10.41	4 q	10.44	8	Did not advance			
Martin Lachkovics	200 m	21.00	4	Did not advance					
Elmar Lichtenegger	100 m hurdles	13.65	4 Q	13.73	4 Q	13.59	8	Did not advance	
Günther Weidlinger	3000 m steeple	8:24.07	3 Q	—				8:26.70	8
Michael Buchleitner	Marathon	—						2:19:26	33

Field events

Athlete	Event	Qualification		Final	
Athlete	Event	Result	Rank	Result	Rank
Gregor Hoegler	Javelin throw	80.89	17	Did not advance	

Combined events – Decathlon

Athlete	Event	100 m	LJ	SP	HJ	400 m	110H	DT	PV	JT	1500 m	Final	Rank
Klaus Ambrosch	Result	11.01	50.23	14.92	4:40.94	15.30	41.22	67.94	7.17	1.91	4.60	7917	18
Klaus Ambrosch	Points	858	854	808	723	804	859	659	790	858	674	7917	18

Women
Track and road events

Athlete	Event	Heat		Quarterfinal		Semifinal		Final	
Athlete	Event	Time	Rank	Time	Rank	Time	Rank	Time	Rank
Karin Mayr	100 m	11.50	4	Did not advance					
Karin Mayr	200 m	23.90	6	Did not advance					
Stephanie Graf	800 m	1.58.39	1 Q	—		1:57.56	1 Q	1:56.64	2nd place, silver medalist(s)
Susanne Pumper	5000 m	15:16.66	5	—				Did not advance	

Field events

Athlete	Event	Qualification		Final	
Athlete	Event	Result	Rank	Result	Rank
Valentina Fedjuschina	Shot Put	17.84	12 Q	17.14	12
Linda Horvath	High Jump	1.89	25	Did not advance	
Doris Auer	Pole Vault	4.30	13	4.35	9

== Beach volleyball ==
Athlete	Event	Preliminary round	Preliminary elimination		Round of 16	Quarterfinals	Semifinals	Final / BM	
Athlete	Event	Opposition Score	Opposition Score	Opposition Score	Opposition Score	Opposition Score	Opposition Score	Opposition Score	Rank
Nikolas Berger; Oliver Stamm	Men's	Høidalen – Kjemperud (NOR); L 6–15	Raffaelli – Pimponi (ITA); W 15–9	Grinlaubs – Slack (AUS); W 15–10	de Melo – Santos (BRA); L 14–16	Did not advance			=9

== Canoeing ==
=== Sprint ===
Athlete	Event	Heat		Semifinal		Final	
Athlete	Event	Time	Rank	Time	Rank	Time	Rank
Ursula Profanter	Women's K-1 500 m	1:56.118	7 QS	1:55.626	3 QF	2:20.598	8

=== Slalom ===
Athlete	Event	Preliminary						Final					
Athlete	Event	Run 1	Rank	Run 2	Rank	Total	Rank	Run 1	Rank	Run 2	Rank	Total	Rank
Helmut Oblinger	Men's K-1	125.94	1	128.00	8	253.94	1 Q	112.58	4	113.87	10	226.45	4
Manuel Köhler	Men's K-1	128.34	6	127.45	7	253.94	4 Q	115.06	10	111.74	4	226.80	6
Violetta Oblinger-Peters	Women's K-1	149.71	7	158.77	16	308.48	10 Q	145.64	15	136.65	13	282.29	15

== Cycling ==
=== Road ===
Athlete	Event	Time	Rank
Matthias Buxhofer	Men's Road race	51	5:30:46
Gerrit Glomser	Men's Road race	41	5:30:46
Thomas Mühlbacher	Men's Road race	DNF	
Peter Wrolich	Men's Road race	23	5:30:46
René Haselbacher	Men's Road race	DNF	
René Haselbacher	Men's Time trial	1:02:38	34

=== Track ===
Athlete	Event	Points	Rank
Franz Stocher	Men's points race	8	6
Werner Riebenbauer; Roland Garber	Men's Madison	10	5
Michaela Brunngraber	Women's points race	0	15

== Diving ==
Athlete	Event	Preliminary		Semifinal				Final		Total	
Athlete	Event	Points	Rank	Points	Rank	Total	Rank	Points	Rank	Points	Rank
Richard Frece	Men's 3 m springboard	328.68	31	Did not advance							
Marion Reiff	Women's 10 m platform	206.55	37	Did not advance							
Anja Richter-Libiseller	Women's 10 m platform	314.31	6 Q	168.78	10	483.09	7 Q	313.38	8	482.16	7
Marion Reiff; Anja Richter-Libiseller	Women's 10 m platform synchronized	—								294.00	4

== Equestrian ==
Dressage

(Total scores are the average of all three rounds for the individual competition, and the three best total scores of individual round 1 for the team competition.)

Athlete	Horse	Event	Grand Prix Test		Grand Prix Special			Grand Prix Freestyle		Total	
Athlete	Horse	Event	Score	Rank	Score	Total	Rank	Score	Rank	Score	Rank
Peter Gmoser	Candidat	Individual	65.52	24 Q	66.51	132.03	21	Did not advance			21
Stefan Peter	Bon Voyage	Individual	63.80	38	Did not advance						38

Jumping

Athlete	Horse	Event	Qualification								Final				Total	
Athlete	Horse	Event	Round 1		Round 2			Round 3			Round A		Round B		Total	
Athlete	Horse	Event	Penalties	Rank	Penalties	Total	Rank	Penalties	Total	Rank	Penalties	Rank	Penalties	Rank	Penalties	Rank
Anton-Martin Bauer	Equo	Individual	24.50	65	8.00	32.50	58	8.00	40.50	50	12.00	=20	16.00	26	28.00	26

== Fencing ==
Six fencers, five men and one woman, represented Austria in 2000.

Men

Athlete	Event	Round of 64	Round of 32	Round of 16	Quarterfinal	Semifinal	Final / BM	
Athlete	Event	Opposition Result	Opposition Result	Opposition Result	Opposition Result	Opposition Result	Opposition Result	Rank
Joachim Wendt	Individual foil	Bye	Tucker (CUB); L 5–15	Did not advance				22
Michael Ludwig	Individual foil	Bye	Gomes (POR); L 12–15	Did not advance				22
Oliver Kayser	Individual épée	Bye	Zhao (CHN); L 12–15	Did not advance				20
Christoph Marik	Individual épée	Bye	Srecki (FRA); L 10–15	Did not advance				26
Michael Switak	Individual épée	Shabalin (KAZ); W 14–13	Rota (ITA); L 11–15	Did not advance				27
Oliver Kayser; Christoph Marik; Michael Switak	Men's team épée	—		Belarus; L 44–45	—	Placement 9–11; China; W 45–35	Ninth place match Estonia; L 44–45	10

Athlete	Event	Round of 64	Round of 32	Round of 16	Quarterfinal	Semifinal	Final / BM	
Athlete	Event	Opposition Result	Opposition Result	Opposition Result	Opposition Result	Opposition Result	Opposition Result	Rank
Andrea Rentmeister	Individual épée	Bye	Halls (AUS); W 15–14	Flessel-Colovic (FRA); L 12–15	Did not advance			13

== Handball ==
Team roster

- Ausra Fridrikas
- Barbara Strass
- Doris Meltzer
- Iris Morhammer
- Laura Fritz
- Natalia Rusnatchenko
- Sorina Teodorovic
- Stanka Bozovic
- Steffi Ofenböck
- Svetlana Mugoša-Antić
- Tanja Logvin
- Tatjana Dschandschgawa
- Birgit Engl
- Ariane Maier
- Rima Sypkus

Preliminary round

Pos	Team	Pld	W	D	L	GF	GA	GD	Pts	Qualification
1	Norway	4	4	0	0	101	72	+29	8	Quarterfinals
2	Denmark	4	3	0	1	124	83	+41	6	Quarterfinals
3	Austria	4	2	0	2	131	90	+41	4	Quarterfinals
4	Brazil	4	1	0	3	100	133	−33	2	Quarterfinals
5	Australia	4	0	0	4	59	137	−78	0	Ninth place game

19 September 2000; 21:30	Austria	26–30	Denmark	Pavilion 2, Sydney; Referees: Kohout, Dolejš (CZE)
19 September 2000; 21:30	Fridrikas 11	(13–16)	Andersen, Kiærskou 7	Pavilion 2, Sydney; Referees: Kohout, Dolejš (CZE)
19 September 2000; 21:30	3× (yellow card) 1× (suspension)		2× (yellow card) 3× (suspension)	Pavilion 2, Sydney; Referees: Kohout, Dolejš (CZE)

21 September 2000; 14:30	Brazil	26–45	Austria	Pavilion 2, Sydney; Referees: Salim, Hassan (EGY)
21 September 2000; 14:30	L. Silva 8	(14–21)	Fridrikas 11	Pavilion 2, Sydney; Referees: Salim, Hassan (EGY)
21 September 2000; 14:30	3× (yellow card) 7× (suspension)		3× (yellow card) 2× (suspension)	Pavilion 2, Sydney; Referees: Salim, Hassan (EGY)

23 September 2000; 19:30	Austria	39–10	Australia	Pavilion 2, Sydney; Referees: Klucsó, Lekrinszky (HUN)
23 September 2000; 19:30	Logwin 8	(17–6)	three players 2	Pavilion 2, Sydney; Referees: Klucsó, Lekrinszky (HUN)
23 September 2000; 19:30	2× (yellow card) 4× (suspension) 1× (red card)		3× (yellow card) 2× (suspension)	Pavilion 2, Sydney; Referees: Klucsó, Lekrinszky (HUN)

25 September 2000; 19:30	Norway	24–21	Austria	Pavilion 2, Sydney; Referees: Gallego, Lamas (ESP)
25 September 2000; 19:30	Grini 8	(12–7)	Fridrikas 8	Pavilion 2, Sydney; Referees: Gallego, Lamas (ESP)
25 September 2000; 19:30	4× (yellow card) 5× (suspension)		4× (yellow card) 3× (suspension)	Pavilion 2, Sydney; Referees: Gallego, Lamas (ESP)

Quarterfinal

28 September 2000
16:30
Austria
27–28 (ET)
Hungary
The Dome, Sydney
Referees: Kohout, Dolejš (CZE)
Logwin 9
(12–14)
Ág. Farkas 8
3× (yellow card) 8× (suspension) 1× (red card)

4× (yellow card) 7× (suspension)

FT: 25–25 ET: 2–3

5–8th place semifinals

30 September 2000; 11:30	Austria	29–23	Romania	The Dome, Sydney; Referees: Hansson, Olsson (SWE)
30 September 2000; 11:30	Fridrikas 8	(12–12)	Drăgănescu 6	The Dome, Sydney; Referees: Hansson, Olsson (SWE)
30 September 2000; 11:30	3× (yellow card) 3× (suspension)		1× (yellow card) 4× (suspension)	The Dome, Sydney; Referees: Hansson, Olsson (SWE)

Fifth place game

1 October 2000
11:30
France
32–33 (ET)
Austria
The Dome, Sydney
Referees: Marić, Gardinovački (FRY)
Ludwig 9
(8–13)
Logwin 12
3× (yellow card) 2× (suspension)

3× (yellow card) 1× (suspension)

FT: 25–25 ET: 7–8

== Judo ==
Men

Athlete	Event	Preliminary Round	Round of 32	Round of 16	Quarterfinals	Semifinals	Repechage 1	Repechage 2	Repechage 3	Final / BM	
Athlete	Event	Opposition score	Opposition score	Opposition score	Opposition score	Opposition score	Opposition score	Opposition score	Opposition score	Opposition score	Rank
Christoph Stangl	-73 kg	Bye	Lewak (POL); L 0000-1000	Did not advance							
Patrick Reiter	-81 kg	Bye	Wanner (GER); L 0001-0010	Did not advance							
Franz Birkfellner	-100 kg	Bye	Geraldino (DOM); W 0201-0010	Hand (USA); L 0000-1000	Did not advance						

== Rowing ==
Men

Athlete	Event	Heats		Repechage		Semifinals		Final	
Athlete	Event	Time	Rank	Time	Rank	Time	Rank	Time	Rank
Raphael Hartl; Horst Nußbaumer; Arnold Jonke; Norbert Lambing	Quadruple sculls	5:59.41	4 R	6:05.65	2 SF	6:00.27	5 FB	5:57.58	11
Helfried Jurtschitsch; Bernd Wakolbinger; Martin Kobau; Wolfgang Sigl	Lightweight coxless four	6:16.94	3 SF	Bye		6:10.11	4 FB	6:10.11	9

== Sailing ==
Four men and one woman participated in the sailing competition for Austria. They won two gold medals.

Men

Athlete	Event	Race											Net points	Final rank
Athlete	Event	1	2	3	4	5	6	7	8	9	10	11	Net points	Final rank
Christoph Sieber	Mistral	1	2	1	~~24~~	1	10	7	~~23~~	4	5	7	38	1st place, gold medalist(s)

Women

Athlete	Event	Race											Net points	Final rank
Athlete	Event	1	2	3	4	5	6	7	8	9	10	11	Net points	Final rank
Denise Cesky	Europe	22	22	6	9	15	9	14	16	~~26~~	~~24~~	21	134	20

Open

Athlete	Event	Race											Net points	Final rank
Athlete	Event	1	2	3	4	5	6	7	8	9	10	11	Net points	Final rank
Andreas Geritzer	Laser	2	11	~~38~~	9	11	7	15	15	~~DNF~~	5	3	78	5
Roman Hagara; Hans Peter Steinacher	Tornado	3	1	2	1	1	4	1	1	2	~~DNC~~	~~DNC~~	16	1st place, gold medalist(s)

== Shooting ==
Men

Athlete	Event	Qualification		Final	
Athlete	Event	Score	Rank	Score	Rank
Thomas Farnik	50 m rifle three positions	1162	12	Did not advance	
Thomas Farnik	50 m rifle prone	585	44	Did not advance	
Thomas Farnik	10 m air rifle	588	18	Did not advance	
Mario Knögler	50 m rifle three positions	1164	9	Did not advance	
Mario Knögler	50 m rifle prone	596	9	Did not advance	
Mario Knögler	10 m air rifle	591	9	Did not advance	
Wolfram Waibel, Jr.	10 m air rifle	588	18	Did not advance	

Women

Athlete	Event	Qualification		Final	
Athlete	Event	Score	Rank	Score	Rank
Monika Haselsberger	10 m air rifle	393	9	Did not advance	

== Swimming ==
Men

Athlete	Event	Heat		Semifinal		Final	
Athlete	Event	Time	Rank	Time	Rank	Time	Rank
Hannes Kalteis	400 m freestyle	4:03.66	42	—		Did not advance	
Hannes Kalteis	1500 m freestyle	15:32.90	25	—		Did not advance	
Michael Windisch	200 m butterfly	2:01.20	28	Did not advance			
Patrick Schmollinger	100 m breaststroke	1:02.87	22	Did not advance			
Maxim Podoprigora	200 m breaststroke	2:14.37	4 Q	2:14.20	6	Did not advance	
Markus Rogan	100 m backstroke	57.35	33	Did not advance			
Markus Rogan	200 m backstroke	2:02.84	27	Did not advance			
Michael Windisch	200 m individual medley	2:05.15	27	Did not advance			
Michael Windisch	400 m individual medley	4:24.62	26	—		Did not advance	

Women

Athlete	Event	Heat		Semifinal		Final	
Athlete	Event	Time	Rank	Time	Rank	Time	Rank
Judith Draxler	50 m freestyle	26.26	31	Did not advance			
Judith Draxler	100 m freestyle	57.40	27	Did not advance			
Petra Zahrl	200 m butterfly	2:13.29	23	Did not advance			
Elvira Fischer	200 m breaststroke	2:30.05	19	Did not advance			

== Table tennis ==
Men

Athlete	Event	Group stage			Round of 32	Round of 16	Quarterfinals	Semifinals	Final / BM	
Athlete	Event	Opposition Result	Opposition Result	Rank	Opposition Result	Opposition Result	Opposition Result	Opposition Result	Opposition Result	Rank
Werner Schlager	Singles	Bye			Heister (NED); W 3–2	Boll (GER); W 3–2	Kong (CHN); L 2–3	Did not advance		5
Ding Yi	Singles	Hamam (TUN); W 3–0	Chen (TPE); L 0–3	2	Did not advance					=33
Werner Schlager; Karl Jindrak	Doubles	Bye			—	Heister / Keen (NED); W 3–0	Chila / Gatien (FRA); L 2–3	Did not advance		=5

Women

Athlete	Event	Group stage			Round of 32	Round of 16	Quarterfinals	Semifinals	Final / BM	
Athlete	Event	Opposition Result	Opposition Result	Rank	Opposition Result	Opposition Result	Opposition Result	Opposition Result	Opposition Result	Rank
Liu Jia	Singles	Aganović (CRO); W 3–1	Ramírez (CUB); W 3–2	1 Q	—	Li (SIN); L 1–3	Did not advance			=17
Liu Jia; Judith Herczig	Doubles	Geng / Roussy (CAN); W 2–1	Miao / Zhou (AUS); L 1–2	2	—	Did not advance				=17

== Taekwondo ==
Athlete	Event	Round of 16	Quarterfinals	Semifinals	Repechage Quarterfinals	Repechage Semifinals	Final / BM	
Athlete	Event	Opposition Result	Opposition Result	Opposition Result	Opposition Result	Opposition Result	Opposition Result	Rank
Tuncay Çalışkan	Men's −68 kg	Sin (KOR); L 3–7	Did not advance		Dzitiev (RUS); W 6–0	Acharki (GER); W 7–7	Saei (IRI); L 7–7	4

== Tennis ==
Women

Athlete	Event	Round of 64	Round of 32	Round of 16	Quarterfinals	Semifinals	Final / BM	
Athlete	Event	Opposition Score	Opposition Score	Opposition Score	Opposition Score	Opposition Score	Opposition Score	Rank
Sylvia Plischke	Singles	Grande (ARG); L 2–6, 2–6	Did not advance					=33
Barbara Schett	Singles	Molik (AUS); W 7–6, 6–2	Salerni (ARG); W 7–6, 6–4	Halard-Decugis (FRA); W 2–6, 6–2, 6–1	Dementieva (RUS); L 6–2, 2–6, 2–6	Did not advance		=5
Patricia Wartusch	Singles	Barabanschikova (BLR); W 6–4, 6–2	A Sánchez Vicario (ESP); L 2–6, 4–6	Did not advance				=17
Barbara Schett; Patricia Wartusch	Doubles	—	Barabanschikova / Zvereva (BLR); L 2–6, 2–6	Did not advance				=17

== Triathlon ==
Athlete	Event	Swim	Trans. 1	Cycle	Trans. 2	Run	Total	Rank
Johannes Enzenhofer	Men's triathlon	17:59.99	22.80	58:46.20	25.30	33:28.19	1:51:02.48	29

== Notes ==
- Wallechinsky, David (2004). The Complete Book of the Summer Olympics (Athens 2004 Edition). Toronto, Canada. ISBN 1-894963-32-6.
- International Olympic Committee (2001). The Results. Retrieved 12 November 2005.
- Sydney Organising Committee for the Olympic Games (2001). Official Report of the XXVII Olympiad Volume 1: Preparing for the Games. Retrieved 20 November 2005.
- Sydney Organising Committee for the Olympic Games (2001). Official Report of the XXVII Olympiad Volume 2: Celebrating the Games. Retrieved 20 November 2005.
- Sydney Organising Committee for the Olympic Games (2001). The Results. Retrieved 20 November 2005.
- International Olympic Committee Web Site
