= Natalya Goncharova =

Natal(i)ya or Natalia Goncharova may refer to:

- Natalia Goncharova (1881–1962), Russian Cubo-Futurism painter
- Natalia Goncharova (diver) (born 1985), Russian diver
- Natalya Goncharova (fencer) (born 1974), Kazakhstani fencer
- Nataliya Goncharova (volleyball) (born 1989), Russian volleyball player
- Natalia Pushkina née Goncharova, wife of poet Alexander Pushkin
- Natalia Gontcharova (handballer) (born 1972), Russian handball world champion
