= Doris Meltzer (handballer) =

Austrian handball player (born 1973)

Personal information
- Nationality: Austrian
- Born: 21 June 1973 (age 53) Vienna, Austria

Sport
- Sport: Handball

Senior clubs
- Years: Team
- -2000: (Austria) UHC Stockerau
- 2000-?: (Austria) Hypo Niederösterreich
National team
- Years: Team
- –: Austria
Medal record
World Championship
| Bronze medal – third place | 1999 Denmark & Norway |

Doris Meltzer (born 21 June 1973) is an Austrian handball player. She competed in the women's tournament at the 2000 Summer Olympics.

She also won bronze medal at the 1999 World Women's Handball Championship, which is the only World Championship medal Austria have ever won. (as of 2026)
