= Heidi Astrup =

Danish handball player (born 1972)

Personal information
- Nationality: Danish
- Born: 31 May 1972 (age 54) Viborg, Denmark
- Height: 1.75 m (5 ft 9 in) 65 kg

Sport
- Sport: Handball
- Position: Playmaker
- Current club: Retired
- Number: 20

Senior clubs
- Years: Team
- 1988–1997: Viborg HK
- 1997–1998: Chateraise
- 1998–2003: Viborg HK
- 2003–2005: Aalborg DH
- 2005–2007: Viborg HK
National team
Years	Team	Apps	(Gls)
1990–2007	Denmark	104	(269)
Medal record
Women's handball
Representing Denmark
Olympic Games
Gold medal – first place	1996 Atlanta	Team
World Championship
Bronze medal – third place	1995 Austria and Hungary	Team
European Championship
Gold medal – first place	1994 Germany	Team
Gold medal – first place	1996 Denmark	Team
- Updated on 1 July 2013

Heidi Astrup (born 31 May 1972) is a Danish former team handball player and Olympic champion. She received a gold medal with the Danish national team at the 1996 Summer Olympics in Atlanta. She is two times European champion, and received a bronze medal at the 1995 World championship.

For a decade she was one of the dominant back players in the Danish league, where she played around 400 matches.

== Career ==
Astrup started playing handball in Viborg HK in 1979. In 1989 she was promoted to the top flight with Viborg HK, where the club quickly became one of the dominant clubs. At the same time, she began featuring for the Danish national team, when Ulrik Wilbek became the coach. In the 1994-95 season she was the topscorer in the Danish league with 157 goals.

In 1996 she was part of the team reaching the final of the 1996 European Women's Handball Championship, but she had to see her team win the final from the stands, as she was not a part of the selected team. The day after she announced her retirement from the national team. It would take 11 years and the promotion of a new coach, Jan Pytlick for her to return to the Danish national team.

In 1997 she joined the Japanese club Chateraise, but was back in Danish handball in 1999 at her old club Viborg HK. In the meantime Viborg HK had hired Ulrik Wilbek, the coach that did not include her in the national team squad. The two had however reconciled, and Astrup was granted a key role on the Viborg team that won the Danish League and EHF-Cup in the 1999–2000 season.

She joined league rivals Aalborg DH in 2003, before once again returning to Viborg HK in 2005 where she played the last two years of her active career. In 2014 she made a brief return at the age of 42, again for Viborg Hk.

Today she works as a Accountant.

== Achievements ==
- Damehåndboldligaen:
  - Winner: 1994, 1995, 1996, 1997, 1999, 2000, 2001, 2002, 2006
  - Silver Medalist: 1991, 1993, 1998, 2005, 2007
- DHF Landspokalturneringen:
  - Winner: 1996
- EHF Champions League:
  - Winner: 2006
  - Finalist: 1997, 2001
- EHF Cup:
  - Winner: 1994, 1999
