= Silje Bolset =

Norwegian handball player

Øystein Havang
Personal information
- Nationality: Norwegian
- Born: 5 March 1975 (age 51)

Sport
- Sport: Handball
- Position: Right back

Senior clubs
- Years: Team
- –1996: Stord Idrettslag
- 1996–1999: Byåsen IL
- 1999–2003: Sola HK
National team
Years	Team	Apps	(Gls)
1996–1997	Norway	16	(17)
Medal record
European championship
Silver medal – second place	1996 Denmark	Team

Silje Elin Bolset (born 5. march 1975) is a Norwegian former handball player. She played 16 matches for the Norway women's national handball team from 1996 to 1997. She participated at the 1996 European Women's Handball Championship, where the Norwegian team placed second.

She retired in 2003 due to injuries.
