= Monique Tijsterman =

Dutch handball coach (born 1969)

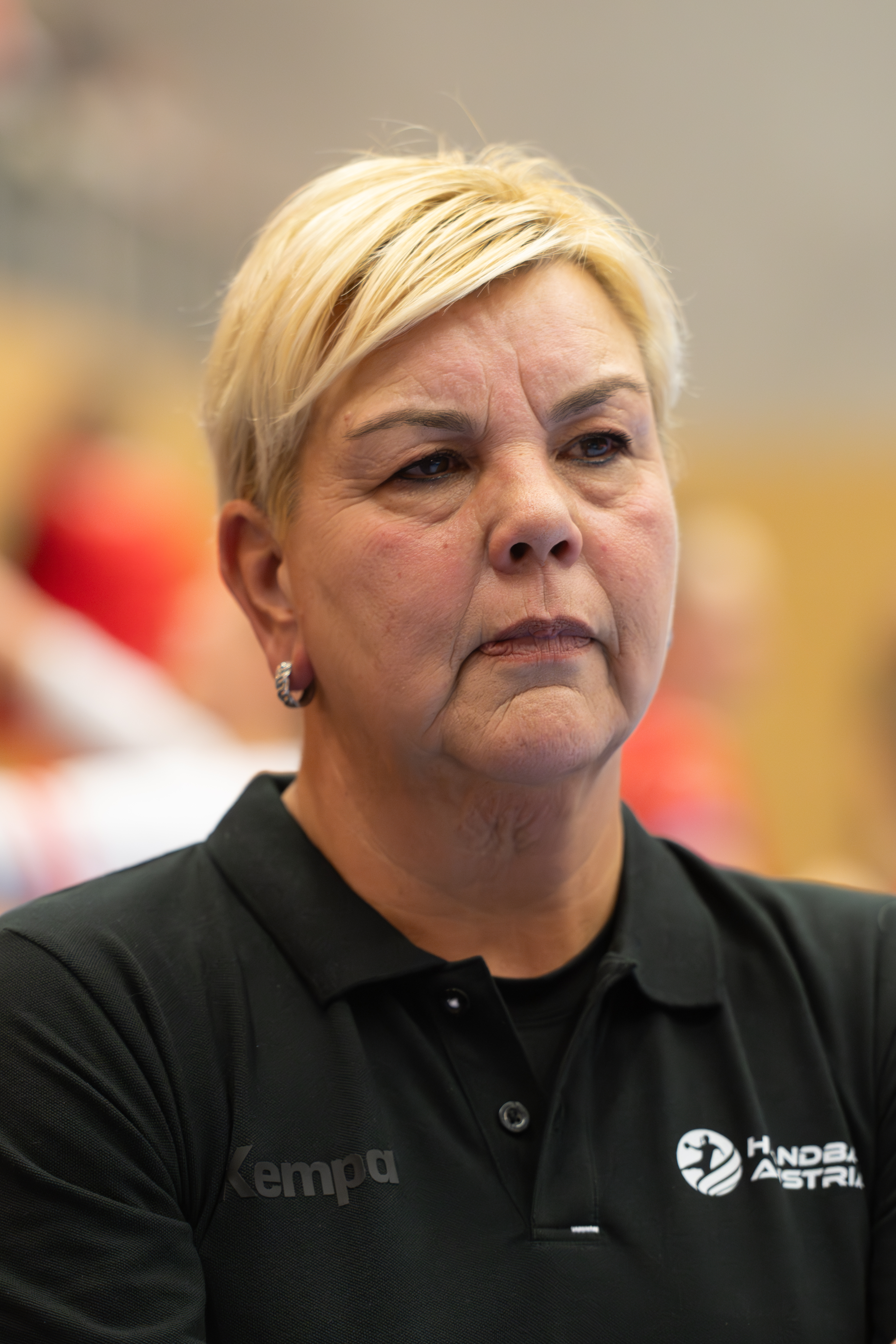

Personal information
- Nationality: Dutch
- Born: 10 March 1969 (age 57) Amsterdam, Netherlands

Sport
- Sport: Handball

Teams managed
- Years: Team
- 1993–1997: HV Aalsmeer
- 1997–2001: Netherlands (Asst. coach)
- 2001–2013: Netherlands U-19
- 2006–2014: HandbalAcademie
- 2004–2016: Limburg Lions
- 2017–2019: SV Dalfsen Handbal
- 2018–2019: Netherlands U-19
- 2019–2021: Netherlands (technical director)
- 2021–2022: Netherlands
- 2024–: Austria

Monique Tijsterman (born 10 March 1969) is a Dutch handball coach and former player. Since February 2024, she has served as head coach of the Austrian women's national team. She is considered to be one of the most important figures in Dutch handball history.

Tijsterman coached the Dutch national team at the 2021 World Women's Handball Championship, replacing Emmanuel Mayonnade.
