= Anne Dorthe Tanderup =

Danish handball player (born 1972)

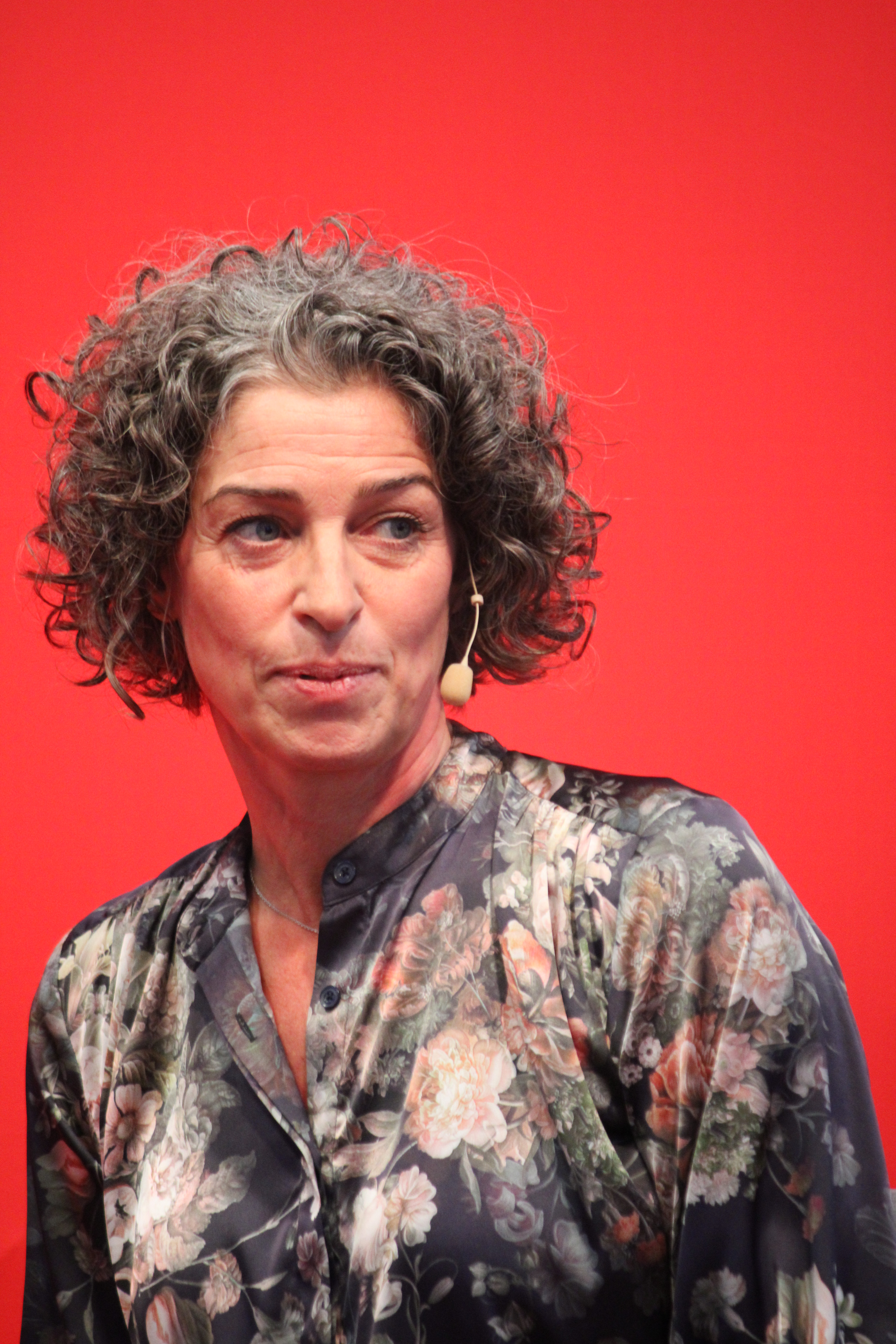
- Tanderup (2025)

Personal information
- Full name: Anne Dorthe Tanderup
- Nationality: Danish
- Born: 24 April 1972 (age 54) Aarhus, Denmark
- Height: 1.71 m (5 ft 7 in)

Sport
- Sport: Handball
- Position: Back

Youth career
- Years: Team
- 1981–1990: Brabrand IF

Senior clubs
- Years: Team
- 1990–1991: Brabrand IF
- 1991–1992: Hypobank Samsung
- 1992–1998: Viborg HK
National team
Years	Team	Apps	(Gls)
1991–1997	Danmark	88	(179)
Medal record
Women's handball
Representing Denmark
Olympic Games
Gold medal – first place	1996 Atlanta	Team competition
World Championship
Silver medal – second place	1993 Norway	Team competition
Bronze medal – third place	1995 Austria/Hungary	Team competition
Gold medal – first place	1997 Germany	Team competition
European Championship
Gold medal – first place	1994 Germany	Team competition
Gold medal – first place	1996 Denmark	Team competition

Anne Dorthe Tanderup (born 24 April 1972) is a Danish former team handball player, Olympic champion and World Champion.

== Career ==
Tanderup's career as a handball player commenced when joining Brabrand IF's youth team. Shortly after being drafted to the senior team, she had a stint with the long-reigning champion of the Austrian league Hypobank Samsung (later renamed to Hypo Niederösterreich) where she won the league championship as well as the Champions League. After one season, she returned to Denmark, where she spent the rest of her career at Viborg HK. While at Viborg HK, the team won the Danish Championship four times in a row, became three-times Danish Cup winner and won the EHF Cup in 1994. In 1997 she managed to reach the Champions League finals with Viborg HK, but the team lost to Mar Valencia.

Tanderup received a gold medal at the 1996 Summer Olympics with the Danish national team, became World Champion at the 1997 World Championship and is a two-times European Champion.

During her sports career, Tanderup struggled with several injuries to her knee. Eventually, 25 years of age, her handball career came to an abrupt end at the 1997 World Championship, when she suffered a fatal knee injury causing chronic pain ever since.

== Private life ==
After several years out of public view, she started studying nutrition in 2008 and works as a nutritionist now. In her book “Min vej til et sundt liv” (Danish: “My way to a healthy life”) published in 2013, she describes the shift in focus in her life following the end of her sports career.

She is married to former professional Danish road bicycle racer and Tour de France winner Bjarne Riis whom she met at the 1996 Summer Olympics. Together with their four sons, the couple lives in Lugano, Switzerland.
