= Mette Davidsen =

Norwegian handball player (born 1976)

Personal information
- Nationality: Norwegian
- Born: 26 June 1976 (age 50) Bergen, Norway
- Height: 168 cm (66 in)

Sport
- Sport: Handball
- Position: Centre back

Youth career
- Years: Team
- –: Åsane IL
- 1992-1995: Tertnes IL

Senior clubs
- Years: Team
- 1995-1996: Tertnes IL
- 1996-1998: Hypo Niederösterreich
- 1998-2002: Tertnes IL
- 2006-2009: Tertnes IL
National team
Years	Team	Apps	(Gls)
1993–2001	Norway	148	(256)
Medal record
World championship
Gold medal – first place	1999 Denmark/Norway	Team competition
Silver medal – second place	1997 Germany	Team competition
Bronze medal – third place	1993 Norway	Team competition
European championship
Gold medal – first place	1998 Netherlands	Team competition
Silver medal – second place	1996 Denmark	Team competition

Mette Davidsen (born 26 June 1976) is a Norwegian team handball player and World Champion from 1999 with the Norwegian national team. She received a silver medal at the 1997 World Championship and a bronze medal in 1993. She is European Champion from 1998 after beating Denmark in the final, and received a silver medal in 1996. Mette Davidsen played 148 games for the national team during her career, scoring 256 goals.

Davidsen was awarded the Håndballstatuetten trophy from the Norwegian Handball Federation in 2013.
