= Steffi Ofenböck =

Austrian handball player (born 1981)

Personal information
- Full name: Stephanie Ofenböck
- Nationality: Austria
- Born: 17 March 1981 (age 45) Vienna, Austria
- Height: 177 cm (70 in)

Sport
- Sport: Handball
- Position: Centre back

Senior clubs
- Years: Team
- 1993–1997: HC Maroltinger
- 1997–1999: UHC Stockerau
- 1999–2000: Hypo Niederösterreich
- 2000–2001: Tertnes HE
- 2001–2002: Bayer Leverkusen
- 2002–2008: 1. FC Nürnberg
- 2009–2011: Thüringer HC
- 2014–2014: ESV 1927 Regensburg
National team
Years	Team	Apps	(Gls)
1996–2011	Austria	200	(701)
Medal record
European Championship
Bronze medal – third place	1996 Denmark
World Championship
Bronze medal – third place	1999 Denmark & Norway

Stephanie "Steffi" Subke (née Ofenböck 17 March 1981) is an Austrian female handball player. She was a member of the Austria women's national handball team. She was part of the team at the 2000 Summer Olympics, playing seven matches. She is included in the Austrian Handball Federation Hall of fame.

At the 1996 European Championship she won a bronze medal with Austria. Three years later she won another bronze medal at the 1999 World Women's Handball Championship. Those are two date (as of 2026) the only two medals Austria have ever won.

== Titles ==
=== Club ===
- EHF Champions League: 2000
- EHF Challenge Cup: 2004
- Austrian Championship: 2000
- Austrian Cup: 2000
- German Championship: 2005, 2007, 2008, 2011
- German Cup: 2002, 2004, 2005, 2011

=== National team ===
- Bronze medal at the 1996 European Women's Handball Championship
- Bronze medal at the 1999 World Women's Handball Championship
