= Susanne Munk Wilbek =

Danish handball player (born 1967)

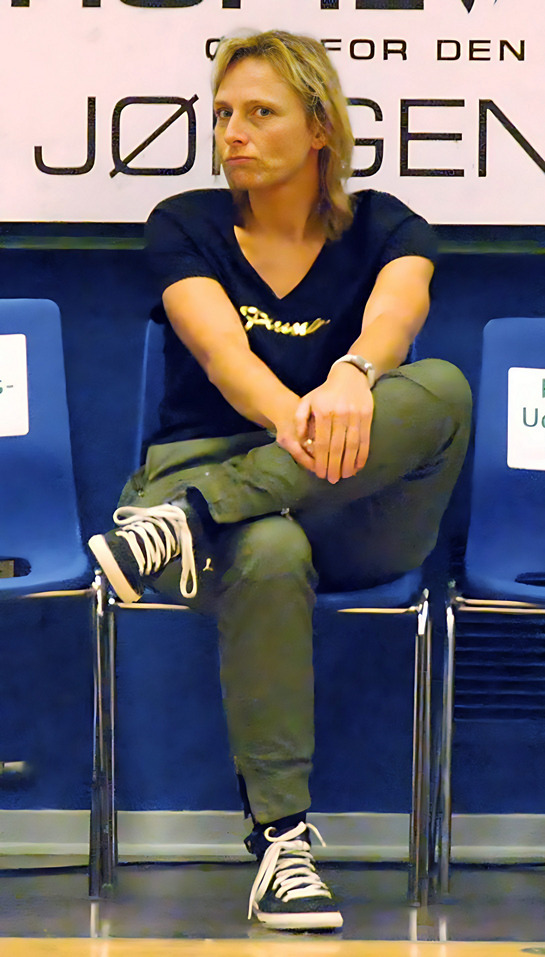
- Susanne Munk Wilbek in September 2011. (Photo: Lars Schmidt)

Personal information
- Nationality: Danish
- Born: 12 October 1967 (age 59) Hvorslev, Denmark
- Height: 180 cm (71 in)

Sport
- Sport: Handball
- Position: Goalkeeper

Youth career
- Years: Team
- –: Vellef IF

Senior clubs
- Years: Team
- 1985-2001: Viborg HK
National team
Years	Team	Apps	(Gls)
1987-2000	Denmark	171	(3)

Teams managed
- 2006-2008: Viborg HK assistant coach
- 2008-2011: Skjern Håndbold men's team goalkeeping coach
- 2011: Viborg HK; Sporting director / goalkeeping coach
- 2017-: Viborg HK assistant coach
Medal record
Women's handball
Representing Denmark
Olympic Games
Gold medal – first place	1996 Atlanta	Team competition
World Championship
Gold medal – first place	1997 Germany	Team
Silver medal – second place	1993 Norway	Team
Bronze medal – third place	1995 Austria/Hungary	Team
European Championship
Gold medal – first place	1994 Germany	Team
Gold medal – first place	1996 Denmark	Team
Silver medal – second place	1998 Netherlands	Team

Susanne Munk Wilbek (born Munk Lauritsen, 12 October 1967) is a Danish former team handball player and Olympic champion and current handball trainer. She won a gold medal with the Danish national team at the 1996 Summer Olympics in Atlanta. She also won the 1997 World Women's Handball Championship, where she was selected for the tournament all-star team.

Susanne Lauritsen is married to handball coach and politician Ulrik Wilbek.

Lauritsen started playing handball at Vellev IF. She played her entire senior career at the Danish club Viborg HK, where she won 7 Danish championships, 3 Danish cups and the Champions League in 1994.

== Coaching career ==
She became the assistant trainer at Viborg HK in 2006, the club where she played her entire playing career.

In 2008 she joined Skjern Håndbold, as the goalkeeping coach of the mens team.

In 2011 she returned to Viborg as the Sporting director, In 2013 she became the goalkeeping coach instead, but she only lasted for half a year in that position.

In 2017 she returned once again to Viborg HK as assistent coach.
