= Jeanette Nilsen =

Norwegian handball player (born 1972)

Personal information
- Nationality: Norwegian
- Born: 27 June 1972 (age 54) Skien, Norway
- Height: 181 cm (71 in)

Sport
- Sport: Handball
- Position: Goalkeeper
- Current club: Retired

Senior clubs
- Years: Team
- –: Skotfoss
- –: Gulset
- –: Larvik HK
- –: Gjerpen IF
- 1998-2003: Nordstrand IF
- 2003-2007: Horsens HK
- 2007-2008: Stabæk Håndball
- 2008-2009: Njård IL
- 2009-2010: Nordstrand IF
- 2010-2011: Selbu IL
National team
Years	Team	Apps	(Gls)
1991–2000	Norway	91	(2)
Medal record
Olympic Games
Bronze medal – third place	2000 Sydney	Team
World Championship
Gold medal – first place	1999 Denmark/Norway	Team
Silver medal – second place	1997 Germany	Team
European Championship
Gold medal – first place	1998 Netherlands	Team
Silver medal – second place	1996 Denmark	Team

Jeanette Nilsen (born 27 June 1972) is a Norwegian team handball player and World Champion from 1999. She was born in Skien. She received a bronze medal at the 2000 Summer Olympics in Sydney. She became European champion with the Norwegian team in 1998. This was the first time Norway won that title.

She played for Njård IL, Stabæk, Nordstrand IF, Seibu IL, Gjerpen IF, Larvik HK, Gulset and Skotfoss in Norway and Horsens HK in Denmark. She is also a teacher for physical education at Ullern Vgs in Oslo.
