= Barbara Strass =

Austrian handball player (born 1974)

Personal information
- Full name: Barbara Strass
- Nationality: Austrian
- Born: 26 May 1974 (age 52) Vienna, Austria
- Height: 1.60 m (5 ft 3 in)

Sport
- Sport: Handball
- Position: Left Wing
- Current club: —

Senior clubs
- Years: Team
- –1992: WAT Fünfhaus
- 1992–1997: Hypo Niederösterreich
- 1997–1999: UHC Stockerau
- 1999–2001: Frederikshavn fI
- 2001–2007: 1. FC Nürnberg
National team
Years	Team	Apps	(Gls)
–2005	Austria	272	(570)

Teams managed
- –: Austrian Youth National team (assistant)
Medal record
World Championship
Bronze medal – third place	1999 Denmark/Norway	Team
European Championship
Bronze medal – third place	1996 Denmark	Team

Barbara Freibauer (née Strass, 26 May 1974, in Vienna) is a former Austrian international team handball player and coach, European Championship and World Championship bronze medalist and Olympic participant.

Strass holds the Austrian record of most international caps with 272 appearances, and is in Austrian Handball Hall of Fame.

When she retired she took over as the assistant to the Austrian youth national team.

== Achievements ==
- Women Handball Austria:
  - Winner: 1993, 1994, 1995, 1996, 1997
- ÖHB Cup:
  - Winner: 1993, 1994, 1995, 1996, 1997
- Bundesliga:
  - Winner: 2005, 2007
- DHB-Pokal:
  - Winner: 2004, 2005
- EHF Champions League:
  - Winner: 1993, 1994, 1995
- EHF Challenge Cup:
  - Winner: 2004
