= Sahra Hausmann =

Norwegian handball player (born 1973)

Personal information
- Born: 6 February 1973 (age 53) Oslo, Norway
- Height: 170 cm (67 in)

Sport
- Sport: Handball
- Position: Left wing

Senior clubs
- Years: Team
- 1992–2001: Bækkelagets SK
- –: Toten HK
National team
Years	Team	Apps	(Gls)
1993–2000	Norway	90	(193)
Medal record
Representing Norway
Women's handball
World Championship
Gold medal – first place	1999 Norway/Denmark	Team
Silver medal – second place	1997 Germany	Team
European Championship
Gold medal – first place	1998 Netherlands	Team
Silver medal – second place	1996 Denmark	Team

Sahra Hausmann (born 6 February 1973) is a Norwegian team handball player who played for the club Bækkelagets SK and on the Norway women's national handball team. She became World champion at World Women's Handball Championship in 1999, won a silver medal at the World Women's Handball Championship in 1997, and became European champion in 1998. She competed at the 1996 Summer Olympics in Atlanta, where Norway finished fourth.

Hausmann made her debut on the national team in 1993. She scored more than 150 goals for the national team during her career. She stopped on the Norwegian team after the 2000 Olympic Games.

At club level she played her entire elite career at Bækkelagets SK and played 219 games for the club. She is an honorary member of the club. With the club she won the EHF Cup Winners' Cup in 1998 and 1999 and the Norwegian Championship in 1992, 1995 and 1999.

Her daughter Thea Kyvåg is a professional football player.
