= Marion Reiff =

Austrian diver

Personal information
- Nationality: Austrian
- Born: 21 May 1979 (age 47) Vienna, Austria

Sport
- Sport: Diving
Medal record
Women's diving
Representing Austria
European Championships
Bronze medal – third place	1997 Seville	10 m synchro

Marion Reiff (born 21 May 1979) is an Austrian diver. She competed at the 2000 Summer Olympics and the 2004 Summer Olympics.
