= Kristine Duvholt Havnås =

Norwegian handball player (born 1974)

Mona Dahle
Personal information
- Full name: Mona Dahle Sivertsen
- Nationality: Norwegian
- Born: 31 January 1974 (age 52) Tønsberg, Norway
- Height: 166 cm (65 in)

Sport
- Sport: Handball
- Position: Right wing

Senior clubs
- Years: Team
- –: Tønsberg Turn
- ??-2005: Larvik HK
National team
Years	Team	Apps	(Gls)
1991-2001	Norway	208	(377)

Teams managed
- 2005-2006: Larvik HK (assistant)
Medal record
Olympic Games
Silver medal – second place	1992 Barcelona	Team
Bronze medal – third place	2000 Sydney	Team
World Championship
Gold medal – first place	1999 Denmark/Norway	Team
Silver medal – second place	1997 Germany	Team
Bronze medal – third place	1993 Norway	Team
European Championship
Bronze medal – third place	1994 Germany	Team

Kristine Duvholt Havnås (born 31 January 1974) is a former Norwegian team handball player and World Champion. She was born in Tønsberg. She received a silver medal at the 1992 Summer Olympics in Barcelona. She received a bronze medal at the 2000 Summer Olympics in Sydney. She was voted into the All star team at the 1999 World Championship.

== Career ==
Havnås played for entire senior career for Larvik HK, where she won the Norwegian championship 6 times and the 2005 EHF Cup Winners' Cup. She joined Larvik HK from her hometown club Tønsberg Turn.

After her playing career she has been a teacher at Sandefjord Upper Secondary School. In the 2005-06 season she was the assistant coach at Larvik HK.
