= Austria women's national handball team =

Austrian national sports team

Austria

Information
- Association: Austrian Handball Federation
- Coach: Monique Tijsterman
- Assistant coach: Erwin Gierlinger
- Most caps: Barbara Strass (272)
- Most goals: Jasna Kolar-Merdan (1,206)

Colours
1st	2nd

Results

Summer Olympics
- Appearances: 3 (First in 1984)
- Best result: 5th (1992, 2000)

World Championship
- Appearances: 15 (First in 1957)
- Best result: 3rd (1999)

European Women's Handball Championship
- Appearances: 9 (First in 1994)
- Best result: 3rd (1996)
- Last updated on Unknown.

The Austria women's national handball team is the national team of Austria. It is governed by the Austrian Handball Federation and takes part in international team handball competitions.

== History ==
Austria played at the inaugural 1957 World Women's Handball Championship, but after that did not manage to qualify for neither a world championship or olympics for more than 25 years.

The best period in Austrian women's handball was the 1990's, where the team won bronze at both the 1996 European Championship and at the 1999 World Championship, as well as finishing fifth at the 1992 and 2000 Olympics. At that time, the team featured many players who had migrated to Austria to play for the top team Hypo Niederösterreich and then later obtained Austrian citizenship, including many player from Yugoslavia (such as top scorer and 1990 World player of the year Jasna Kolar-Merdan, Stanka Božović, Ljiljana Mugoša or Svetlana Mugoša) and from (former) USSR (such as 1999 World player of the year Ausra Fridrikas, Rima Sypkus, Tatyana Dzhandzhgava, Nataliya Rusnachenko or Tanja Logwin among others).

== Competitive record ==
Champions Runners-up Third place Fourth place

=== Olympic Games ===
Year	Position	GP	W	D	L	GS	GA	GD
(Canada) 1976	Did not qualify							
(Soviet Union) 1980	Did not qualify							
(United States) 1984	6th	5	0	0	5	91	117	−26
(South Korea) 1988	Did not qualify							
(Spain) 1992	5th	4	2	1	1	90	79	+11
(United States) 1996	Did not qualify							
(Australia) 2000	5th	7	4	0	3	220	173	+47
(Greece) 2004	Did not qualify							
(China) 2008	Did not qualify							
(United Kingdom) 2012	Did not qualify							
(Brazil) 2016	Did not qualify							
(Japan) 2020	Did not qualify							
(France) 2024	Did not qualify							
(United States) 2028	TBD							
(Australia) 2032	TBD							
Total	3/15	16	6	1	9	401	369	+32

=== World Championship ===
Year	Position	GP	W	D	L	GS	GA	GD
(Socialist Federal Republic of Yugoslavia) 1957	6th	5	1	0	4	24	42	−18
(Romania) 1962	Did not qualify							
(West Germany) 1965	Did not qualify							
(Netherlands) 1971	Did not qualify							
(Socialist Federal Republic of Yugoslavia) 1973	Did not qualify							
(Soviet Union) 1975	Did not qualify							
(Czechoslovakia) 1978	Did not qualify							
(Hungary) 1982	Did not qualify							
(Netherlands) 1986	12th	7	1	0	6	133	155	−22
(South Korea) 1990	5th	5	3	0	2	101	111	−10
(Norway) 1993	8th	7	4	0	3	115	115	0
(Austria) (Hungary) 1995	8th	8	5	0	3	196	162	+34
(Germany) 1997	11th	6	3	0	3	150	139	+11
(Denmark) (Norway) 1999	3rd	9	7	0	2	245	223	+22
(Italy) 2001	7th	9	5	1	3	264	244	+20
(Croatia) 2003	11th	8	4	0	4	254	212	+42
(Russia) 2005	13th	5	3	0	2	158	147	+11
(France) 2007	16th	6	2	0	4	141	173	−32
(China) 2009	10th	9	3	0	6	273	241	+32
(Brazil) 2011	Did not qualify							
(Serbia) 2013	Did not qualify							
(Denmark) 2015	Did not qualify							
(Germany) 2017	Did not qualify							
(Japan) 2019	Did not qualify							
(Spain) 2021	16th	6	2	0	4	174	182	−8
(Denmark) (Norway) (Sweden) 2023	19th	6	2	0	4	180	200	−20
(Germany) (Netherlands) 2025	16th	6	2	0	4	150	168	−18
(Hungary) 2027	TBD							
(Spain) 2029	TBD							
(Czech Republic) (Poland) 2031	TBD							
Total	15/30	102	47	1	54	2558	2514	+44

=== European Championship ===
Year	Position	GP	W	D	L	GS	GA	GD
(Germany) 1994	9th	6	2	0	4	120	122	−2
(Denmark) 1996	3rd	7	5	0	2	175	150	+25
(Netherlands) 1998	4th	7	4	0	3	182	183	−1
(Romania) 2000	12th	6	0	0	6	111	179	−68
(Denmark) 2002	9th	6	3	0	3	159	150	+9
(Hungary) 2004	10th	6	2	0	4	164	170	−6
(Sweden) 2006	10th	6	2	0	4	153	200	−47
(North Macedonia) 2008	15th	3	0	0	3	53	86	−33
(Denmark) (Norway) 2010	Did not qualify							
(Serbia) 2012	Did not qualify							
(Hungary) (Croatia) 2014	Did not qualify							
(Sweden) 2016	Did not qualify							
(France) 2018	Did not qualify							
(Denmark) 2020	Did not qualify							
(Slovenia) (North Macedonia) (Montenegro) 2022	Did not qualify							
(Austria) (Hungary) (Switzerland) 2024	14th	3	1	0	2	85	87	−2
(Czech Republic) (Poland) (Romania) (Slovakia) (Turkey) 2026	Qualified							
(Denmark) (Sweden) (Norway) 2028	TBD							
(Belgium) (France) 2030	TBD							
(Denmark) (Germany) (Poland) 2032	TBD							
Total	10/20	50	19	0	31	1202	1327	−125

== Team ==
=== Current squad ===
The squad for the 2026 European Women's Handball Championship.

Head coach: Monique Tijsterman

No.	Pos.	Name	Date of birth (age)	Height	App.	Goals	Club
1	GK	Lena Ivančok	29 March 2001 (age 25)	1.75 m	73	3	(France) JDA Dijon Handball
3	LB	Katarina Pandza	17 April 2002 (age 24)	1.76 m	63	262	(Croatia) RK Podravka Koprivnica
8	LW	Leonie Neunteufel	4 January 2006 (age 20)	1.68 m	3	1	(Austria) MGA Fivers
10	RW	Lorena Baljak	24 October 2006 (age 20)	1.62 m	17	16	(Switzerland) LC Brühl Handball
13	LB	Martina Matičević	12 November 2006 (age 19)	1.80 m	11	15	(Austria) Hypo Niederösterreich
18	RB	Kristina Dramac	9 January 2002 (age 24)	1.80 m	63	93	(Germany) BSV Sachsen Zwickau
29	LB	Ines Ivančok-Šoltić	14 April 1998 (age 28)	1.80 m	98	366	(Hungary) Debreceni VSC
33	GK	Denise Kaufmann	31 October 2002 (age 24)	1.75 m	6	0	(Germany) BSV Sachsen Zwickau
44	P	Nora Leitner	5 May 2002 (age 24)	1.77 m	50	55	(Portugal) Benfica
46	P	Rebecca Rappitsch	26 February 2006 (age 20)	1.71 m	3	1	(Germany) SV Grün-Weiß Schwerin
54	LW	Santina Sabatnig	4 January 2004 (age 22)	1.74 m	55	59	(Germany) TuS Metzingen
64	CB	Ana Pandza	24 December 2003 (age 22)	1.71 m	55	74	(Croatia) RK Podravka Koprivnica
67	LB	Johanna Reichert	31 December 2001 (age 24)	1.78 m	60	170	(Romania) CS Gloria Bistrița
81	CB	Viktoria Marksteiner	5 November 2005 (age 21)	1.70 m	15	14	(Germany) SV Union Halle-Neustadt
89	LW	Eleonora Stankovic	27 October 2002 (age 24)	1.70 m	28	77	(Slovenia) RK Krim
97	RW	Philomena Egger	1 May 2007 (age 19)	1.77 m	23	70	(Slovenia) RK Krim

=== Technical staff ===
Position	Name
Head coach	(Netherlands) Monique Tijsterman
Assistant coach	(Austria) Erwin Gierlinger
Team Manager	(Austria) Isabel Mittmansgruber
Goalkeeping coach	(Austria) Andreas Wiese
Team Doctors	(Austria) Steven Moayad
Physiotherapists	(Austria) Sven Köhler
Physiotherapists	(Austria) Christina Nikolov-Pires

=== Notable players ===
Several Austrian players have seen their individual performance recognized at international tournaments.

MVP

- Ausra Fridrikas, 1999 World Championship

All-Star Team

- Marianna Racz, 1992 Summer Olympics
- Sorina Lefter, 1995 World Championship
- Ausra Fridrikas, 1999 World Championship, 2002 European Championship
- Tanja Logwin, 2004 European Championship

Top Scorer

- Ausra Fridrikas, 2001 World Championship (87 goals)
- Katrin Engel, 2009 World Championship (67 goals)

Others

- Tatyana Dzhandzhagava
- Barbara Strass
- Gabriela Rotiș
- Jasna Kolar-Merdan
- Stanka Božović
- Iris Morhammer
- Natascha Rusnachenko
- Laura Fritz
- Rima Sypkus
- Monika Königshofer
- Stephanie Ofenböck
- Stephanie Subke
- Simona Spiridon

=== Records ===
Still active players are highlighted.

Last updated: 5 February 2022
Source: Austrian Handball Federation

==== Most appearances ====
Rank	Name	Apps
1	Barbara Strass	272
2	Natascha Rusnachenko	255
3	Petra Blazek	238
4	Iris Morhammer	237
5	Karin Prokop	229
6	Stanka Božović	220
7	Katrin Engel	215
8	Stephanie Subke	200
9	Jadranka Jež	189
10	Susanne Unger	174

==== Top goalscorers ====
Rank	Name	Goals
1	Jasna Kolar-Merdan	1206
2	Ausra Fridrikas	1059
3	Stanka Božović	910
4	Katrin Engel	892
5	Tanja Logwin	820
6	Stephanie Subke	701
7	Iris Morhammer	663
8	Sonja Frey	573
9	Barbara Strass	570
10	Gabriele Neudolt	520
