= Ann Cathrin Eriksen =

Norwegian handball player (born 1971)

Personal information
- Nationality: Norwegian
- Born: 9 September 1971 (age 55) Bodø, Norway
- Height: 163 cm (64 in)

Sport
- Sport: Handball
- Position: Right wing

Senior clubs
- Years: Team
- -1989: IK Junkeren
- 1990-2001: Byåsen IL
National team
Years	Team	Apps	(Gls)
1989–2000	Norway	127	(119)
Medal record
Olympic Games
Bronze medal – third place	2000 Sydney	Team Competition
World Championship
Gold medal – first place	1999 Denmark/Norway	Team
European Championship
Gold medal – first place	1998 Netherlands	Team

Ann Cathrin Eriksen (born 9 September 1971) is a former Norwegian team handball player. She became European champion with the Norwegian team in 1998. This was the first time Norway won that title. A year later she won gold medals at the 1999 World Championship. She also received a bronze medal at the 2000 Summer Olympics in Sydney with the Norwegian national team. She played 127 matches for the national team during her career, and scored 119 goals.

At club level she played for IK Junkeren until 1989 before joining top league team Byåsen IL. Here she played until 2001, when she retired. With Byåsen she won the Norwegian Cup in 1991.
