= José Augusto Geraldino =

Dominican Republic judoka

Personal information
- Nationality: Dominican
- Born: 6 February 1971 (age 54)

Sport
- Sport: Judo

José Augusto Geraldino (born 6 February 1971) is a Dominican Republic judoka. He competed at the 1996 Summer Olympics and the 2000 Summer Olympics.
