= Christoph Sieber =

Austrian sailor

Personal information
- Nationality: Austrian
- Born: 9 January 1971 (age 55) Wels, Austria
- Height: 177 cm (5 ft 10 in)
- Weight: 68 kg (150 lb)

Sailing career
- Sport: Sailing
- Club: Union Yacht Club Wolfgangsee
Medal record
Sailing
Representing Austria
Olympic Games
Gold medal – first place	2000 Sydney	Mistral class

Christoph Sieber (born 9 January 1971, in Wels) is an Austrian sailor who competed in the 2000 Summer Olympics. He won a gold medal in the Mistral class.
