= Iris Morhammer =

Austrian handball player (born 1973)

Personal information
- Born: 28 April 1973 (age 53) Vienna, Austria

Sport
- Sport: Handball
- Position: Right wing
- Current club: Retired

Senior clubs
- Years: Team
- 1991–1997: Hypo Niederösterreich
- 1997–1998: Fyllingen (Bergen)
- 1998–2001: McDonald's Wr. Neustadt
National team
Years	Team	Apps	(Gls)
1991–2000	Austria	237	(663)
Medal record
Women's handball
Representing Austria
World Championship
Bronze medal – third place	1999 Norway/Denmark	Team
European Championship
Bronze medal – third place	1996 Denmark	Team

Iris Morhammer (born 28 April 1973 in Vienna) is a former Austrian international handballer who played as a right wing.

Morhammer was member of the Austrian national team that won the bronze medal both on the 1996 European Championship and the 1999 World Championship. She also participated on the Olympic Games in 1992 and in 2000, achieving two fifth places. She was capped 237 times and scored 663 goals.

She was included in the European Handball Federation Hall of Fame in 2023.
