= Sorina Teodorovic =

Austrian handball player (born 1970)

Personal information
- Born: 21 July 1970 (age 56) Bucharest, Romania
- Height: 1.82 m (6 ft 0 in)
- Weight: 74 kg (163 lb)

Sport
- Sport: Handball
- Position: Right back
- Current club: Retired

Youth career
- Years: Team
- –: CSȘ 2 București

Senior clubs
- Years: Team
- 1988–1993: Rapid București
- 1993–1996: Hypo Niederösterreich
- 1996–2002: Bækkelagets SK
- 2002–2003: Ferrobus KU Mislata
- –: SønderjyskE
- –: Fjellhammer IL
- 2007–2009: Toten HK
National team
Years	Team	Apps	(Gls)
–	Romania	118	(327)
1995–2000	Austria	130	(501)
Medal record
Women's handball
Representing Austria
World Championship
Bronze medal – third place	1999 Norway/Denmark	Team
European Championship
Bronze medal – third place	1996 Denmark	Team

Sorina Teodorovic (née Lefter; born 21 July 1970) is an Romanian born, Austrian handball player. She competed in the women's tournament at the 2000 Summer Olympics.

At the 1996 European Championship she won a bronze medal with Austria. Three years later she won another bronze medal at the 1999 World Women's Handball Championship. Those are two date (as of 2026) the only two medals Austria have ever won.
