= Rima Sypkus =

Austrian handball player (born 1967)

Personal information
- Born: 6 January 1967 (age 59) Vilnius, Lithuania
- Height: 1.85 m (6 ft 1 in)

Sport
- Sport: Handball
- Position: Line player

Senior clubs
- Years: Team
- 1988–1993: Eglė Vilnius
- 1993–2000: Hypo Niederösterreich
- 2000–2006: McDonald's Wiener Neustadt
National team
Years	Team	Apps	(Gls)
–	Austria	139	(403)
Medal record
European Championship
Bronze medal – third place	1996 Denmark
World Championship
Bronze medal – third place	1999 Denmark & Norway

Rima Sypkus (formerly Sipkuviene; born 5 January 1967) is a retired Lithuanian-born Austrian female handball player who played for the Austria national team. She competed in the women's tournament at the 2000 Summer Olympics.

At the 1996 European Championship she won a bronze medal with Austria. Three years later she won another bronze medal at the 1999 World Women's Handball Championship. Those are two date (as of 2026) the only two medals Austria have ever won.

== Honours ==
with Egle

- IHF Cup:
  - Winner: 1988

With Hypo

- EHF Champions League:
  - Gold Medalist: 1994, 1995, 1998, 2000
- Austrian Championship:
  - Winner: 1994, 1995, 1996, 1998, 1999, 2000
- Austrian Cup:
  - Winner: 1994, 1995, 1996, 1998, 1999, 2000

With Austria

- European Championship:
  - Bronze Medalist: 1996
- World Championship:
  - Bronze Medalist: 1999
