= Stanka Božović =

Austrian handball player (born 1962)

Stanka Božović (née Mugoša)
Personal information
- Nationality: Austrian, Montenegrin
- Born: 17 November 1962 (age 63) Titograd, PR Montenegro, FPR Yugoslavia
- Height: 178 cm (70 in)

Sport
- Sport: Handball
- Position: Right Back

Senior clubs
- Years: Team
- 1978-1986: ŽRK Budućnost
- 1986-1989: RK Olimpija
- 1989-2001: Hypo Niederösterreich
- 2001-2002: ESBF Besançon
National team
Years	Team	Apps	(Gls)
1990-2000	Austria	220	(910)
Medal record
European Championship
Bronze medal – third place	1996 Denmark
World Championship
Bronze medal – third place	1999 Denmark & Norway

Stanka Božović, née Mugoša (born 17 November 1962) in Titograd, is a former Yugoslav and Austrian handball player.

Stanka Mugoša was born in Podgorica, Yugoslavia (actually Montenegro). After playing for Budućnost Titograd and Belinka Olimpija Ljubljana, she went in 1989 to the Austrian handball club Hypo Niederösterreich where she played 13 years and won 7 times the EHF Champions League. She also played for ESBF Besançon (2001-2002), Verona (2002), Nit-Hak (Norway), Tulln, Landhaus and Stockerau.

In 1990, she started to play for Austrian national team. She competed at the 1992 Summer Olympics, where Austria placed 5th. At the 1996 European Championship she won a bronze medal with Austria. Three years later she won another bronze medal at the 1999 World Women's Handball Championship. Those are two date (as of 2026) the only two medals Austria have ever won. She also participated at the 2000 Summer Olympics, where Austria once again finished 5th. Her two participations at the Olympics, are Austria's best placement ever. She stopped playing for Austria in 2000 after 220 caps and 910 goals.

She's the mother of Austrian handballer Janko Božović.
