= Carmen Amariei =

Romanian handball player (born 1978)

Personal information
- Full name: Carmen Andreea Amariei
- Nationality: Romanian
- Born: 3 September 1978 (age 48) Cluj Napoca, Romania
- Height: 1.84 m (6 ft 0 in)

Sport
- Sport: Handball
- Position: Left Back
- Current club: Retired

Youth career
- Years: Team
- –: CSS Viitorul Cluj Napoca

Senior clubs
- Years: Team
- 1997–12/2000: Oltchim Râmnicu Vâlcea
- 12/2000–2004: ES Besançon
- 2004–2005: Randers HK
- 2005–2007: Slagelse DT
- 2007–2008: U Jolidon Cluj-Napoca
- 2008–2009: Rulmentul Braşov
- 2009–2010: FCK Handball
- 2010–2011: Viborg HK
- 2011–2012: Terom Iaşi
- 2013: SCM Craiova
National team
Years	Team	Apps	(Gls)
–	Romania	182	(855)
Medal record
Youth World Championship
Gold medal – first place	1995 Brazil	Team
Bronze medal – third place	1997 Ivory Coast	Team

Carmen Andreea Amariei (formerly Lungu; born 3 September 1978 in Cluj Napoca) was a Romanian handballer. She participated at the 2008 Summer Olympics in China, where the Romanian national team placed seventh.

She was inducted into the EHF Hall of Fame in 2024.

== Achievements ==
team:

- 2005 and 2007 winner of EHF Women's Champions League with Slagelse DT
- 2005 and 2007 winner of the Danish Women's Handball League with Slagelse DT
- 2001 and 2003 winner of the French Women's Handball Championship with ES Besançon
- 1998, 1999 and 2000 winner of Liga Naţională with Oltchim Râmnicu Vâlcea

individual:

- 2007 Best Right Back of the Danish Women's Handball League
- 1999 World Championship topscorer (67 goals in 9 matches)
- 2000 Romanian National League topscorer (178 goals)
- EHF Hall of Fame in 2024.
