= Mette Vestergaard =

Danish handball player (born 1975)

Personal information
- Full name: Mette Vestergaard Larsen
- Nationality: Danish
- Born: 27 November 1975 (age 50) Taastrup, Denmark
- Height: 172 cm (68 in)

Sport
- Sport: Handball
- Position: Right back

Youth career
- Years: Team
- 1982–1992: Rødovre HK

Senior clubs
- Years: Team
- 1992–1994: Rødovre HK
- 1994–2002: FIF Håndbold
- 2002–2006: FCK Håndbold
- 2006–2013: Lyngby HK
National team
Years	Team	Apps	(Gls)
1995–2005	Denmark	181	(519)
Medal record
Women's handball
Representing Denmark
Olympic Games
Gold medal – first place	2000 Sydney	Team competition
Gold medal – first place	2004 Athens	Team competition
European Championship
Gold medal – first place	1996 Denmark	Team competition
Gold medal – first place	2002 Denmark	Team competition
Silver medal – second place	1998 Netherlands	Team competition

Mette Vestergaard Larsen (born 27 November 1975) is a Danish former team handball player and coach. During her playing career she became two times Olympic champion. She received gold medals with the Danish national team at the 2000 Summer Olympics in Sydney and at the 2004 Summer Olympics in Athens.

At club level she never won a trophy, the closest being 2nd place in the Danish league in 1999/2000 with FIF. In the 1995–96 and 2000-01 season she was the topscorer in the Danish top league, Damehåndboldligaen.

Between 2015 and 2020 she was part of the staff around the Danish Women's National Team.

She was included in the European Handball Federation Hall of Fame in 2023.
