= Nataliya Rusnachenko =

Austrian handball player (born 1969)

Personal information
- Nationality: Ukrainian/Austrian
- Born: 13 May 1969 (age 57) Tiraspol, Moldavian Soviet Socialist Republic
- Height: 1.87 m (6 ft 2 in)

Sport
- Sport: Handball
- Position: goalkeeper

Senior clubs
- Years: Team
- –: (Soviet Union) HC Spartak Kyiv
- 1998–1999: (Austria) WAT Fünfhaus
- 1999–2001: (Austria) Hypo Niederösterreich
- 2002–2007: (Austria) McDonald's Wiener Neustadt
- 2007–2013: (Austria) Hypo Niederösterreich
National team
Years	Team	Apps	(Gls)
–	Soviet Union	100	(0)
–	Austria	252	(100)
Medal record
Women's Handball
Representing the Soviet Union
Bronze medal – third place	1988 Seoul	Team

Nataliya Rusnachenko (Ukrainian: Наталія Русначенко, born 13 May 1969) is a Ukrainian-Austrian former handball player who competed for the Soviet Union in the 1988 Summer Olympics and for Austria in the 1992 Summer Olympics and in the 2000 Summer Olympics.

== Career ==
She was born in Tiraspol, Moldavian Soviet Socialist Republic. She represented the Moldavian SSR at the 1986 Spartakiad in Kiev and played for Spartak Kyiv.

In 1988 she won the bronze medal with the Soviet team. She played one match as goalkeeper.

Four years later she was a member of the Austria team which finished fifth in the 1992 Olympic tournament. She played three matches as goalkeeper.

At the 2000 Games she finished fifth with the Austrian team in the Olympic tournament. She played all seven matches as goalkeeper.

== Private ==
She has two sons, one of which, Michael Miskovez, is also a handball player.
