= Kristine Andersen =

Danish handball player (born 1976)

Personal information
- Full name: Kristine Frøsig-Andersen
- Nationality: Danish
- Born: 2 April 1976 (age 50) Aalborg, Denmark
- Height: 172 cm (68 in)

Sport
- Sport: Handball
- Position: Playmaker

Youth career
- Years: Team
- –: Sindal

Senior clubs
- Years: Team
- 1993–1996: Ikast fS
- 1996–1997: Bayer 04 Leverkusen
- 1997–2006: Ikast fS
- 2006–2007: SK Aarhus
National team
Years	Team	Apps	(Gls)
1996–2004	Denmark	106	(305)
Medal record
Women's handball
Representing Denmark
Olympic Games
Gold medal – first place	1996 Atlanta	Team competition
Gold medal – first place	2004 Athens	Team competition
European Championship
Gold medal – first place	1996 Denmark
Gold medal – first place	2002 Denmark
Silver medal – second place	1998 Netherlands

Kristine Andersen (born 2 April 1976) is a Danish former team handball player and two times Olympic champion. She won a gold medal with the Danish national team at the 1996 Summer Olympics in Atlanta, and again eight years later at the 2004 Summer Olympics in Athens.

== National team ==
Kristine Andersen debuted on 20 February 1996. At her first Olympics in 1996 she was not a part of the initial planned team, and was only included due to injury. As the only Danish player, she did not play a single match. When Denmark later the same year won the 1996 European Women's Handball Championship, she was a more established part of the team.

She missed the 2000 Olympics in Sydney, Australia due to injury. After her return, was her breakthrough to become a stable part of the national setup. When the Danish golden generation of the 1990's began to retire, Andersen saw more playing time. At the 2002 European Championship where Denmark won the tournament for the third time, Andersen was a key figure for the national team.

She retired from the national team after Denmark won the 2004 Olympics in Athens, Greece; the third straight Danish gold medal.

== Club career ==
Kristine Andersen started playing handball at Sindal before moving to Ikast fS. Here she played most of her career, with the exception of a single season at the German club Bayer 04 Leverkusen.

For many years Kristine Andersen was the first choice playmaker for Ikast fS. Here she won the Danish league, the EHF Cup and the EHF Cup Winners' Cup. In the 1993-94 edition of the Danish Handball Cup she was named the MVP. Despite that she and Ikast FS lost the final to Viborg HK.

She officially retired in June 2005 to focus on her civil career as a sales coordinator, partly because she and the club could not agree on salary terms. But returned to Ikast-Bording the following autumn during an injury crisis at the club. In September 2006 she returned to professional handball when she signed a one-season contract with the Danish club SK Aarhus, and after that ran out, she retired.
