= Tine Lindemann =

German handball player (born 1970)

Personal information
- Full name: Christine Lindemann
- Nationality: German
- Born: 8 September 1970 (age 56) Stadthagen, West Germany
- Height: 188 cm (74 in)

Sport
- Sport: Handball
- Position: Goalkeeper

Youth career
- Years: Team
- 1980-1986: SV Munster
- 1986-1988: Eintracht Lüneburg

Senior clubs
- Years: Team
- 1988-1990: Eintracht Lüneburg
- 1990-1996: TuS Walle Bremen
- 1996-1997: Stabæk IF
- 1997-1999: Buxtehuder SV
- 1999-2004: Randers HK
- 2004-2009: KIF Kolding
- 2021: HL Buchholz 08-Rosengarten
National team
Years	Team	Apps	(Gls)
1994-	Germany	147	(0)

Teams managed
- 2017-2024: HL Buchholz 08-Rosengarten (gk coach)

Christine „Tine“ Lindemann (born 8 September 1970) is a German former handball player (goalkeeper). She competed in the women's tournament at the 1996 Summer Olympics.

After her playing career she has worked as goalkeeping coach at HL Buchholz 08-Rosengarten.
