= Tonje Kjærgaard =

Danish handball player (born 1975)

Personal information
- Full name: Tonje Kjærgaard Jensen
- Nationality: Danish
- Born: 11 June 1975 (age 51) Silkeborg, Denmark
- Height: 1.70 m (5 ft 7 in)

Sport
- Sport: Handball
- Position: Line Player

Youth career
- Years: Team
- 1991–1992: Silkeborg-Voel KFUM

Senior clubs
- Years: Team
- 1992–2004: Ikast fS
National team
Years	Team	Apps	(Gls)
1994-2000	Denmark	139	(342)
Medal record
Women's handball
Representing Denmark
Olympic Games
Gold medal – first place	1996 Atlanta	Team
Gold medal – first place	2000 Sydney	Team
World Championship
Silver medal – second place	1993 Norway
Bronze medal – third place	1995 Austria/Hungary	Team
Gold medal – first place	1997 Germany	Team
European Championship
Gold medal – first place	1994 Germany	Team
Gold medal – first place	1996 Denmark	Team
Silver medal – second place	1998 Netherlands	Team

Tonje Kjærgaard (born 11 June 1975) is a Danish former team handball player, World champion, two times European champion and two times Olympic champion. She won a gold medal with the Danish national team at the 1996 Summer Olympics in Atlanta. Four years later she won a gold medal with the Danish national team at the 2000 Summer Olympics in Sydney. She also won the 1997 World Cup in Germany, the first ever World Championship title for Denmark.

== National team ==
Kjærgaard debuted on the Danish national team at only 18 years old. After the gold medal in Sydney, she retired from the national team, aged only 25. At that point, she had competed in 8 major international tournaments.

== Club career ==
Kjærgaard played her entire senior career at Ikast fS and is considered an icon for the club. She played her first match at the club at the age of 17. She was part of 1997/1998 team to win the first Danish League in the club's history. For a period she captained the team, and to this day her shirt number (no. 3) is taken out of use. She also won the Danish Cup three times with the club back-to-back-to-back between 1999 and 2001. In 2002 she won the EHF European League with the team.

== Post-playing career ==
In 2021 she entered the club board.

Today she is a high school teacher in Ikast.
