= Anette Hoffmann =

Danish handball player (born 1971)

Personal information
- Full name: Anette Hoffmann-Møberg
- Nationality: Danish
- Born: 5 May 1971 (age 55) Egvad, Denmark
- Height: 1.75 m (5 ft 9 in)

Sport
- Sport: Handball
- Position: Left Wing

Senior clubs
- Years: Team
- 1988–1989: KIF Kolding
- 1990–1997: Viborg HK
- 1997–1998: Corteblanco Bidebieta
- 1998–2002: KIF Kolding
National team
| Years | Team | Apps | (Gls) |
| 1990-2000 | Denmark | 183 | (641) |
Medal record
Olympic Games
| Gold medal – first place | 1996 Atlanta | Team |
| Gold medal – first place | 2000 Sydney | Team |
World Championship
| Gold medal – first place | 1997 Germany | Team |
| Silver medal – second place | 1993 Norway | Team |
| Bronze medal – third place | 1995 Austria/Hungary | Team |
European Championship
| Gold medal – first place | 1994 Germany | Team |
| Gold medal – first place | 1996 Denmark | Team |
| Silver medal – second place | 1998 Netherlands | Team |

Anette Hoffmann (born 5 May 1971) is a Danish former team handball player, two times Olympic champion and a World champion. She won a gold medal with the Danish national team at the 1996 Summer Olympics in Atlanta. Four years later she won a gold medal with the Danish national team at the 2000 Summer Olympics in Sydney. With 183 matches she is the 6th most capped player on the Danish Women's National Team. She also has the record for the most goals in a single match for the Danish women's national team, when she scored 19 goals against Estonia in 1991.

In the 1992-93 edition of the Danish Handball Cup she was named the MVP, when she won the title with Viborg HK. In 1994 she won the EHF Cup with Viborg, and in 1997 she was part of the Viborg team that reached the final of the 1997 Champions League, where they lost to Spanish Mar Valencia.

Anette is a mother to a son Philipp and a daughter Carolin, whom currently plays field hockey at Syracuse University.
