= Gitte Sunesen =

Danish handball player (born 1971)

Personal information
- Full name: Gitte Jensby Sunesen Vilhelmsen
- Nationality: Danish
- Born: 11 December 1971 (age 54) Hammel, Denmark
- Height: 1.80 m (5 ft 11 in)

Sport
- Sport: Handball
- Position: Goalkeeper

Senior clubs
- Years: Team
- 1989–2004: GOG Svendborg TGI
National team
Years	Team	Apps	(Gls)
1991–2000	Denmark	135	(1)

Teams managed
- 2015–2016: Odense Håndbold (goalkeeping coach)
- 2017–2019: Odense Håndbold (goalkeeping coach)
- 2021–: Odense Håndbold (goalkeeping coach)
Medal record
Women's handball
Representing Denmark
Olympic Games
Gold medal – first place	1996 Atlanta	Team
World championships
Gold medal – first place	1997 Germany	Team
Bronze medal – third place	1995 Austria/Hungary	Team
European Championship
Gold medal – first place	1994 Germany	Team
Gold medal – first place	1996 Denmark	Team
Silver medal – second place	1998 Netherlands	Team

Gitte Jensby Sunesen Vilhelmsen (born 11 December 1971) is a Danish former team handball player, Olympic champion and World champion. She received a gold medal with the Danish national team at the 1996 Summer Olympics in Atlanta. Additionally, She is a two times European Champion; from 1994 and 1996 and World champion from 1997.

== Club career ==
Sunesen played her entire career at Danish club GOG Håndbold. During her career she won the Danish league three times and the Danish Women's Handball Cup two times. She debuted for the Danish national team in 1991 at the age of 21.

She missed the 2000 Olympics due to a knee injury suffered a month prior to the tournament in a friendly match against Norway. She retired from playing handball in 2003 due to knee injuries. In 2015 she was hired as goalkeeping coach at Odense Håndbold.

== Private life ==
During the last few years of her playing career as well as after her retirement she has worked as a primary school teacher. She is married to fellow handball player Keld Vilhelmsen. Her child Lasse Vilhelmsen is also a handball player.
