= Tatyana Dzhandzhgava =

Kazakhstani-Austrian handball player (born 1964)

Personal information
- Full name: Tatyana Vasilievna Dshandshgava
- Born: 25 February 1964 (age 62) Atbasar, Kazakh SSR, Soviet Union
- Height: 1.80 m (5 ft 11 in)
- Weight: 66 kg (146 lb)

Sport
- Sport: Handball
- Position: Goalkeeper
- Current club: Retired

Senior clubs
- Years: Team
- 1981–1990: Kuban Krasnodar
- 1991–1992: ŽRK Budućnost Podgorica
- 1992–2001: Hypo Niederösterreich
National team
Years	Team	Apps	(Gls)
1982–1991	Soviet Union	200	(0)
1992	Unified Team	5	(0)
–	Russia		
1996–2000	Austria	127	(1)

Teams managed
- 2006–?: TV 05 Mainzlar
Medal record
Women's handball
Representing Soviet Union
Olympic Games
Bronze medal – third place	1988 Seoul	Team
World Championship
Gold medal – first place	1982 Hungary	Team
Gold medal – first place	1986 Netherlands	Team
Representing Unified Team
Olympic Games
Bronze medal – third place	1992 Barcelona	Team
Representing Austria
World Championship
Bronze medal – third place	1999 Norway/Denmark	Team
European Championship
Bronze medal – third place	1996 Denmark	Team

Tatyana Vasilievna Dshandshgava, née Shalimova (Russian: Татьяна Васильевна Джанджгава, née Шалимова, German: Tatjana Dschandschgawa, born February 25, 1964 in Atbasar) is a Kazakhstani-Russian born, Austrian former handball player (goalkeeper). She played for first the Soviet Union national team, then the Russian national team and lastly the Austrian national team. She is a World champion from 1982 and 1986.

== Club handball ==
Dshandshgava played for HC Kuban Krasnodar until 1990. Here she won the Soviet Championship in 1989 and the EHF Cup Winners' Cup in 1987 and 1988.

She then joined ŽRK Budućnost Podgorica in Montenegro. In her only season at the club she won the Yugoslav Championship.

She then moved to Austria and joined Hypo Niederösterreich, where she won the Austrian Championship and Cup every season from 1993 to 2001. She also won the EHF Women's Champions League in 1994, 1995, 1998 and 2000, which is the joint third most of any women's player.

After her playing days she has become a goalkeeping coach.

== National team ==
=== Soviet Union ===
She made her debut for the Soviet Union national team in 1982. Later the same year she won a gold medal at the 1982 World Women's Handball Championship.

Four years later she won a 2nd gold medal in a row at the 1986 World Women's Handball Championship.

She then competed for the Soviet Union in the 1988 Summer Olympics. In 1988 she won the bronze medal with the Soviet team. She played all five matches as goalkeeper.

Four years later, she played for the Unified Team in the 1992 Summer Olympics, where she won the bronze medal. She played all five matches as goalkeeper.

=== Austria ===
She later optained Austrian citizenship, and switched to playing for Austria in 1996. At the 1996 European Championship she won a bronze medal with Austria. Three years later she won another bronze medal at the 1999 World Women's Handball Championship. Those are two date (as of 2026) the only two medals Austria have ever won.

A year later she represented Austria in the 2000 Summer Olympics. At the 2000 Games she finished fifth with the Austrian team in the Olympic tournament. She played five matches and scored one goal as goalkeeper. Together with 1992, this is Austria's best ever result at the Olympics.
