= Natalia Gontcharova (handballer) =

Russian handball player

Personal information
- Full name: Natalia Leonidovna Gontcharova
- Nationality: Russian
- Born: 24 February 1972 (age 54) Rostov-Don, Soviet Union
- Height: 1.72 m (5 ft 8 in)

Sport
- Sport: Handball
- Position: Left back

Youth career
- Years: Team
- –1991: Rostov-Don

Senior clubs
- Years: Team
- –: Rostov-Don
- –: HC Lada
- 2004–2005: HC Motor Zaporizhzhia
- 2006–2007: HC Karpaty Uzhhorod
National team
- Years: Team
- –: Russia
Medal record
World Championship
Gold medal – first place	Italy 2001	National Team
European Championship
Bronze medal – third place	Romania 2000	National Team

Natalia Leonidovna Gontcharova (Russian: Наталья Леонидовна Гончарова, born 24 February 1972) is a former Russian handball player, who won the World Championship in 2001.

== Career ==
Gontcharova started her career at Rostov-Don, before joining HC Lada. In 2004 she joined HC Motor Zaporizhzhia followed by HC Karpaty Uzhhorod in Ukraine.

In 2000 she won a bronze medal at the 2000 European Women's Handball Championship. A year later she was part of the Russian team that won the 2001 World Women's Handball Championship, Russia's first title.
