= Laura Fritz (handballer) =

Austrian handball player (born 1978)

Personal information
- Nationality: Austrian
- Born: 2 August 1978 (age 47) Graz, Austria

Sport
- Sport: Handball

Laura Fritz (born 2 August 1978) is an Austrian handball player. She competed in the women's tournament at the 2000 Summer Olympics.
