= 1995 World Women's Handball Championship =

1995 edition of the World Women's Handball Championship

Tournament details
- Host countries: Austria; Hungary
- Venues: 7 (in 7 host cities)
- Dates: 5–17 December 1995
- Teams: 20 (from 5 confederations)

Final positions
- Champions: South Korea (1st title)
- Runners-up: Hungary
- Third place: Denmark

Tournament statistics
- Matches played: 72
- Goals scored: 3,299 (45.82 per match)
- Top scorer(s): (Ukraine) Natalja Derepasko (61 goals)

The 1995 World Women's Handball Championship was the 12th edition of the World Championship. It took place in Austria and Hungary 5–17 December 1995. It was the only to have 20 teams and the first to have multiple hosts. South Korea won its first title in Vienna.

== Group stage ==
=== Group A ===
Pos	Team	Pld	W	D	L	GF	GA	GD	Pts	Qualification
1	Austria	4	4	0	0	109	74	+35	8	Round of 16
2	Norway	4	3	0	1	107	64	+43	6	Round of 16
3	Sweden	4	2	0	2	90	79	+11	4	Round of 16
4	Japan	4	0	1	3	66	103	−37	1	Cross matches
5	Ivory Coast	4	0	1	3	53	105	−52	1	

5 December 1995; 18:00	Norway	26–18	Japan	Krems
5 December 1995; 18:00		(12–8)		Krems

5 December 1995; 19:30	Austria	29–13	Ivory Coast	Wiener Neustadt
5 December 1995; 19:30		(10–8)		Wiener Neustadt

6 December 1995; 18:00	Sweden	27–14	Japan	Sankt Pölten
6 December 1995; 18:00		(13–5)		Sankt Pölten

6 December 1995; 20:00	Norway	32–7	Ivory Coast	Sankt Pölten
6 December 1995; 20:00		(13–4)		Sankt Pölten

7 December 1995; 19:30	Austria	24–22	Sweden	Wiener Neustadt
7 December 1995; 19:30		(13–9)		Wiener Neustadt

8 December 1995; 17:30	Japan	18–18	Ivory Coast	Wiener Neustadt
8 December 1995; 17:30		(11–8)		Wiener Neustadt

8 December 1995; 19:30	Austria	24–23	Norway	Wiener Neustadt
8 December 1995; 19:30		(11–13)		Wiener Neustadt

9 December 1995; 20:00	Norway	26–15	Sweden	Krems
9 December 1995; 20:00		(15–7)		Krems

10 December 1995; 13:00	Sweden	26–15	Ivory Coast	Wiener Neustadt
10 December 1995; 13:00		(13–6)		Wiener Neustadt

10 December 1995; 15:00	Austria	32–16	Japan	Wiener Neustadt
10 December 1995; 15:00		(17–4)		Wiener Neustadt

=== Group B ===
Pos	Team	Pld	W	D	L	GF	GA	GD	Pts	Qualification
1	Romania	4	4	0	0	124	81	+43	8	Round of 16
2	Denmark	4	3	0	1	116	78	+38	6	Round of 16
3	Slovakia	4	1	1	2	92	95	−3	3	Round of 16
4	Czech Republic	4	1	1	2	83	86	−3	3	Cross matches
5	Canada	4	0	0	4	61	136	−75	0	

5 December 1995; 16:30	Romania	27–22	Slovakia	Wiener Neustadt
5 December 1995; 16:30		(16–8)		Wiener Neustadt

5 December 1995; 20:00	Denmark	37–18	Canada	Krems
5 December 1995; 20:00		(19–7)		Krems

6 December 1995; 18:00	Czech Republic	27–11	Canada	Stockerau
6 December 1995; 18:00		(15–3)		Stockerau

6 December 1995; 20:00	Denmark	26–17	Slovakia	Stockerau
6 December 1995; 20:00		(11–6)		Stockerau

7 December 1995; 17:30	Romania	25–18	Czech Republic	Wiener Neustadt
7 December 1995; 17:30		(12–11)		Wiener Neustadt

8 December 1995; 19:00	Romania	29–27	Denmark	Sankt Pölten
8 December 1995; 19:00		(16–14)		Sankt Pölten

8 December 1995; 17:00	Slovakia	29–18	Canada	Sankt Pölten
8 December 1995; 17:00		(14–12)		Sankt Pölten

9 December 1995; 18:00	Denmark	26–14	Czech Republic	Krems
9 December 1995; 18:00		(11–5)		Krems

10 December 1995; 18:00	Romania	43–14	Canada	Stockerau
10 December 1995; 18:00		(18–8)		Stockerau

10 December 1995; 20:00	Slovakia	24–24	Czech Republic	Stockerau
10 December 1995; 20:00		(11–11)		Stockerau

=== Group C ===
Pos	Team	Pld	W	D	L	GF	GA	GD	Pts	Qualification
1	South Korea	4	4	0	0	114	78	+36	8	Round of 16
2	Russia	4	2	1	1	95	74	+21	5	Round of 16
3	Germany	4	2	1	1	97	84	+13	5	Round of 16
4	China	4	1	0	3	90	112	−22	2	Cross matches
5	Angola	4	0	0	4	76	124	−48	0	Cross matches

5 December 1995; 17:30	Germany	30–19	Angola	Győr
5 December 1995; 17:30		(17–10)		Győr

5 December 1995; 19:30	South Korea	24–20	Russia	Győr
5 December 1995; 19:30		(12–13)		Győr

6 December 1995; 17:00	Germany	29–23	China	Győr
6 December 1995; 17:00		(14–12)		Győr

6 December 1995; 15:00	Russia	26–17	Angola	Győr
6 December 1995; 15:00		(17–6)		Győr

7 December 1995; 17:00	South Korea	32–18	China	Győr
7 December 1995; 17:00		(13–7)		Győr

8 December 1995; 15:00	South Korea	34–20	Angola	Győr
8 December 1995; 15:00		(19–7)		Győr

8 December 1995; 17:00	Russia	18–18	Germany	Győr
8 December 1995; 17:00		(10–6)		Győr

9 December 1995; 17:00	China	34–20	Angola	Győr
9 December 1995; 17:00		(15–9)		Győr

10 December 1995; 16:00	Russia	31–15	China	Győr
10 December 1995; 16:00		(18–7)		Győr

10 December 1995; 18:00	South Korea	24–20	Germany	Győr
10 December 1995; 18:00		(11–9)		Győr

=== Group D ===
Pos	Team	Pld	W	D	L	GF	GA	GD	Pts	Qualification
1	Hungary	4	4	0	0	110	69	+41	8	Round of 16
2	Croatia	4	3	0	1	78	61	+17	6	Round of 16
3	Ukraine	4	2	0	2	93	80	+13	4	Round of 16
4	United States	4	1	0	3	72	97	−25	2	
5	Brazil	4	0	0	4	63	109	−46	0	

5 December 1995; 16:30	Croatia	21–15	United States	Budapest
5 December 1995; 16:30		(10–3)		Budapest

5 December 1995; 19:30	Hungary	30–23	Ukraine	Budapest
5 December 1995; 19:30		(12–11)		Budapest

6 December 1995; 17:00	Croatia	17–16	Ukraine	Budapest
6 December 1995; 17:00		(8–8)		Budapest

6 December 1995; 19:00	Hungary	33–14	Brazil	Budapest
6 December 1995; 19:00		(16–7)		Budapest

7 December 1995; 17:00	United States	24–19	Brazil	Budapest
7 December 1995; 17:00		(13–7)		Budapest

8 December 1995; 17:00	Ukraine	27–16	United States	Budapest
8 December 1995; 17:00		(13–6)		Budapest

8 December 1995; 19:00	Hungary	17–15	Croatia	Budapest
8 December 1995; 19:00		(11–5)		Budapest

9 December 1995; 17:00	Ukraine	27–17	Brazil	Budapest
9 December 1995; 17:00		(12–9)		Budapest

10 December 1995; 17:00	Croatia	25–13	Brazil	Budapest
10 December 1995; 17:00		(14–5)		Budapest

10 December 1995; 19:00	Hungary	30–17	United States	Budapest
10 December 1995; 19:00		(12–7)		Budapest

== Cross matches ==
The 4th and 5th place from A met 5th and 4th from B and the same for group C and D. The winner of each match got a place in the round of 16.

Date ?? December; Time ??	Japan	31–22	Canada	Place ??
Date ?? December; Time ??		(15–9)		Place ??

Date ?? December; Time ??	Czech Republic	24–14	Ivory Coast	Place ??
Date ?? December; Time ??		(11–9)		Place ??

Date ?? December; Time ??	China	30–16	Brazil	Place ??
Date ?? December; Time ??		(14–7)		Place ??

Date ?? December; Time ??	United States	23–24	Angola	Place ??
Date ?? December; Time ??		(8–12)		Place ??

== Knockout stage ==
Round of 16
12 December
Austria	21
Czech Republic	16
12 December
Sweden	20
Denmark	25
12 December
South Korea	27
Angola	14
12 December
Germany	28
Croatia	24
12 December
Slovakia	21
Norway	32
12 December
Romania	33
Japan	17
12 December
Ukraine	20
Russia	23
12 December
Hungary	21
China	20

Quarterfinals
14 December
Austria	23
Denmark	24
14 December
South Korea	20
Germany	15
14 December
Norway	21
Romania	19
14 December
Russia	18
Hungary	23

Semifinals
15 December
Denmark	31
South Korea	33
15 December
Hungary	22
Norway	21

Final
17 December
South Korea	25
Hungary	20
Third place
17 December
Norway	24
Denmark	25

=== Round of 16 ===
12 December 1995; 17:30	Norway	32–21	Slovakia	Wiener Neustadt
12 December 1995; 17:30		(18–11)		Wiener Neustadt

== Placement 5–12 ==
Losers from round of 16 played for placements from 9 to 12. Losers from quarterfinals played for places 5 to 8. There was no play for lower rankings.

=== 9–12 ===
1st round
?? December
Slovakia	23
Japan	21
?? December
Angola	23
Croatia	24
?? December
Czech Republic	18
Sweden	20
?? December
Ukraine	31
China	30

Second round
?? December
Slovakia	28
Croatia	30
?? December
Sweden	19
Ukraine	24

Placements
17 December
Croatia	32
Ukraine	35
11th
17 December
Sweden	26
Slovakia	20

=== 5–8 ===
1st round
?? December
Romania	28
Russia	29
?? December
Germany	20
Austria	16

Placements
17 December
Russia	22
Germany	26
7th
17 December
Austria	27
Romania	28

== Final standings ==
#	Team
	South Korea
	Hungary
	Denmark
4.	Norway
5.	Germany
6.	Russia
7.	Romania
8.	Austria
9.	Ukraine
10.	Croatia
11.	Sweden
12.	Slovakia
13.	Czech Republic
13.	China
13.	Japan
13.	Angola
17.	United States
17.	Ivory Coast
17.	Brazil
17.	Canada

== All Star Team ==
- Goalkeeper: Cecilie Leganger Norway
- Left Wing: Anette Hoffmann Denmark
- Left Back: Lim O-kyeong South Korea
- Center Back: Mariana Tîrcă Romania
- Pivot: Natalia Deriougina Russia
- Right Back: Sorina Lefter Austria
- Right Wing: Katalin Szilágyi Hungary
