= 1999 World Women's Handball Championship =

1999 edition of the World Women's Handball Championship

Tournament details
- Host countries: Denmark; Norway
- Dates: November 29 – December 12
- Teams: 24 (from 5 confederations)

Final positions
- Champions: Norway (1st title)
- Runners-up: France
- Third place: Austria
- Fourth place: Romania

Tournament statistics
- Matches played: 80
- Goals scored: 3,980 (49.75 per match)
- Top scorer(s): (Germany) Grit Jurack (Romania) Carmen Amariei-Lungu

Awards
- Best player: (Austria) Ausra Fridrikas

The 1999 World Women's Handball Championship, the 14th of its kind, was held between November 29 and December 12, 1999, and was jointly hosted by Denmark and Norway, with the finals being played in Lillehammer, Norway.

Norway won their first ever World Cup title.

== Group stage ==
=== Group A ===
Pos	Team	Pld	W	D	L	GF	GA	GD	Pts	Qualification
1	Netherlands	5	4	0	1	124	101	+23	8	Round of 16
2	Norway	5	4	0	1	137	88	+49	8	Round of 16
3	Poland	5	3	1	1	126	114	+12	7	Round of 16
4	Belarus	5	2	1	2	127	123	+4	5	Round of 16
5	Czech Republic	5	1	0	4	124	121	+3	2	
6	Australia	5	0	0	5	75	166	−91	0	

29 November; 16:30	Poland	29–19	Australia	Oslo, Norway; Attendance: 600; Referees: Chung, Lim (KOR)
29 November; 16:30		(16–9)		Oslo, Norway; Attendance: 600; Referees: Chung, Lim (KOR)

29 November; 18:00	Norway	29–13	Belarus	Oslo, Norway; Attendance: 6400; Referees: Gallego, Lamas (ESP)
29 November; 18:00		(13–9)		Oslo, Norway; Attendance: 6400; Referees: Gallego, Lamas (ESP)

29 November; 21:00	Netherlands	25–21	Czech Republic	Oslo, Norway; Attendance: 793; Referees: Kalin, Korič (SLO)
29 November; 21:00		(15–11)		Oslo, Norway; Attendance: 793; Referees: Kalin, Korič (SLO)

30 November; 17:00	Belarus	29–29	Poland	Gjøvik, Norway; Referees: Kalin, Korič (SLO)
30 November; 17:00		(15–14)		Gjøvik, Norway; Referees: Kalin, Korič (SLO)

30 November; 19:00	Czech Republic	21–30	Norway	Gjøvik, Norway; Attendance: 2,700; Referees: Ehrmann, Künzig (GER)
30 November; 19:00		(10–13)		Gjøvik, Norway; Attendance: 2,700; Referees: Ehrmann, Künzig (GER)

30 November; 21:00	Australia	16–26	Netherlands	Gjøvik, Norway; Attendance: 300; Referees: Gallego, Lamas (ESP)
30 November; 21:00		(9–14)		Gjøvik, Norway; Attendance: 300; Referees: Gallego, Lamas (ESP)

2 December; 17:00	Belarus	24–22	Czech Republic	Hamar, Norway; Attendance: 800; Referees: Gallego, Lamas (ESP)
2 December; 17:00		(13–7)		Hamar, Norway; Attendance: 800; Referees: Gallego, Lamas (ESP)

2 December; 19:00	Norway	38–11	Australia	Hamar, Norway; Attendance: 3,220; Referees: Ehrmann, Künzig (GER)
2 December; 19:00		(17–5)		Hamar, Norway; Attendance: 3,220; Referees: Ehrmann, Künzig (GER)

2 December; 21:00	Poland	22–20	Netherlands	Hamar, Norway; Attendance: 500; Referees: Chong, Lim (KOR)
2 December; 21:00		(8–11)		Hamar, Norway; Attendance: 500; Referees: Chong, Lim (KOR)

4 December; 13:00	Australia	14–37	Belarus	Stavanger, Norway; Attendance: 500; Referees: Chong, Lim (KOR)
4 December; 13:00		(7–19)		Stavanger, Norway; Attendance: 500; Referees: Chong, Lim (KOR)

4 December; 16:00	Poland	27–24	Czech Republic	Stavanger, Norway; Attendance: 1,250; Referees: Ehrmann, Künzig (GER)
4 December; 16:00		(13–13)		Stavanger, Norway; Attendance: 1,250; Referees: Ehrmann, Künzig (GER)

4 December; 17:00	Netherlands	24–18	Norway	Stavanger, Norway; Attendance: 4,000; Referees: Kalin, Korič (SLO)
4 December; 17:00		(12–9)		Stavanger, Norway; Attendance: 4,000; Referees: Kalin, Korič (SLO)

5 December; 14:00	Czech Republic	36–15	Australia	Stavanger, Norway; Attendance: 650; Referees: Besses, Benmila (ALG)
5 December; 14:00		(18–7)		Stavanger, Norway; Attendance: 650; Referees: Besses, Benmila (ALG)

5 December; 15:00	Netherlands	29–24	Belarus	Stavanger, Norway; Attendance: 2,160; Referees: Ehrmann, Künzig (GER)
5 December; 15:00		(13–13)		Stavanger, Norway; Attendance: 2,160; Referees: Ehrmann, Künzig (GER)

4 December; 18:00	Norway	22–19	Poland	Stavanger, Norway; Attendance: 4,682; Referees: Gallego, Lamas (ESP)
4 December; 18:00		(12–9)		Stavanger, Norway; Attendance: 4,682; Referees: Gallego, Lamas (ESP)

=== Group B ===
Pos	Team	Pld	W	D	L	GF	GA	GD	Pts	Qualification
1	Austria	5	4	0	1	144	125	+19	8	Round of 16
2	France	5	4	0	1	124	98	+26	8	Round of 16
3	Ukraine	5	3	0	2	138	109	+29	6	Round of 16
4	Romania	5	3	0	2	146	110	+36	6	Round of 16
5	Ivory Coast	5	1	0	4	110	142	−32	2	
6	Cuba	5	0	0	5	103	181	−78	0	

30 November; 13:30	Austria	26–25	Ukraine	Trondheim, Norway; Attendance: 520; Referees: Klucso, Lekrinzki (HUN)
30 November; 13:30		(11–12)		Trondheim, Norway; Attendance: 520; Referees: Klucso, Lekrinzki (HUN)

30 November; 15:15	Romania	37–19	Cuba	Trondheim, Norway; Attendance: 510; Referees: Marjan Nachevski, Dragan Nachevski (MKD)
30 November; 15:15		(19–7)		Trondheim, Norway; Attendance: 510; Referees: Marjan Nachevski, Dragan Nachevski (MKD)

30 November; 17:00	France	31–19	Ivory Coast	Trondheim, Norway; Attendance: 740; Referees: Malik de Tchara, Al Lail (ARG)
30 November; 17:00		(14–10)		Trondheim, Norway; Attendance: 740; Referees: Malik de Tchara, Al Lail (ARG)

1 December; 14:30	Ivory Coast	15–33	Romania	Trondheim, Norway; Attendance: 688; Referees: Klucso, Lekrinzki (HUN)
1 December; 14:30		(5–18)		Trondheim, Norway; Attendance: 688; Referees: Klucso, Lekrinzki (HUN)

1 December; 16:15	Cuba	27–37	Austria	Trondheim, Norway; Attendance: 724; Referees: Marić, Gardinovački (SRB)
1 December; 16:15		(13–15)		Trondheim, Norway; Attendance: 724; Referees: Marić, Gardinovački (SRB)

1 December; 18:00	Ukraine	16–18	France	Trondheim, Norway; Attendance: 890; Referees: Marjan Nachevski, Dragan Nachevski (MKD)
1 December; 18:00		(7–11)		Trondheim, Norway; Attendance: 890; Referees: Marjan Nachevski, Dragan Nachevski (MKD)

2 December; 13:30	Austria	32–24	Ivory Coast	Trondheim, Norway; Attendance: 905; Referees: Marjan Nachevski, Dragan Nachevski (MKD)
2 December; 13:30		(19–8)		Trondheim, Norway; Attendance: 905; Referees: Marjan Nachevski, Dragan Nachevski (MKD)

2 December; 15:15	Ukraine	41–19	Cuba	Trondheim, Norway; Attendance: 916; Referees: Malik de Tchara, Al Lail (ARG)
2 December; 15:15		(21–12)		Trondheim, Norway; Attendance: 916; Referees: Malik de Tchara, Al Lail (ARG)

2 December; 17:00	France	22–20	Romania	Trondheim, Norway; Attendance: 940; Referees: Marić, Gardinovački (SRB)
2 December; 17:00		(10–12)		Trondheim, Norway; Attendance: 940; Referees: Marić, Gardinovački (SRB)

4 December; 12:00	Ivory Coast	20–29	Ukraine	Trondheim, Norway; Attendance: 467; Referees: Malik de Tchara, Al Lail (ARG)
4 December; 12:00		(8–14)		Trondheim, Norway; Attendance: 467; Referees: Malik de Tchara, Al Lail (ARG)

4 December; 13:45	France	34–21	Cuba	Trondheim, Norway; Attendance: 612; Referees: Klucso, Lekrinszki (HUN)
4 December; 13:45		(14–14)		Trondheim, Norway; Attendance: 612; Referees: Klucso, Lekrinszki (HUN)

4 December; 15:30	Romania	30–27	Austria	Trondheim, Norway; Attendance: 6,724; Referees: Marjan Nachevski, Dragan Nachevski (MKD)
4 December; 15:30		(18–15)		Trondheim, Norway; Attendance: 6,724; Referees: Marjan Nachevski, Dragan Nachevski (MKD)

5 December; 14:00	Cuba	17–32	Ivory Coast	Trondheim, Norway; Attendance: 407; Referees: Marić, Gardinovački (SRB)
5 December; 14:00		(6–13)		Trondheim, Norway; Attendance: 407; Referees: Marić, Gardinovački (SRB)

5 December; 16:00	Romania	26–27	Ukraine	Trondheim, Norway; Attendance: 523; Referees: Marjan Nachevski, Dragan Nachevski (MKD)
5 December; 16:00		(11–17)		Trondheim, Norway; Attendance: 523; Referees: Marjan Nachevski, Dragan Nachevski (MKD)

5 December; 18:00	Austria	22–19	France	Trondheim, Norway; Attendance: 434; Referees: Klucso, Lekrinszki (HUN)
5 December; 18:00		(10–10)		Trondheim, Norway; Attendance: 434; Referees: Klucso, Lekrinszki (HUN)

=== Group C ===
Pos	Team	Pld	W	D	L	GF	GA	GD	Pts	Qualification
1	Denmark	5	5	0	0	159	84	+75	10	Round of 16
2	Germany	5	3	1	1	137	100	+37	7	Round of 16
3	Macedonia	5	3	0	2	136	107	+29	6	Round of 16
4	Angola	5	1	2	2	113	120	−7	4	Round of 16
5	Japan	5	1	1	3	118	124	−6	3	
6	Argentina	5	0	0	5	52	180	−128	0	

30 November; 16:30	Macedonia	27–25	Japan	Kolding, Denmark; Attendance: 500; Referees: Bord, Buy (FRA)
30 November; 16:30		(15–10)		Kolding, Denmark; Attendance: 500; Referees: Bord, Buy (FRA)

30 November; 19:30	Germany	33–9	Argentina	Kolding, Denmark; Attendance: 650; Referees: Silva, Righeto (BRA)
30 November; 19:30		(15–5)		Kolding, Denmark; Attendance: 650; Referees: Silva, Righeto (BRA)

30 November; 20:40	Denmark	31–12	Angola	Kolding, Denmark; Attendance: 2,500; Referees: Goulao, Macau (POR)
30 November; 20:40		(15–7)		Kolding, Denmark; Attendance: 2,500; Referees: Goulao, Macau (POR)

1 December; 16:30	Argentina	10–33	Macedonia	Kolding, Denmark; Attendance: 600; Referees: Goulao, Macau (POR)
1 December; 16:30		(3–10)		Kolding, Denmark; Attendance: 600; Referees: Goulao, Macau (POR)

1 December; 18:30	Angola	20–20	Germany	Kolding, Denmark; Attendance: 1,500; Referees: Kohout, Dolejs (CZE)
1 December; 18:30		(10–10)		Kolding, Denmark; Attendance: 1,500; Referees: Kohout, Dolejs (CZE)

1 December; 20:40	Japan	15–28	Denmark	Kolding, Denmark; Attendance: 3,000; Referees: Silva, Righeto (BRA)
1 December; 20:40		(8–13)		Kolding, Denmark; Attendance: 3,000; Referees: Silva, Righeto (BRA)

2 December; 16:30	Germany	23–18	Macedonia	Kolding, Denmark; Attendance: 500; Referees: Bord, Buy (FRA)
2 December; 16:30		(12–8)		Kolding, Denmark; Attendance: 500; Referees: Bord, Buy (FRA)

2 December; 18:30	Angola	22–22	Japan	Kolding, Denmark; Attendance: 800; Referees: Goulao, Macau (POR)
2 December; 18:30		(8–10)		Kolding, Denmark; Attendance: 800; Referees: Goulao, Macau (POR)

2 December; 20:40	Denmark	42–5	Argentina	Kolding, Denmark; Attendance: 3,000; Referees: Kohout, Dolejs (CZE)
2 December; 20:40		(18–3)		Kolding, Denmark; Attendance: 3,000; Referees: Kohout, Dolejs (CZE)

4 December; 16:30	Germany	32–22	Japan	Kolding, Denmark; Attendance: 500; Referees: Silva, Righeto (BRA)
4 December; 16:30		(12–10)		Kolding, Denmark; Attendance: 500; Referees: Silva, Righeto (BRA)

4 December; 18:30	Argentina	13–37	Angola	Kolding, Denmark; Attendance: 1,300; Referees: Bord, Buy (FRA)
4 December; 18:30		(4–19)		Kolding, Denmark; Attendance: 1,300; Referees: Bord, Buy (FRA)

4 December; 20:40	Macedonia	24–27	Denmark	Kolding, Denmark; Attendance: 3,000; Referees: Goulao, Macau (POR)
4 December; 20:40		(11–11)		Kolding, Denmark; Attendance: 3,000; Referees: Goulao, Macau (POR)

5 December; 14:00	Japan	34–15	Argentina	Kolding, Denmark; Attendance: 500; Referees: Silva, Righeto (BRA)
5 December; 14:00		(17–6)		Kolding, Denmark; Attendance: 500; Referees: Silva, Righeto (BRA)

5 December; 16:00	Macedonia	34–22	Angola	Kolding, Denmark; Attendance: 2,000; Referees: Bord, Buy (FRA)
5 December; 16:00		(17–11)		Kolding, Denmark; Attendance: 2,000; Referees: Bord, Buy (FRA)

5 December; 18:00	Denmark	31–28	Germany	Kolding, Denmark; Attendance: 3,000; Referees: Kohout, Dolejs (CZE)
5 December; 18:00		(13–13)		Kolding, Denmark; Attendance: 3,000; Referees: Kohout, Dolejs (CZE)

=== Group D ===
Pos	Team	Pld	W	D	L	GF	GA	GD	Pts	Qualification
1	Hungary	5	5	0	0	162	109	+53	10	Round of 16
2	South Korea	5	4	0	1	151	115	+36	8	Round of 16
3	Russia	5	3	0	2	159	122	+37	6	Round of 16
4	Brazil	5	1	1	3	104	123	−19	3	Round of 16
5	China	5	1	1	3	120	140	−20	3	
6	Congo	5	0	0	5	91	178	−87	0	

30 November; 13:30	South Korea	29–19	China	Lillehammer, Norway; Attendance: 1,636; Referees: Vakula, Liudovyk (UKR)
30 November; 13:30		(15–9)		Lillehammer, Norway; Attendance: 1,636; Referees: Vakula, Liudovyk (UKR)

30 November; 15:30	Hungary	22–13	Brazil	Lillehammer, Norway; Attendance: 430; Referees: Nilsson, Hagen (SWE)
30 November; 15:30		(10–5)		Lillehammer, Norway; Attendance: 430; Referees: Nilsson, Hagen (SWE)

30 November; 17:30	Russia	42–20	Congo	Lillehammer, Norway; Referees: Forbord, Jorstad (NOR)
30 November; 17:30		(19–14)		Lillehammer, Norway; Referees: Forbord, Jorstad (NOR)

1 December; 14:00	Brazil	20–27	South Korea	Gjøvik, Norway; Attendance: 412; Referees: Forbord, Jorstad (NOR)
1 December; 14:00		(10–14)		Gjøvik, Norway; Attendance: 412; Referees: Forbord, Jorstad (NOR)

1 December; 16:00	Congo	17–39	Hungary	Gjøvik, Norway; Attendance: 476; Referees: Vakula, Liudovyk (UKR)
1 December; 16:00		(10–17)		Gjøvik, Norway; Attendance: 476; Referees: Vakula, Liudovyk (UKR)

1 December; 18:00	China	21–38	Russia	Gjøvik, Norway; Attendance: 697; Referees: Benmila, Besses (ALG)
1 December; 18:00		(10–17)		Gjøvik, Norway; Attendance: 697; Referees: Benmila, Besses (ALG)

2 December; 13:30	Brazil	30–20	Congo	Lillehammer, Norway; Attendance: 650; Referees: Nilsso, Hagen (SWE)
2 December; 13:30		(16–8)		Lillehammer, Norway; Attendance: 650; Referees: Nilsso, Hagen (SWE)

2 December; 15:30	South Korea	30–24	Russia	Lillehammer, Norway; Attendance: 1,570; Referees: Vakula, Liudovyk (UKR)
2 December; 15:30		(16–10)		Lillehammer, Norway; Attendance: 1,570; Referees: Vakula, Liudovyk (UKR)

2 December; 17:30	Hungary	34–25	China	Lillehammer, Norway; Attendance: 560; Referees: Besses, Benmila (ALG)
2 December; 17:30		(15–10)		Lillehammer, Norway; Attendance: 560; Referees: Besses, Benmila (ALG)

4 December; 11:00	South Korea	36–19	Congo	Hamar, Norway; Attendance: 700; Referees: Nilsson, Hagen (SWE)
4 December; 11:00		(20–10)		Hamar, Norway; Attendance: 700; Referees: Nilsson, Hagen (SWE)

4 December; 13:30	China	24–24	Brazil	Hamar, Norway; Attendance: 250; Referees: Forbord, Jorstad (NOR)
4 December; 13:30		(12–10)		Hamar, Norway; Attendance: 250; Referees: Forbord, Jorstad (NOR)

4 December; 15:00	Russia	25–34	Hungary	Hamar, Norway; Attendance: 250; Referees: Gallego, Lamas (ESP)
4 December; 15:00		(8–22)		Hamar, Norway; Attendance: 250; Referees: Gallego, Lamas (ESP)

5 December; 14:00	Congo	15–31	China	Hamar, Norway; Attendance: 200; Referees: Vakula, Liudovyk (UKR)
5 December; 14:00		(11–11)		Hamar, Norway; Attendance: 200; Referees: Vakula, Liudovyk (UKR)

5 December; 16:00	Russia	30–17	Brazil	Hamar, Norway; Attendance: 150; Referees: Nilsson, Hagen (SWE)
5 December; 16:00		(15–8)		Hamar, Norway; Attendance: 150; Referees: Nilsson, Hagen (SWE)

5 December; 18:00	Hungary	33–29	South Korea	Hamar, Norway; Attendance: 250; Referees: Forbord, Jorstad (NOR)
5 December; 18:00		(17–16)		Hamar, Norway; Attendance: 250; Referees: Forbord, Jorstad (NOR)

== Knockout stage ==
=== Brackets ===
Round of 16
B1	Austria	28
A4	Belarus	27
D3	Russia	19
C2	Germany	22
B3	Ukraine	19
A2	Norway	24
D1	Hungary	38
C4	Angola	18
C3	Macedonia	28
D2	South Korea	27
A1	Netherlands	16
B4	Romania	26
A3	Poland	21
B2	France	28
C1	Denmark	30
D4	Brazil	23

Quarterfinals
B1	Austria	24
C2	Germany	13
A2	Norway	24
D1	Hungary	21
C3	Macedonia	21
B4	Romania	33
B2	France (OT)	19
C1	Denmark	17

Semifinals
B1	Austria	18
A2	Norway	30
B4	Romania	17
B2	France	18

Final
A2	Norway (OT)	25
B2	France	24
Third place
B1	Austria (OT)	31
B4	Romania	28

=== Round of 16 ===
7 December; 12:30	Netherlands	16-26	Romania	Gjøvik, Norway; Attendance: 180; Referees: Vakula, Liudovyk (UKR)
7 December; 12:30		(3–9)		Gjøvik, Norway; Attendance: 180; Referees: Vakula, Liudovyk (UKR)

7 December; 15:00	Austria	28–27	Belarus	Bergen, Norway; Attendance: 1,752; Referees: Kohout, Dolejs (CZE)
7 December; 15:00		(15–17)		Bergen, Norway; Attendance: 1,752; Referees: Kohout, Dolejs (CZE)

7 December; 15:00	Hungary	38–18	Angola	Gjøvik, Norway; Attendance: 350; Referees: Chung, Lim (KOR)
7 December; 15:00		(16–9)		Gjøvik, Norway; Attendance: 350; Referees: Chung, Lim (KOR)

7 December; 16:30	Macedonia	28–27	South Korea	Trondheim, Norway; Attendance: 2,040; Referees: Klucso, Lekrinszki (HUN)
7 December; 16:30		(15–12)		Trondheim, Norway; Attendance: 2,040; Referees: Klucso, Lekrinszki (HUN)

7 December; 17:30	Poland	21–28	France	Bergen, Norway; Attendance: 1,762; Referees: Forbord, Jorstad (NOR)
7 December; 17:30		(9–14)		Bergen, Norway; Attendance: 1,762; Referees: Forbord, Jorstad (NOR)

7 December; 17:30	Russia	19–22	Germany	Gjøvik, Norway; Attendance: 431; Referees: Kalin, Korič (SLO)
7 December; 17:30		(7–8)		Gjøvik, Norway; Attendance: 431; Referees: Kalin, Korič (SLO)

7 December; 19:00	Ukraine	19–24	Norway	Trondheim, Norway; Attendance: 3,120; Referees: Marić, Gardinovački (SRB)
7 December; 19:00		(11–12)		Trondheim, Norway; Attendance: 3,120; Referees: Marić, Gardinovački (SRB)

7 December; 20:40	Denmark	30–23	Brazil	Kolding, Denmark; Attendance: 3,000; Referees: Bord, Buy (FRA)
7 December; 20:40		(15–14)		Kolding, Denmark; Attendance: 3,000; Referees: Bord, Buy (FRA)

=== Quarter-finals ===
9 December; 15:30	Romania	33–21	Macedonia	Hamar, Norway; Attendance: 100; Referees: Forbord, Jorstad (NOR)
9 December; 15:30		(21–9)		Hamar, Norway; Attendance: 100; Referees: Forbord, Jorstad (NOR)

9 December; 18:00	Germany	13–24	Austria	Hamar, Norway; Attendance: 500; Referees: Gallego, Lamas (ESP)
9 December; 18:00		(3–15)		Hamar, Norway; Attendance: 500; Referees: Gallego, Lamas (ESP)

9 December; 19:00	Norway	24–21	Hungary	Trondheim, Norway; Attendance: 4,038; Referees: Marjan Nachevski, Dragan Nachevski (MKD)
9 December; 19:00		(15–11)		Trondheim, Norway; Attendance: 4,038; Referees: Marjan Nachevski, Dragan Nachevski (MKD)

9 December; 20:40	Denmark	17–19	France	Hamar, Norway; Attendance: 1000; Referees: Kalin, Korič (SLO)
9 December; 20:40		(7–9, 13–13)		Hamar, Norway; Attendance: 1000; Referees: Kalin, Korič (SLO)

== Final round ==
=== Semi-finals ===
11 December; 16:30	Romania	17–18	France	Håkons Hall, Lillehammer, Norway; Attendance: 6,000; Referees: Marjan Nachevski, Dragan Nachevski (MKD)
11 December; 16:30		(8–9)		Håkons Hall, Lillehammer, Norway; Attendance: 6,000; Referees: Marjan Nachevski, Dragan Nachevski (MKD)

11 December; 19:00	Austria	18–30	Norway	Håkons Hall, Lillehammer, Norway; Attendance: 8,200; Referees: Kohout, Dolejs (CZE)
11 December; 19:00		(6–12)		Håkons Hall, Lillehammer, Norway; Attendance: 8,200; Referees: Kohout, Dolejs (CZE)

=== Placement matches ===
11 December; 11:30	Hungary	39–25	Germany	Håkons Hall, Lillehammer, Norway; Attendance: 700; Referees: Forbord, Jorstad (NOR)
11 December; 11:30		(21–10)		Håkons Hall, Lillehammer, Norway; Attendance: 700; Referees: Forbord, Jorstad (NOR)

11 December; 14:00	Denmark	30–25	Macedonia	Håkons Hall, Lillehammer, Norway; Attendance: 2,300; Referees: Maric, Gardinovacki (SRB)
11 December; 14:00		(16–13)		Håkons Hall, Lillehammer, Norway; Attendance: 2,300; Referees: Maric, Gardinovacki (SRB)

==== 7th/8th ====
12 December; 10:30	Macedonia	26–37	Germany	Håkons Hall, Lillehammer, Norway; Attendance: 500; Referees: Klucso, Lekrinszki (HUN)
12 December; 10:30		(15–19)		Håkons Hall, Lillehammer, Norway; Attendance: 500; Referees: Klucso, Lekrinszki (HUN)

==== 5th/6th ====
12 December; 13:00	Denmark	27–35	Hungary	Håkons Hall, Lillehammer, Norway; Attendance: 4,100; Referees: Malik de Tchara, Al Lail (ARG)
12 December; 13:00		(13–20)		Håkons Hall, Lillehammer, Norway; Attendance: 4,100; Referees: Malik de Tchara, Al Lail (ARG)

=== Bronze Match ===
12 December; 15:30	Romania	28–31	Austria	Håkons Hall, Lillehammer, Norway; Attendance: 7,900; Referees: Maric, Gardinovacki (SRB)
12 December; 15:30		(14–14, 26–26)		Håkons Hall, Lillehammer, Norway; Attendance: 7,900; Referees: Maric, Gardinovacki (SRB)

=== Final ===
12 December; 18:00	France	24–25	Norway	Håkons Hall, Lillehammer, Norway; Attendance: 11,200; Referees: Gallego, Lamas (ESP)
12 December; 18:00		(10–8, 18–18, 21–21)		Håkons Hall, Lillehammer, Norway; Attendance: 11,200; Referees: Gallego, Lamas (ESP)

== Rankings and statistics ==
Classification
	Norway
	France
	Austria
4	Romania
5	Hungary
6	Denmark
7	Germany
8	Macedonia
9	South Korea
10	Netherlands
11	Poland
12	Russia
13	Ukraine
14	Belarus
15	Angola
16	Brazil
17	Japan
18	China
19	Czech Republic
20	Ivory Coast
21	Cuba
22	Congo
23	Australia
24	Argentina

1999 Women's World Champions

Norway
First Title

Team roster

Cecilie Leganger, Heidi Tjugum, Susann Goksør Bjerkrheim, Else-Marthe Sørlie, Kjersti Grini, Trine Haltvik, Tonje Larsen, Elisabeth Hilmo, Kristine Duvholt, Mette Davidsen, Jeanette Nilsen, Ann Cathrin Eriksen, Mia Hundvin, Sahra Hausmann, Birgitte Sættem and Marianne Rokne.
Head coach: Marit Breivik.

=== All Star Team ===
Left wing:	Dóra Lőwy (HUN)
Pivot:	Tonje Kjærgaard (DEN)
Right wing:	Kristine Duvholt (NOR)
Left back:	Ausra Fridrikas (AUT)
Playmaker:	Nodjialem Myaro (FRA)
Right back:	Indira Kastratovic (MKD)
Goalkeeper:	Cecilie Leganger (NOR)

Chosen by team officials and IHF experts: IHF.info

=== Top Goalkeepers ===
Rank	Name	Team	Save %
1	Cecilie Leganger	Norway	49%
2	Heidi Tjugum	Norway	43%
3	Gitte Sunesen	Denmark	47%
4	Luminița Hutupan	Romania	46%
5	Valérie Nicolas	France	44%
6	Jokelyn Tienstra	Netherlands	43%
7	Andrea Farkas	Hungary	41%
8	Tanja Dshandshgava	Austria	40%

=== Top goalscorers ===
Rank	Name	Team	Goals
1	Grit Jurack	Germany	67
1	Carmen Amariei	Romania	67
3	Ausra Fridrikas	Austria	66
4	Indira Kastratovic	Macedonia	62
5	Kjersti Grini	Norway	59
6	Tanja Logvin	Austria	49
7	Svetlana Minevskaia	Belarus	46
8	Rita Deli	Hungary	45
9	Marina Abramova	Macedonia	40
9	Steluța Luca	Romania	40
