= 1996 European Women's Handball Championship =

1996 EHF European Women's Handball Championship

Tournament details
- Host country: Denmark
- Venues: 4 (in 4 host cities)
- Dates: 6–15 December
- Teams: 12 (from 1 confederation)

Final positions
- Champions: Denmark (2nd title)
- Runners-up: Norway
- Third place: Austria
- Fourth place: Germany

Tournament statistics
- Top scorer: (Norway) Kjersti Grini (48 goals)

Awards
- Best player: (Denmark) Anja Andersen

The 1996 EHF European Women's Handball Championship was the second edition of the European Championship. It was held in Denmark from 6–15 December. Denmark won their second title in a row after beating Norway 25–23 in the final.

== Venues ==
The European Championship was held in the following cities:

- Brøndby
- Vejle
- Fredericia
- Herning

== Teams ==
Group A	Group B
Austria	Germany
Croatia	Lithuania
Denmark	Norway
Hungary	Romania
Poland	Russia
Sweden	Ukraine

== Preliminary round ==
=== Group A ===
Pos	Team	Pld	W	D	L	GF	GA	GD	Pts	Qualification
1	Denmark (H)	5	5	0	0	148	101	+47	10	Semifinals
2	Austria	5	4	0	1	125	105	+20	8	Semifinals
3	Croatia	5	3	0	2	121	120	+1	6	Fifth place game
4	Sweden	5	2	0	3	114	139	−25	4	Seventh place game
5	Hungary	5	1	0	4	109	127	−18	2	Ninth place game
6	Poland	5	0	0	5	107	132	−25	0	Eleventh place game

(H) Hosts

December 6, 1996	Hungary	21 – 19	Poland
December 6, 1996		(10–10)

December 6, 1996	Denmark	30 – 13	Sweden
December 6, 1996		(13–6)

December 6, 1996	Croatia	21 – 25	Austria
December 6, 1996		(9–12)

December 7, 1996	Sweden	31 – 26	Hungary
December 7, 1996		(13–13)

December 7, 1996	Poland	21 – 25	Croatia
December 7, 1996		(11–11)

December 7, 1996	Austria	16 – 29	Denmark
December 7, 1996		(6–14)

December 8, 1996	Sweden	18 – 31	Austria
December 8, 1996		(9–13)

December 8, 1996	Hungary	19 – 24	Croatia
December 8, 1996		(11–13)

December 8, 1996	Denmark	33 – 22	Poland
December 8, 1996		(14–9)

December 10, 1996	Poland	23 – 24	Sweden
December 10, 1996		(7–16)

December 10, 1996	Croatia	22 – 27	Denmark
December 10, 1996		(10–14)

December 10, 1996	Hungary	15 – 24	Austria
December 10, 1996		(7–11)

December 11, 1996	Croatia	29 – 28	Sweden
December 11, 1996		(15–14)

December 11, 1996	Denmark	29 – 28	Hungary
December 11, 1996		(14–14)

December 11, 1996	Austria	29 – 22	Poland
December 11, 1996		(15–10)

=== Group B ===
Pos	Team	Pld	W	D	L	GF	GA	GD	Pts	Qualification
1	Norway	5	3	2	0	134	106	+28	8	Semifinals
2	Germany	5	4	0	1	124	111	+13	8	Semifinals
3	Romania	5	3	1	1	132	122	+10	7	Fifth place game
4	Russia	5	2	1	2	132	119	+13	5	Seventh place game
5	Ukraine	5	1	0	4	114	122	−8	2	Ninth place game
6	Lithuania	5	0	0	5	97	153	−56	0	Eleventh place game

December 6, 1996	Norway	36 – 18	Lithuania
December 6, 1996		(17–9)

December 6, 1996	Russia	30 – 23	Ukraine
December 6, 1996		(14–13)

December 6, 1996	Germany	22 – 21	Romania
December 6, 1996		(12–11)

December 7, 1996	Ukraine	19 – 23	Norway
December 7, 1996		(11–14)

December 7, 1996	Lithuania	17 – 27	Germany
December 7, 1996		(7–13)

December 7, 1996	Romania	29 – 26	Russia
December 7, 1996		(15–14)

December 8, 1996	Russia	22 – 22	Norway
December 8, 1996		(12–9)

December 8, 1996	Germany	25 – 23	Ukraine
December 8, 1996		(13–10)

December 8, 1996	Romania	32 – 26	Lithuania
December 8, 1996		(16–12)

December 10, 1996	Ukraine	22 – 24	Romania
December 10, 1996		(13–13)

December 10, 1996	Russia	31 – 16	Lithuania
December 10, 1996		(14–8)

December 10, 1996	Norway	27 – 21	Germany
December 10, 1996		(11–7)

December 11, 1996	Norway	26 – 26	Romania
December 11, 1996		(12–16)

December 11, 1996	Lithuania	20 – 27	Ukraine
December 11, 1996		(12–16)

December 11, 1996	Germany	29 – 23	Russia
December 11, 1996		(14–11)

== Eleventh place game ==
December 13, 1996
17:00
Poland
30 – 27 (ET)
Lithuania
Herning
Attendance: 1000
Referees: Wassili Fegir, Dmitri Stegura (UKR)
Pawelska 16
(11–11)
Pavoliene 15
3× (yellow card) 8× (suspension) 1× (red card)
Report
2× (yellow card) 9× (suspension) 1× (red card)

FT: 23–23 ET: 30–27

== Ninth place game ==
December 13, 1996; 16:00	Hungary	22 – 27	Ukraine	Fredericia; Attendance: 50; Referees: Giampiero Masi, Piero Di Piero (ITA)
December 13, 1996; 16:00	Mátéfi 8	(14–14)	Martynienko 6	Fredericia; Attendance: 50; Referees: Giampiero Masi, Piero Di Piero (ITA)
December 13, 1996; 16:00	3× (yellow card) 4× (suspension) 0× (red card)	Report	3× (yellow card) 2× (suspension) 0× (red card)	Fredericia; Attendance: 50; Referees: Giampiero Masi, Piero Di Piero (ITA)

== Seventh place game ==
December 13, 1996; 18:00	Sweden	28 – 32	Russia	Fredericia; Attendance: 108; Referees: Stevan Popov, Zivan Stakic (SRB)
December 13, 1996; 18:00	Rosenberg Olsson 8	(15–18)	Malakhova 8	Fredericia; Attendance: 108; Referees: Stevan Popov, Zivan Stakic (SRB)
December 13, 1996; 18:00	3× (yellow card) 2× (suspension) 0× (red card)	Report	6× (yellow card) 0× (suspension) 0× (red card)	Fredericia; Attendance: 108; Referees: Stevan Popov, Zivan Stakic (SRB)

== Fifth place game ==
December 13, 1996; 20:00	Croatia	17 – 23	Romania	Fredericia; Attendance: 50; Referees: Per Elbrønd, Kjeld Løvqvist (DEN)
December 13, 1996; 20:00	Nemaskalo 4	(10–9)	Cozma 6	Fredericia; Attendance: 50; Referees: Per Elbrønd, Kjeld Løvqvist (DEN)
December 13, 1996; 20:00	3× (yellow card) 5× (suspension) 0× (red card)	Report	3× (yellow card) 6× (suspension) 0× (red card)	Fredericia; Attendance: 50; Referees: Per Elbrønd, Kjeld Løvqvist (DEN)

== Final round ==
Semi-Final
December 13, 1996
Denmark	24
Germany	22
December 13, 1996
Norway	22
Austria	20

Final
December 15, 1996
Denmark	25
Norway	23
3rd/4th Place
December 15, 1996
Germany	23
Austria	30

=== Semifinals ===
December 13, 1996
19:00
Denmark
24 – 22
Germany
Herning
Attendance: 4500
Referees: Grigorij Guterman, Feliksas Gedvilas (LTU)
Andersen 6
(13–10)
Jurack 6
3× (yellow card) 2× (suspension) 0× (red card)
Report
3× (yellow card) 2× (suspension) 0× (red card)

FT: 24-22

December 13, 1996; 21:00	Norway	22 – 20	Austria	Herning; Attendance: 4500; Referees: Jeno Klucso, Tivadar Lekrinszki (HUN)
December 13, 1996; 21:00	Grini 9	(11–11)	Fridrikas, Teodorovic 5	Herning; Attendance: 4500; Referees: Jeno Klucso, Tivadar Lekrinszki (HUN)
December 13, 1996; 21:00	3× (yellow card) 3× (suspension) 0× (red card)	Report	2× (yellow card) 2× (suspension) 0× (red card)	Herning; Attendance: 4500; Referees: Jeno Klucso, Tivadar Lekrinszki (HUN)

=== Bronze medal match ===
December 15, 1996; 14:00	Austria	30 – 23	Germany	Herning; Attendance: 4500; Referees: Francois Garcia, Jean-Pierre Morena (FRA)
December 15, 1996; 14:00		(18–8)		Herning; Attendance: 4500; Referees: Francois Garcia, Jean-Pierre Morena (FRA)
December 15, 1996; 14:00		Report		Herning; Attendance: 4500; Referees: Francois Garcia, Jean-Pierre Morena (FRA)

=== Gold medal match ===
December 15, 1996; 16:00	Denmark	25 – 23	Norway	Herning; Attendance: 4500; Referees: Stefan Arnaldsson, Rögnvald Erlingsson (ISL)
December 15, 1996; 16:00	Sunesen 6	(10–10)	Haltvik 10	Herning; Attendance: 4500; Referees: Stefan Arnaldsson, Rögnvald Erlingsson (ISL)
December 15, 1996; 16:00	3× (yellow card) 0× (suspension) 0× (red card)	Report	3× (yellow card) 0× (suspension) 0× (red card)	Herning; Attendance: 4500; Referees: Stefan Arnaldsson, Rögnvald Erlingsson (ISL)

== Final ranking ==
1st place, gold medalist(s)	Denmark
2nd place, silver medalist(s)	Norway
3rd place, bronze medalist(s)	Austria
4	Germany
5	Romania
6	Croatia
7	Russia
8	Sweden
9	Ukraine
10	Hungary
11	Poland
12	Lithuania

1996 Women's European champions

Denmark
2nd title

Anja Andersen, Camilla Andersen, Kristine Andersen, Heidi Astrup, Tina Bøttzau, Marianne Florman, Anja Hansen, Anette Hoffmann, Tonje Kjærgaard, Janne Kolling, Susanne Lauritsen, Gitte Madsen, Lene Rantala, Gitte Sunesen, Anne Dorthe Tanderup, Mette Vestergaard, Head coach: Ulrik Wilbek.
