= 1993 World Women's Handball Championship squads =

List of handball players

This article displays the squads for the 1993 World Women's Handball Championship in Norway.

== Teams ==
=== Angola ===
- Bernadeth Rodrigues
- Elisa Peres
- Fabia Raposo
- Filomena Jose Trindade
- Teresa Ulundo
- Maria Teresa Neto Joaquim
- Anica Miguel Joao Neto
- Felisbela Teixeira
- Ana Cristina Ramos
- Elisa Webba
- Virginia De Carvalho
- Luzia Bezerra
- Ilda Maria Bengue
- Anabela Joaquim
- Esmeraldin De Carvalho

=== Austria ===
- Nataliya Rusnachenko
- Mariann Rácz
- Liliana Topea
- Edit Matei
- Barbara Strass
- Stanka Božović
- Iris Morhammer
- Sylvia Strass
- Marianna Godor
- Beatrice Wagner
- Karin Prokop
- Jadranka Jez
- Simone Pruscha
- Desanka Stojanović

=== China ===
- Zhu Juefeng
- Wang Yuehan
- Shi Wei
- Chao Zhai
- Bu Qirong
- Shi Shuiwen
- Lu Quanghong
- Chen Wei
- Wang Yuehao
- Li Jianfang
- Chen Waiyun
- Chen Bangping
- Huang Shuping
- Wu Xingjiang
- Chen Haiyun

=== Czechoslovakia ===
- Lenka Černá
- Mariana Bozikova
- Zuzana Prekopova
- Lubica Hlavata
- Petra Čumplová
- Zuzana Pospisilova
- Erika Baloghova
- Renata Velicka
- Gabriela Sabadosova
- Julia Kolecaniova
- Lubica Ladiscova
- Gabriela Korandova
- Marie Libanska
- Andrea Kostkova
- Eva Lepesova
- Renata Tarhaiova

=== Denmark ===
- Lene Rantala
- Susanne Munk-Lauritsen
- Anja Andersen
- Lise-Lotte Lauridsen
- Anette Hoffmann
- Tina Bøttzau
- Rikke Solberg
- Janne Kolling
- Gitte Madsen
- Anne Dorthe Tanderup
- Vivi Kjærsgaard
- Marianne Florman
- Camilla Andersen
- Anja Byrial Hansen
- Conny Hamann
- Tonje Kjærgaard

=== Germany ===
- Sabine Adamik
- Eike Bram
- Bianca Urbanke
- Heike Axmann
- Andrea Bölk
- Birgit Wagner
- Sybille Gruner
- Renata Zienkiewicz
- Carola Ciszewski
- Michaela Erler
- Gabriele Palme
- Cordula David
- Franziska Heinz
- Heike Murrweiß
- Karen Heinrich
- Michaela Schanze

=== Hungary ===
- Erika Csapó (LB)
- Edit Csendes (CB)
- Éva Erdős (LW)
- Ágnes Farkas (LB)
- Beáta Hoffmann (GK)
- Erzsébet Kocsis (LP)
- Beatrix Kökény (CB)
- Eszter Mátéfi (LB)
- Anikó Meksz (GK)
- Helga Németh (RB)
- Erika Oravecz (LP)
- Melinda Szabó (RB)
- Katalin Szilágyi (RW)
- Brigitta Szopóczy (GK)
- Ágota Utasi (RW)
- Márta Varga (LB)

=== Lithuania ===
- Dalia Dabulskienė
- Jurate Jankaitienė
- Rasa Šulskytė
- Daiva Zinkevičienė
- Ingrida Radzevičiūtė
- Elena Berčiūnienė
- Rima Sypkuvienė
- Larisa Pavolienė
- Rūta Viščinytė
- Ausra Seselskytė
- Vilma Leonaciviutė
- Lina Baronaitė
- ...

=== Norway ===
- Annette Skotvoll
- Cecilie Leganger
- Cathrine Svendsen
- Heidi Sundal
- Karin Pettersen
- Susann Goksør Bjerkrheim
- Tonje Sagstuen
- Siri Eftedal
- Kristine Duvholt Havnas
- Marte Eliasson
- Hege Kristine Kvitsand
- Mona Dahle
- Mette Davidsen
- Hege Frøseth
- Connie Mathisen
- Kristine Duvholt

=== Poland ===
- Alicja Główczak
- Izabela Kowalewska
- Bożena Karkut
- Mirella Mierzejewska
- Anna Ejsmont
- Anna Garwacka
- Sławomira Jezierska
- Iwona Nabożna
- Agnieszka Zienkiewicz
- Iwona Budzyńska
- Alicja Klonowska
- Iwona Nabozna
- Małgorzata Jędrzejczak
- Renata Żukiel
- Mariola Tułaj
- Dorota Sobolewska

=== Romania ===
- Carmen Petca
- Mariana Tîrcă
- Valentina Cozma
- Marilena Doiciu
- Lidia Drăgănescu
- Sorina Teodorovic
- Florica Ivan
- Nicoleta Cîrţu
- Simona Iovănescu
- Lenuta Bors
- Corina Şchiopu
- Gabriela Artene
- Nadina Dumitru
- Elisabeta Roşu
- Mihaela Ciobanu
- Sorina Arvatu

=== Russia ===
- Svetlana Bogdanova
- Natalya Morskova
- Natalya Deryugina
- Larisa Kiselyova
- Elina Guseva
- Irina Gorichnaia
- Svetlana Mozgovaya
- Tatiana Chernycheva
- Ekaterina Sergeeva
- Raissa Verakso
- Zhanna Sabadash
- Svetlana Vydrina
- Lina Neudakhina
- Veronica Gasanova

=== South Korea ===
- Moon Gyeong-ja
- Cha Jae-kyung
- Hong Jeong-ho
- Lee Ho-youn
- Kim Mi-sim
- Oh Seong-ok
- Jang Young-sook
- Gu Aeh-kyung
- Kim Jeong-mi
- Kim Rang
- Lee Sang-eun
- Song Ji-ron
- Han Sun-hi
- S. Jang

=== Spain ===
- Elisabeth López
- Iasone Díez de Guereño
- Amaia Ugartamendía
- Lydia Montes
- Blanca Martín-Calero
- Cristina Gómez Arquer
- Raquel Vizcaíno
- Rosa Delia Cruz Sánchez
- Reyes Baello Vidal
- Ane Eizaguerre Manterola
- Paloma Arranz
- Cristina Martínez Lominchar
- Izaskun Múgica Zozaya
- Begoña Sánchez

=== Sweden ===
- Kristina Ström
- Kristina Jönsson
- Mia Hermansson Högdahl
- Eva Olsson
- Gunilla Olsson
- Gun Meskanen
- Lina Olsson
- Cristina Pettersson
- Lotta Engström
- Ulrika Olsson
- Eva Cecilia Ågren
- Asa Elisabeth Eriksson
- Anette Mathijs
- Gunilla Pettersson
- Madelene Olsson

=== United States ===
- Angie Raynor
- Jennifer Demby
- Dawn Marple
- Kristen Riise
- Karyn Palgut
- Sharon Cain
- Kim Clarke
- Kristen Danihy
- Chryssandra Watts
- Dawn Allinger
- Tina Drutonis
- Pat Neder
- Toni Jameson
- Laura Coenen
