= 1995 World Women's Handball Championship squads =

List of handball players

The following squads and players competed in the World Women's Handball Championship in 1995 in Austria and Hungary.

== Angola ==
1. Maria Vanga
2. Rosa Torres
3. Lidia Joao
4. Elisa Peres
5. Anica Miguel Joao Neto
6. Felisbela Teixeira
7. Filomena Jose Trindade
8. Maura Faial
9. Anabela Joaquim
10. Elisa Webba-Torres
11. Palmira De Almeida
12. Luzia Maria Bezerra
13. Fabia Raposo
14. Maria Teresa Neto Joaquim

== Austria ==
1. Tatyana Dzhandzhagava
2. Natalia Rusnachenko
3. Beate Hofmann
4. Annamaria Ur
5. Mariann Rácz
6. Sylvia Strass
7. Jadranka Jez
8. Rima Sypkuviene
9. Edith Török
10. Nicole Peißl
11. Sorina Lefter
12. Ausra Ziukiene
13. Edith Mika
14. Laura Fritz
15. Stanca Bozovic
16. Iris Morhammer
17. Barbara Strass

Coach: Gunnar Prokop

== Brazil ==
1. Margarida Conte
2. Nivia C. Pereira Cruz
3. Margarita Lobo Montao
4. Janaina M. Nunes
5. Idalina Borges Mesquita
6. Erna Tereza Lorenzon
7. Maria J. Batista Sales
8. Rosana Ferreira Aleluj
9. Lucila Vianna Da Silva
10. Eva P. Fernandes Freire
11. Dilane Azambuja Roese
12. Patricia Moreira Santos
13. Vanessa Pelli Veiga

== Canada ==
1. Melanie Simard
2. Veronique Noel
3. Caroline Benoit
4. Dominique Boivin
5. Nathalie Brochu
6. Julie Lemelin
7. Carole Coté
8. Nathalie Coté
9. Debra Dyckow
10. France Brunet
11. Carole Martin
12. Marie-Claude Pesant
13. Louise Belenger
14. Marie-Josée Racine
15. Amelie Champagnw
16. Marie-Claude Gibeau
17. Véronique Noel
18. Cyndy Drolet

Coach: Stefan Rusimov

== China ==
1. Xiaojiong Wang
2. Zhang Limei
3. Chen Haiyun
4. Ge Li Yu
5. Li Zhang
6. Che Zhihong
7. Cong Yanxia
8. Chao Zhai
9. Chen Bangping
10. Zhang Limei
11. Zhao Ying
12. Li Jianfang
13. Shi Wei
14. Li Wu

== Croatia ==
1. Adrijana Prosenjak
2. Ljerka Krajnovic
3. Danijela Tuda
4. Koraljka Milic
5. Paula Glavas
6. Klaudija Klikovac-Bubalo
7. Marija Celina
8. Samira Hasagic
9. Renata Pavlacic
10. Ines Dogan
11. Natasa Kolega
12. Vlatka Mihoci
13. Elena Nemaskalo
14. Bozica Greguric
15. Katica Korosec
16. Snjezana Petika

== Czech Republic ==
1. Lenka Cerna
2. Renata Tarhaiova
3. Ilona Simonova
4. Petra Cumplova
5. Zuzana Pospisilova
6. Zdenka Zadinova
7. Marie Libanska
8. Erika Koberova
9. Zuzana Hudakova
10. Katerina Merhautova
11. Nadezda Krejcirikova
12. Lenka Romanova
13. Marcela Roubinkova
14. Gabriela Korandova
15. Gabriela Bartuskova
16. Gabriela Buchtová

Coach: Jiri Novácek

== Denmark ==
1. Lene Rantala
2. Susanne Munk-Lauritsen
3. Conny Hamann
4. Gitte Sunesen
5. Rikke Solberg
6. Camilla Andersen
7. Tina Bøttzau-Nielsen
8. Anette Hoffmann-Møberg
9. Marianne Florman
10. Anja Andersen
11. Janne Kolling
12. Heidi Holme Astrup
13. Tonje Kjærgaard
14. Gitte Madsen
15. Sisse Bruun Jørgensen
16. Maybrit Nielsen

Coach: Ulrik Wilbek

== Germany ==
1. Michaela Schanze
2. Christine Lindemann
3. Eike Bram
4. Heike Murrweiß
5. Miroslava Ritskiavitchius
6. Emilia Luca
7. Renata Zienkiewicz
8. Csilla Elekes
9. Bianca Urbanke
10. Andrea Bölk
11. Carola Ciszewski
12. Manuela Fiedel
13. Kathrin Blacha
14. Michaela Erler
15. Silke Gnad
16. Franziska Heinz
17. Sybille Gruner

Coach: Ekke Hoffmann

== Hungary ==
1. Anikó Meksz
2. Andrea Farkas
3. Eszter Mátéfi
4. Éva Erdős
5. Ildikó Pádár
6. Erzsébet Kocsis
7. Helga Németh
8. Katalin Szilágyi
9. Ágnes Farkas
10. Anikó Kántor
11. Anikó Nagy
12. Beatrix Kökény
13. Beáta Hoffmann
14. Beáta Siti
15. Beatrix Tóth
16. Anna Szántó

Coach: László Laurencz

== Ivory Coast ==
1. Elisabeth Kouassi
2. Elisabeth Sokoury
3. Elisabeth Koudo
4. Mamba Diomande
5. Mariam Kone
6. Namama Fadika
7. Zoromou Awa
8. Hassana Coulibaly
9. Wandou Guehi
10. Fanta Traore
11. Adelaide Tiba Lou
12. Philomène Koko
13. Cathrine Sery
14. Marie-Ange Gogbe
15. Sidonie Lourougnon
16. Laurette Bodoua
17. Celine Dongo

Coach: Guy Narcisse Akpa

== Japan ==
1. Midori Murayama
2. Kiyomi Konno
3. Kayu Matsuo
4. Chiaki Furuta
5. Mari Obayashi
6. Tomoe Ishimura
7. Izumi Tanimoto
8. Seiko Nishimura
9. Emiko Kamide
10. Eni Matsumoto
11. Aya Inatsugi
12. Kayoko Onuki
13. Yuka Yamakawa
14. Mineko Tanaka
15. Miyoko Tanaka
16. Al Kojima

Coach: Kasizuka Soichi

== Norway ==
1. Cecilie Leganger
2. Heidi Marie Tjugum
3. Tonje Sagstuen
4. Kjersti Grini
5. Else Karin Bekkelund
6. Annette Skotvoll
7. Cathrine Svendsen
8. Susann Goksør Bjerkrheim
9. Kari Solem Aune
10. Mona Dahle
11. Hege Kristine Kvitsand
12. Tonje Larsen
13. Kristine Moldestad
14. Ann Cathrin Eriksen
15. Mette Davidsen

Coach: Marit Breivik

== Romania ==
1. Carmen Moldovan-Petca
2. Cristina Maria Dogaru
3. Mihaela Apostol
4. Mihaela Bobocea
5. Alina Nicoleta Dobrin
6. Elisabeta Rosu
7. Valentina Cozma
8. Lidia Draganescu
9. Mariana Tirca
10. Marinela Patru
11. Simona Iovanescu
12. Marinela Györffy
13. Corina Ciolacu
14. Roxana Gheorghiu
15. Steluta Lazar
16. Florica Vasile

Coach: Gheorghe Ionescu

== Russia ==
1. Natalia Gritsenko
2. Tatiana Tchernycheva
3. Raissa Verakso
4. Natalia Boudarina
5. Olga Evtcherenko
6. Zhanna Sabadash
7. Natalya Deriouguina
8. Larissa Kiyanitsa
9. Svetlana Mozgovaya
10. Inna Volkova
11. Irina Poletaeva
12. Natalia Malakhova
13. Svetlana Priakhina
14. Irina Akhromeeva
15. Marina Khatkova
16. Elena Beklova
17. Valeria Kozirskaya
18. Marina Grichenko

Coach: Levon Akopyan

== Slovakia ==
1. Marianna Hamerlikova
2. Marta Pernisova
3. Zlatica Kotrikova
4. Martina Ozima
5. Lubica Ladiscova
6. Zuzana Prekopova
7. Zdenka Szabova
8. Lubica Hlavata
9. Lubica Kopecka
10. Solana Bohunska
11. Janette Palova
12. Gabriela Sabadosova
13. Marcela Fecova
14. Andrea Salatova
15. Marcela Vlckova
16. Irena Horvathova

Coach: Dusan Danis

== South Korea ==
1. O-Kyeong Lim
2. Jeong-Ho Hong
3. Seong-Ok Oh
4. Eun-Mi Kim
5. Sang-Eun Lee
6. Mi-Sim Kim
7. Jeong-Lim Park
8. Rang Kim
9. Sun-Hee Han
10. Eun-Kyong Kim
11. Hye-Jeong Kwag
12. Jung-Mi Kim
13. Eun-Hee Cho
14. Aeh-Kyeong Gu
15. Young-Ran Oh
16. Gyeong-Ja Moon

== Sweden ==
1. Kristina Jönsson
2. Anna-Lena Pihl
3. Eva Olsson
4. Camilla Eriksson
5. Gunilla Olsson
6. Helen Benjaminsson
7. Karin Nilsson
8. Lotta Engström
9. Lina Olsson
10. Tuija Pasanen
11. Lena Nilsson
12. Jessica Everlönn
13. Ulrika Karlsson
14. Asa Lundmark
15. Asa Elisabeth Eriksson

Coach: Ilia Puljevic

== Ukraine ==
1. Elena Galkina
2. Svetlana Morozova
3. Ganna Kryvoruchko
4. Oksana Pavlik
5. Larissa Kouzmenko
6. Nataliya Derepasko
7. Svetlana Lelyuk
8. Tetyana Novikova
9. Irina Korotkevic
10. Nataliya Martynienko
11. Elena Putrya
12. Olena Radchenko
13. Tetyana Pereverzeva
14. Tetyana Drobinko

== USA ==
1. Tami Jameson
2. Jennifer Demby-Horton
3. Toni Jameson
4. Dawn Marple
5. Laura Coenen
6. Sharon Cain
7. Kristen Danihy
8. Kim Clarke
9. Dannette Leininger
10. Chryssandra Watts-Hires
11. Dawn Allinger
12. Pat Neder
13. Tonia Stubbs
