= Handball at the 1996 Summer Olympics – Women's team squads =

List of handball players

The following squads and players competed in the women's handball tournament at the 1996 Summer Olympics.

== Angola ==
The following players represented Angola:

- Anica Neto
- Maria Gonçalves
- Filomena Trindade
- Domingas Cordeiro
- Maura Faial
- Aña Bela Joaquim
- Lili Webba-Torres
- Palmira de Almeida
- Luzia María Bizerra
- Justina Praça
- Lia Paulo
- Mária Eduardo
- Elisa Peres

== China ==
The following players represented China:

- Che Zhihong
- Chen Bangping
- Chen Haiyun
- Cong Yanxia
- Li Jianfang
- Shi Wei
- Wang Tao
- Yu Geli
- Zhai Chao
- Zhang Li
- Zhang Limei
- Zhao Ying

== Denmark ==
Head coach: Ulrik Wilbek

The following players represented Denmark:

No.	Pos.	Name	Date of birth (age)	Height	App.	Goals	Club
1	GK	Lene Rantala	10 August 1968 (aged 27)	1.80 m	96		(Norway) Toten HK
2	RB	Anne Dorthe Tanderup	24 April 1972 (aged 24)	1.71 m	60		(Denmark) Viborg HK
4	CB	Camilla Andersen	5 July 1973 (aged 23)	1.69 m	89		(Germany) Buxtehuder SV
5	RB	Tina Bøttzau	29 August 1971 (aged 24)		77		(Denmark) GOG
6	LW	Anette Hoffmann	5 May 1971 (aged 25)	1.75 m	127	428
7	P	Anja Byrial Hansen	1 November 1973 (aged 22)		71
8	LW	Marianne Florman	1 June 1964 (aged 32)		91
9	RW	Janne Kolling	12 July 1968 (aged 28)	1.73 m	177
10	CB	Conny Hamann	16 September 1969 (aged 26)		67
11	LB	Anja Andersen	15 February 1969 (aged 27)	1.78 m	98		(Germany) TuS Walle Bremen
12	GK	Gitte Sunesen	11 December 1971 (aged 24)	1.80 m	66		(Denmark) GOG
13	LB	Gitte Madsen	24 March 1969 (aged 27)		79
14	CB	Heidi Astrup	31 May 1972 (aged 24)	1.75 m	82		(Denmark) Viborg HK
15	P	Tonje Kjærgaard	11 June 1975 (aged 21)	1.70 m	48
16	GK	Susanne Munk Lauritsen	12 October 1967 (aged 28)		127		(Denmark) Viborg HK
17	CB	Kristine Andersen	2 April 1976 (aged 20)	1.72 m	1		(Denmark) Ikast

== Germany ==
The following players represented Germany:

- Andrea Bölk
- Bianca Urbanke
- Tine Lindemann
- Csilla Elekes
- Eike Bram
- Emilia Luca
- Eva Kiss-Györi
- Franziska Heinz
- Grit Jurack
- Heike Murrweiss
- Marlies Waelzer
- Melanie Schliecker
- Michaela Erler
- Michaela Schanze
- Miroslava Ritskiavitchius

== Hungary ==
The following players represented Hungary:

- Éva Erdős
- Andrea Farkas
- Beáta Hoffmann
- Anikó Kántor
- Erzsébet Kocsis
- Beatrix Kökény
- Eszter Mátéfi
- Auguszta Mátyás
- Anikó Meksz
- Anikó Nagy
- Helga Németh
- Ildikó Pádár
- Beáta Siti
- Anna Szántó
- Katalin Szilágyi
- Beatrix Tóth

== Norway ==
The following players represented Norway:

- Heidi Tjugum
- Tonje Larsen
- Kjersti Grini
- Kristine Duvholt
- Susann Goksør-Bjerkrheim
- Kari Solem
- Mona Dahle
- Ann-Cathrin Eriksen
- Hege Kvitsand
- Trine Haltvik
- Kristine Moldestad
- Annette Skotvoll
- Mette Davidsen
- Sahra Hausmann
- Hilde Østbø

== South Korea ==
The following players represented South Korea:

- Cho Eun-Hee
- Han Sun-Hee
- Hong Jeong-ho
- Huh Soon-Young
- Kim Cheong-Sim
- Kim Eun-Mi
- Kim Jeong-Mi
- Kim Mi-Sim
- Kim Rang
- Kwag Hye-Jeong
- Lee Sang-Eun
- Lim O-Kyeong
- Moon Hyang-Ja
- Oh Sung-Ok
- Oh Yong-Ran
- Park Jeong-Lim

== United States ==
The following players represented the United States:

- Dawn Allinger
- Pat Neder
- Sharon Cain
- Kim Clarke
- Laura Coenen
- Kristen Danihy
- Jennifer Demby-Horton
- Lisa Eagen
- Laurie Fellner
- Chryssandra Hires
- Tami Jameson
- Toni Jameson
- Dannette Leininger
- Dawn Marple
- Carol Peterka
- Cheryl Abplanalp
