= 1994 European Women's Handball Championship squads =

This article lists the squads and players who competed in the 1994 European Women's Handball Championship played in Germany.

== Austria ==
1. Georgia Harmtodt
2. Sylvia Strass
3. Annamaria Ur
4. Beatrice Wagner
5. Simone Bachmann
6. Karin Prokop
7. Edit Matei
8. Nicole Peissl
9. Natalja Rusnatchenko
10. Liliana Topea
11. Dagmar Müller
12. Stanca Bozovic
13. Mariann Racz
14. Iris Morhammer
15. Barbara Freibauer

== Czech Republic ==
1. Lenka Černá
2. Zuzana Altwolf
3. Marie Libanská
4. Monika Ludmilová
5. Ilona Simonová
6. Erika Polozová
7. Petra Krbová
8. Zuzana Hudáková
9. Jarmila Koci
10. Lenka Fleková
11. Renata Tarhaiová
12. Marcela Roubínková
13. Gabriela Korandová
14. Petra Cumplová
15. Gabriela Buchtová

== Croatia ==
1. Jasenka Pilepić
2. Kaludia Klikovac‑Bubalo
3. Valentina Zusko
4. Samira Hasagić
5. Danijela Tuda
6. Renata Pavlacić
7. Ines Dogan Trošić
8. Viktorija Garnusova
9. Dijana Jelaska
10. Koralkja Milić
11. Nataša Kolega
12. Ljerka Vresk
13. Dijana Radek
14. Snježana Petika
15. Željana Stević
16. Adrijana Prosenjak

== Denmark ==
1. Lene Rantala
2. Anne Dorthe Tanderup
3. Rikke Solberg
4. Camilla Andersen
5. Tonje Kjærgaard
6. Annette Moberg
7. Anja Byrial Hansen
8. Marianne Florman
9. Janne Kolling Johannessen
10. Conny Hamann Boeriths
11. Anja Andersen
12. Gitte Sunesen Vilhelmsen
13. Susanne Boilesen
14. Heidi Holme Astrup
15. Marlene B. J. Jensen
16. Susanne Munk Laursen

== Germany ==
1. Renate Zschau
2. Kerstin Mühlner
3. Renate Zienkiewicz
4. Heike Murrweiß
5. Csilla Elekes
6. Bianca Urbanke
7. Andrea Bölk
8. Carola Ciszewski
9. Michaela Erler
10. Silke Gnad
11. Sabine Adamik‑Bothe
12. Sybille Gruner
13. Birgit Wagner
14. Franziska Heinz
15. Eike Bram
16. Josefine Grosse

== Hungary ==
1. Anikó Meksz
2. Rita Hochrajter
3. Rita Deli
4. Beatrix Balogh
5. Ildikó Pádár
6. Erzsébet Sáriné Kocsis
7. Helga Németh
8. Edit Csendes
9. Anna Szántó
10. Ágnes Farkas
11. Beáta Hoffmann
12. Ágota Utasi
13. Beatrix Tóth
14. Beatrix Kökény
15. Brigitta Szopóczy

== Norway ==
1. Cecilie Leganger
2. Tonje Sagstuen
3. Kjersti Grini
4. Kristine Moldestad
5. Susann Goksør
6. Kari Solem
7. Mona Dahle
8. Siri Seland Eftedal
9. Hege K. Kvitsand
10. Ingrid Steen
11. Annette Skottvoll
12. Kristine Duvholt Havnas
13. Marte Eliasson
14. Tonje Larsen
15. Monica Kyvåg

== Romania ==
1. Carmen Petca
2. Valentina Cozma
3. Corina Schiopu
4. Mihaela Daniela Apostol
5. Isabella Florian
6. Victorina Bora
7. Monica Ileana Iacob
8. Sorina Kosinskhi
9. Gabriela Manea
10. Marinela Gyorffy Doiciu
11. Eugenia Jitaru
12. Steluta Luca
13. Alina‑Ileana Turcas
14. Cristina Maria Dogaru Cucuian
15. Mihaela Ana Ciora

== Russia ==
1. Lioubov Korotneva
2. Marina Tchernovolenko
3. Tatiana Chernycheva
4. Lina Neoudakhina
5. Larisa Kiselova
6. Irina Gorichniaia
7. Natalia Malakhova
8. Natalya Deriouguina
9. Elena Chatalova
10. Svetlana Mozgovaya
11. Veronica Gasanova
12. Elena Kalashnikova
13. Irina Koupriianova
14. Natalia Boudarina
15. Raissa Verakso
16. Marina Gritsenko

== Sweden ==
1. Christina Ström
2. Mia Hermansson Högdahl
3. Eva Olsson
4. Gunilla Olsson
5. Malin Karlsson
6. Karin Nilsson
7. Caritha Lagerlöf
8. Caroline Cecilia Rosenberg
9. Tuija Pasanen
10. Anna Rapp Ljungdahl
11. Lotta Egnström
12. Kristina Jönsson
13. Helena Johansson
14. Malin Norén
15. Åsa Eriksson
16. Lena Andersson

== Slovakia ==
1. Marianna Gubova
2. Jana Sramenkova
3. Martina Rumanovska
4. Zlatica Kotrikova
5. Erika Baloghova
6. Zuzana Prekopova
7. Daniela Mozova
8. Ivana Kopcova
9. Janette Pálová
10. Lubica Ladiscsova
11. Marcela Fecova
12. Marta Pernisova
13. Andrea Šalatová
14. Irena Horváthová
15. Jitka Kiss
16. Janette Ivankova

== Ukraine ==
1. Irina Szamozvanova
2. Elena Rozborskaya
3. Larisa Kouzmenko
4. Nataliya Derepasko
5. Oksana Sakada
6. Svetlana Leliouk
7. Tetiana Sologub
8. Lilia Rybalka‑Ship
9. Lioudmila Kompaniets
10. Elena Putrja
11. Olga Zoubareva
12. Svitlana Morozova
13. Maya Fedorova
14. Olena Radchenko
15. Inna Dolgun
16. Tetyana Vorozhtsova
