= Handball at the 1996 Summer Olympics =

Tournament details
- Host country: USA
- Venues: 2 (in 1 host city)
- Dates: 24 July – 4 August 1996
- Teams: 20 (from 4 confederations)

Final positions
- Champions: Croatia (men); Denmark (women)
- Runners-up: Sweden (men); South Korea (women)
- Third place: Spain (men); Hungary (women)
- Fourth place: France (men); Norway (women)

Final results for the team handball competition at the 1996 Summer Olympics.

== Medal summary ==
Event	Gold	Silver	Bronze
Men	Croatia; Patrik Ćavar; Valner Franković; Slavko Goluža; Bruno Gudelj; Vladimir Jelčić; Božidar Jović; Nenad Kljaić; Venio Losert; Valter Matošević; Zoran Mikulić; Alvaro Načinović; Goran Perkovac; Iztok Puc; Zlatko Saračević; Irfan Smajlagić; Vladimir Šujster	Sweden; Magnus Andersson; Robert Andersson; Per Carlén; Martin Frändesjö; Erik Hajas; Robert Hedin; Andreas Larsson; Ola Lindgren; Stefan Lövgren; Mats Olsson; Staffan Olsson; Johan Petersson; Tomas Svensson; Tomas Sivertsson; Pierre Thorsson; Magnus Wislander	Spain; Talant Duyshebaev; Salvador Esquer; Aitor Etxaburu; Jesús Fernández; Jaume Fort; Mateo Garralda; Raúl González; Rafael Guijosa; Fernando Hernández; José Javier Hombrados; Demetrio Lozano; Jordi Núñez; Jesús Olalla; Juan Pérez; Iñaki Urdangarín; Alberto Urdiales
Women	Denmark; Anja Andersen; Camilla Andersen; Kristine Andersen; Heidi Astrup; Tina Bøttzau; Marianne Florman; Conny Hamann; Anja Hansen; Anette Hoffmann; Tonje Kjærgaard; Janne Kolling; Susanne Lauritsen; Gitte Madsen; Lene Rantala; Gitte Sunesen; Anne Dorthe Tanderup	South Korea; Cho Eun-Hee; Han Sun-Hee; Hong Jeong-ho; Huh Soon-Young; Kim Cheong-Sim; Kim Eun-Mi; Kim Jeong-Mi; Kim Mi-Sim; Kim Rang; Kwag Hye-Jeong; Lee Sang-Eun; Lim O-Kyeong; Moon Hyang-Ja; Oh Sung-Ok; Oh Yong-Ran; Park Jeong-Lim	Hungary; Éva Erdős; Andrea Farkas; Beáta Hoffmann; Anikó Kántor; Erzsébet Kocsis; Beatrix Kökény; Eszter Mátéfi; Auguszta Mátyás; Anikó Meksz; Anikó Nagy; Helga Németh; Ildikó Pádár; Beáta Siti; Anna Szántó; Katalin Szilágyi; Beatrix Tóth

== See also ==
- Handball at the 1996 Summer Olympics – Men's tournament
- Handball at the 1996 Summer Olympics – Women's tournament
