= Allinger =

Allinger is a surname. Notable people with this surname include:

- Dawn Allinger (born 1968), American former handball player
- Norman Allinger (1928–2020), American organic and computational chemist
- Ruben Allinger (1891–1979), Swedish ice hockey player
