= Dannette =

Dannette is a given name. Notable people with the given name include:

- Dannette Leininger (born 1963), American handball player
- Dannette Thomas (born 1952), American comic book writer
- Dannette Young (born 1964), American track and field athlete
- Dannette Bower (born 1983), Australian actress
