= Birgit Wagner =

German handball player (born 1969)

Personal information
- Full name: Birgit Peter
- Nationality: German
- Born: 21 January 1969 (age 57) Rostock, East Germany
- Height: 172 cm (68 in)

Sport
- Sport: Handball
- Position: Right wing

Senior clubs
- Years: Team
- -1990: SC Empor Rostock
- 1990-1994: TV Lützellinden
- 1994-1998: TuS Walle Bremen
National team
Years	Team	Apps	(Gls)
–	Germany	103	(187)
Medal record
Representing Germany
World Championship
Gold medal – first place	1993 Norway
European Championship
Silver medal – second place	1994 Germany

Birgit Wagner, married Birgit Peter (born 21 January 1969) is a German handball player. She competed in the women's tournament at the 1992 Summer Olympics. She was also on the German team that won gold medals at the 1993 World Women's Handball Championship.

== Career ==
Wagner started her career at SC Empor Rostock, where she won the East German championship in 1989. In 1990 she joined TV Lützellinden. Here she won the 1991 EHF Champions Cup in 1991, the DHB-Pokal in 1992 and the German championship in 1993. In 1994 she joined league rivals TuS Walle Bremen, where she won the 1995 and 1996 German Championships and the 1995 German Cup.

She retired in 1998 due to pregnancy.
