= Eva Kiss-Györi =

German handball player (born 1966)

Personal information
- Nationality: German-Hungarian
- Born: 21 February 1966 (age 60) Budapest, Hungary
- Height: 177 cm (70 in)

Sport
- Sport: Handball
- Position: Left back
National team
Years	Team	Apps
–	Germany	27

Eva Kiss-Györi (born 21 February 1966) is a German-Hungarian handball player. She represented Germany internationally, where she competed in the women's tournament at the 1996 Summer Olympics and at the 1996 European Championship.

She started playing handball at the Hungarian club KÉV Metró. She played three years for TuS Walle Bremen and 6 years for TV Lützellinden.

She won the German Handball-Bundesliga 4 times.
