= Sabine Bothe =

German handball player (1960–2023)

Personal information
- Nationality: German
- Born: 8 July 1960 Havelberg, East Germany
- Died: September 21, 2023 (aged 63)
- Height: 169 cm (67 in)

Sport
- Sport: Handball
- Position: Goalkeeper

Youth career
- Years: Team
- –: Havelberg

Senior clubs
- Years: Team
- 1974-1990: SC Magdeburg
- 1990-1997: TuS Walle Bremen
National team
- Years: Team
- ?-1990: East Germany
- 1990-1997: Germany
Medal record
Representing Germany
World Championship
Gold medal – first place	1993 Norway
European Championship
Silver medal – second place	1994 Germany

Sabine Heidrun Bothe (née Picken, 8 July 1960 – 21 September 2023), also known as Sabine Adamik, was a German handball goalkeeper. She won the 1993 World Championship. She also participated at the 1992 Summer Olympics, where the German national team was placed fourth.

Bothe was born in Havelberg on 8 July 1960, and died in Garsten on 21 September 2023, at the age of 63.

== Career ==
She started practicing athletics before turning to Handball in 1968 at her home town club in Havelberg. In 1974 she joined SC Magdeburg. In 1990 she joined TuS Walle Bremen. Here she won the 1994 EHF Cup Winners' Cup and several national titles. She left the club in 1997.

=== National team ===
She represented first East Germany and after the fall of the Berlin Wall, unified Germany team. At the 1982 and 1986 World Championships she finished 4th with East Germany.

At the 1993 World Championship she won gold medals with the unified Germany team. A year later she won silver medals at the inaugural European Championship at home soil.

In total she played 236 national team games for both german teams.

== Recognition ==
In 1984 she was awarded the DDR Patriotic Order of Merit in silver. In 1986 she was named DDR Handballer of the year.
