= Connie Mathisen =

Norwegian handball player

Personal information
- Born: April 6, 1976 (age 50)

Sport
- Sport: Handball

Youth career
- Years: Team
- -1993: Torp IL

Senior clubs
- Years: Team
- –: Skjeberg IL
- –: Byåsen HE
- -2004: Skjeberg IL
National team
Years	Team	Apps	(Gls)
1993	Norway	9	(5)
Medal record
Women's handball
World championship
Bronze medal – third place	1993 Norway	Team

Connie Mathisen (born 6 April 1976) is a Norwegian handball player. She played nine matches for the Norway women's national handball team in 1993. She participated at the 1993 World Women's Handball Championship, where the Norwegian team placed third. She did however not play a single minute at the tournament.

At club level she playeed for Byåsen HE and Skjeberg IL. She was the captain at Skjeberg IL. She left the club in 2004, after all players had been released from their contracts due to financial difficulties.
