= Monica Løken =

Norwegian handball player

Monica Kyvåg
Personal information
- Full name: Monica Angelsnes Kyvåg
- Nationality: Norwegian
- Born: 1967 (age 58–59)

Sport
- Sport: Handball
- Position: Goalkeeper

Senior clubs
- Years: Team
- –: Bækkelaget
National team
Years	Team	Apps	(Gls)
1994–1995	Norway	12	(0)
Medal record
Representing Norway
Women's handball
European championship
Bronze medal – third place	1994 Germany	Team

Monica Angelsnes Kyvåg (née Løken, born in 1967) is a Norwegian former handball player. She played twelve matches for the Norway women's national handball team in 1994 and 1995. She debuted for the Norwegian national team against Czech Republic in August 1994. She participated at the 1994 European Women's Handball Championship, where the Norwegian team placed third.

She is married to Norwegian handball coach Frode Kyvåg since 1995, and they have two kids.
