= Paloma Arranz =

Spanish handball player (born 1969)

Personal information
- Full name: Paloma Arranz Santamarta
- Nationality: Spanish
- Born: 15 August 1969 (age 57) Valladolid Spain

Sport
- Sport: Handball
National team
- Years: Team
- –: Spain

Paloma Arranz Santamarta (born 15 August 1969) is a Spanish team handball player who played for the Spanish national team. She was born in Valladolid. She competed at the 1992 Summer Olympics in Barcelona, where the Spanish team placed seventh.
