= Karen Heinrich =

German handball player (born 1968)

Personal information
- Nationality: German
- Born: 15 August 1968 (age 58) Staaken, East Germany
- Height: 1.87 m (6 ft 2 in)

Sport
- Sport: Handball
- Position: Left back

Senior clubs
- Years: Team
- 1985–1998: Frankfurter HC
National team
Years	Team		
–	East Germany		
–	Germany	64	(71)
Medal record
World Championship
Gold medal – first place	1993 Norway
Bronze medal – third place	1990 South Korea

Karen Heinrich (born 15 August 1968) is a German former handball player. She won the gold medal with German national team at the 1993 World Women's Handball Championship.

== Career ==
Heinrich is 1.87 meters tall and was primarily used in left back position. She started handball at BSG Motor Falkensee, then played for ASK Vorwärts Frankfurt and its successor clubs BFV Frankfurt and Frankfurter HC. In her 13-year long spell with Frankfurt, she was 3-time East German League and 2-time East German Cup champion and won the EHF Cup in 1990.

Heinrich was part of the World Champion Germany squad at the 1993 World Women's Handball Championship in Norway. She mainly used as an alternative, and played only in 3 of the 7 matches, scoring 3 goals, including the title-deciding goal at the end of the extra time in the final against Denmark. She represented East Germany before the German reunification and won a bronze medal at the 1990 World Women's Handball Championship where East Germany national team placed 3rd. Throughout her career, Heinrich played in combined total of 64 international matches for her national teams and scored 71 goals.

== Honours ==
=== National team ===
- World Championship:
  - Winner: 1993
  - Bronze Medalist: 1990

=== Clubs ===
- EHF Cup:
  - Winner: 1989/90
- East German Championship:
  - Winner: 1985/86, 1986/87, 1989/90
- East German Cup:
  - Winner: 1985/86, 1989/90
