= Susanne Boilesen =

Danish handball player (born 1970)

Personal information
- Born: 28 April 1970 (age 56) Levring, Denmark

Sport
- Sport: Handball
- Position: Back
- Current club: Retired

Senior clubs
- Years: Team
- 1990–1992: Horsens HK
- 1991–1992: Ikast fS
- 1993–1997: Viborg HK
- 1997–1998: TSV St. Otmar St. Gallen (Switzerland)
- 1999–2000: TTH Holstebro
National team
Years	Team	Apps	(Gls)
1994–1995	Denmark	7	(8)
Medal record
Representing Denmark
European Championship
Gold medal – first place	1994 Germany	Team

Susanne Boilesen (28 April 1970) is a Danish former Handball player. She was part of the team that won the 1994 European Women's Handball Championship; the first major international title, Denmark ever won.

== Merits ==
- 1994 European Women's Handball Championship Gold medals
- EHF Cup Winners' Cup 1997/98 Winner with TSV St. Otmar St. Gallen
