= Cordula David =

German handball player (born 1966)

Personal information
- Nationality: German
- Born: 13 February 1966 (age 60) Berlin, East Germany
- Height: 1.75 m (5 ft 9 in)

Sport
- Sport: Handball
- Position: Right back

Senior clubs
- Years: Team
- 1983–1990: TSC Berlin
- 1990–1993: TuS Walle Bremen
National team
- Years: Team
- –1990: East Germany
- 1990–1993: Germany
Medal record
World Championship
Gold medal – first place	1993 Norway

Cordula David (born 13 February 1966) is a German former handball player.

== National team ==
She won the gold medal with German national team at the 1993 World Women's Handball Championship in Norway. She played for East Germany national team before the German reunification and participated at the 1986 World Women's Handball Championship where East Germany placed 4th. She represented her national teams in combined total of 135 international matches.

== Club career ==
David was 1.75 meters tall right back player. In club level, she played for TSC Berlin in East Germany and won the 1985 East German Cup. She was the 2nd top goalscorer of the East German League in 1985/86 season with 108 goals and also led her team in goal-scoring in 1987/88 and 1988/89 seasons as well as the 1985/86 season. After the reunification, David moved to German Bundesliga club TuS Walle Bremen. She won two Bundesliga titles (1990/91, 1991/92) and one German Cup (1993) with Bremen.
