= Amaia Ugartamendía =

Spanish handball player (born 1966)

Personal information
- Full name: Amaia Ugartamendía Sagarzazu
- Nationality: Spanish
- Born: 9 June 1966 (age 60) Gipuzkoa Spain

Sport
- Sport: Handball
National team
- Years: Team
- –: Spain

Amaia Ugartamendía Sagarzazu (born 9 June 1966) is a Spanish team handball player who played for the club Ent. Pegaso and on the Spanish national team. She was born in Gipuzkoa. She competed at the 1992 Summer Olympics in Barcelona, where the Spanish team placed seventh.
