= Heike Axmann =

German handball player (born 1968)

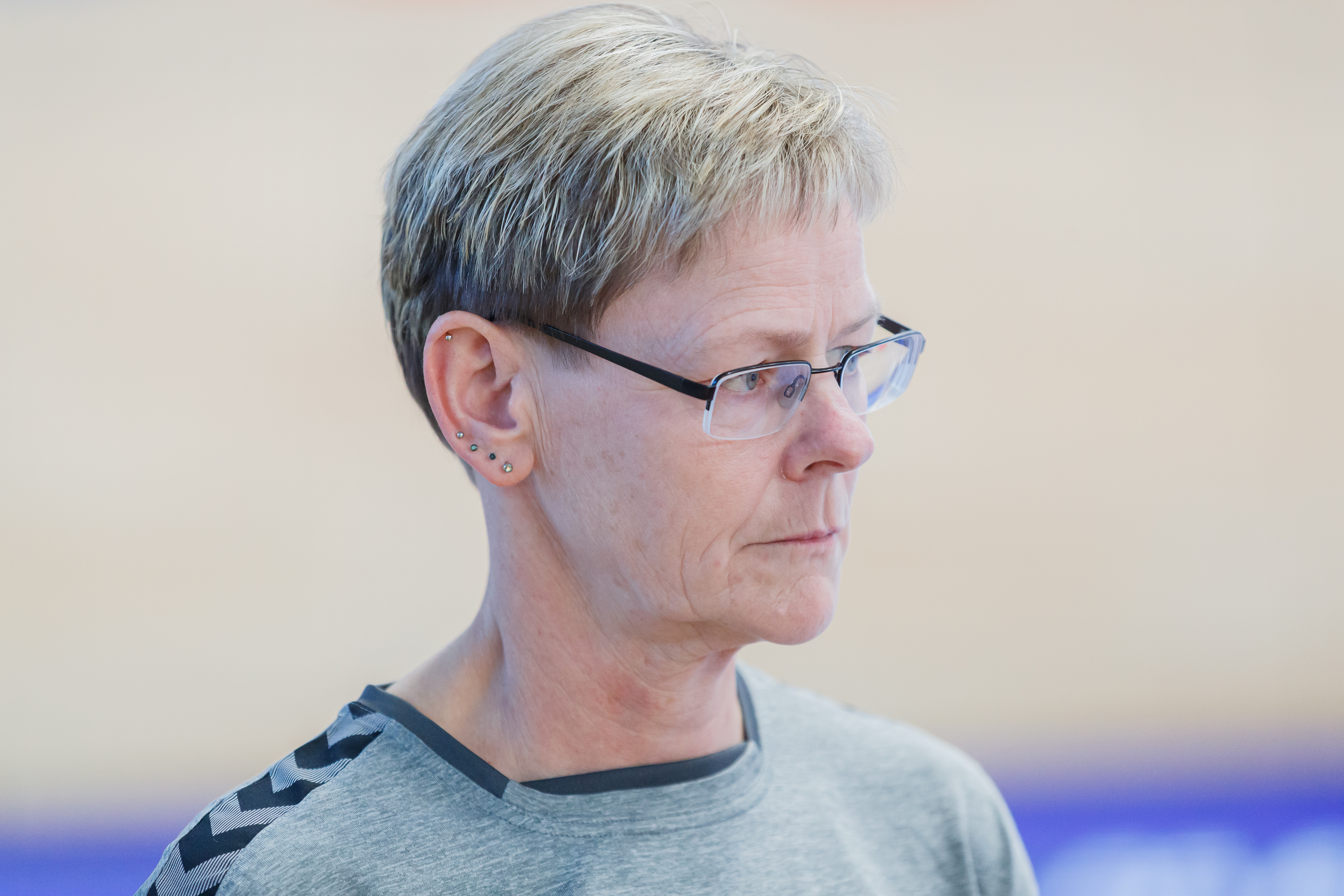
- 2022 as assistant coach

Personal information
- Nationality: German
- Born: December 4, 1968 (age 57) Wismar, East Germany

Sport
- Sport: Handball
- Position: Pivot

Youth career
- Years: Team
- 1979-1983: TSG Wismar

Senior clubs
- Years: Team
- 1983-1990: SC Empor Rostock
- 1990-1996: Buxtehuder SV
National team
Years	Team	Apps
–	East Germany	60
–	Germany	54

Teams managed
- 2004-2007: Buxtehuder SV
- 2014-2021: Buxtehuder SV (youth)
- 2021-2023: HL Buchholz 08-Rosengarten (assistent)
Medal record
Representing Germany
World Championship
Gold medal – first place	1993 Norway

Heike Axmann (née Dombrowski, 4 December 1968) is a German handball player. She was part of the team that won the 1993 World Championship.

== Career ==
Axmann represented first the East German and later the unified Germany national team. She played 114 games for the various German national tems, scoring 259 goals.

In 1989 she was named handballer of the year in East Germany. The same season she won the DDR-Championship with SC Empor Rostock. She also won the 1988 and 1989 DDR Handball Cup.

=== Coaching career ===
From 2004 to 2007 she coached the Buxtehuder SV. In 2014 she became the youth coach at the club. In 2016 while still coaching the youth team she also took over as the coach of the second team. From the 2022-23 season she became the assistant coach at HL Buchholz 08-Rosengarten.

== Private ==
Both of her children, Natalie and Dominik are professional handballers.
