= Tami Jameson =

American handball player (born 1968)

Personal information
- Nationality: American
- Born: April 13, 1968 (age 58) Minneapolis, Minnesota, United States

Sport
- Sport: Handball

Tami Jameson (born April 13, 1968) is an American former handball player. She competed in the women's tournament at the 1996 Summer Olympics. Her twin sister, Toni, also represented the American handball team at the same Olympics.
