= Jelšovce =

Village and municipality in Slovakia

Jelšovce Nyitraegerszeg
- Municipality
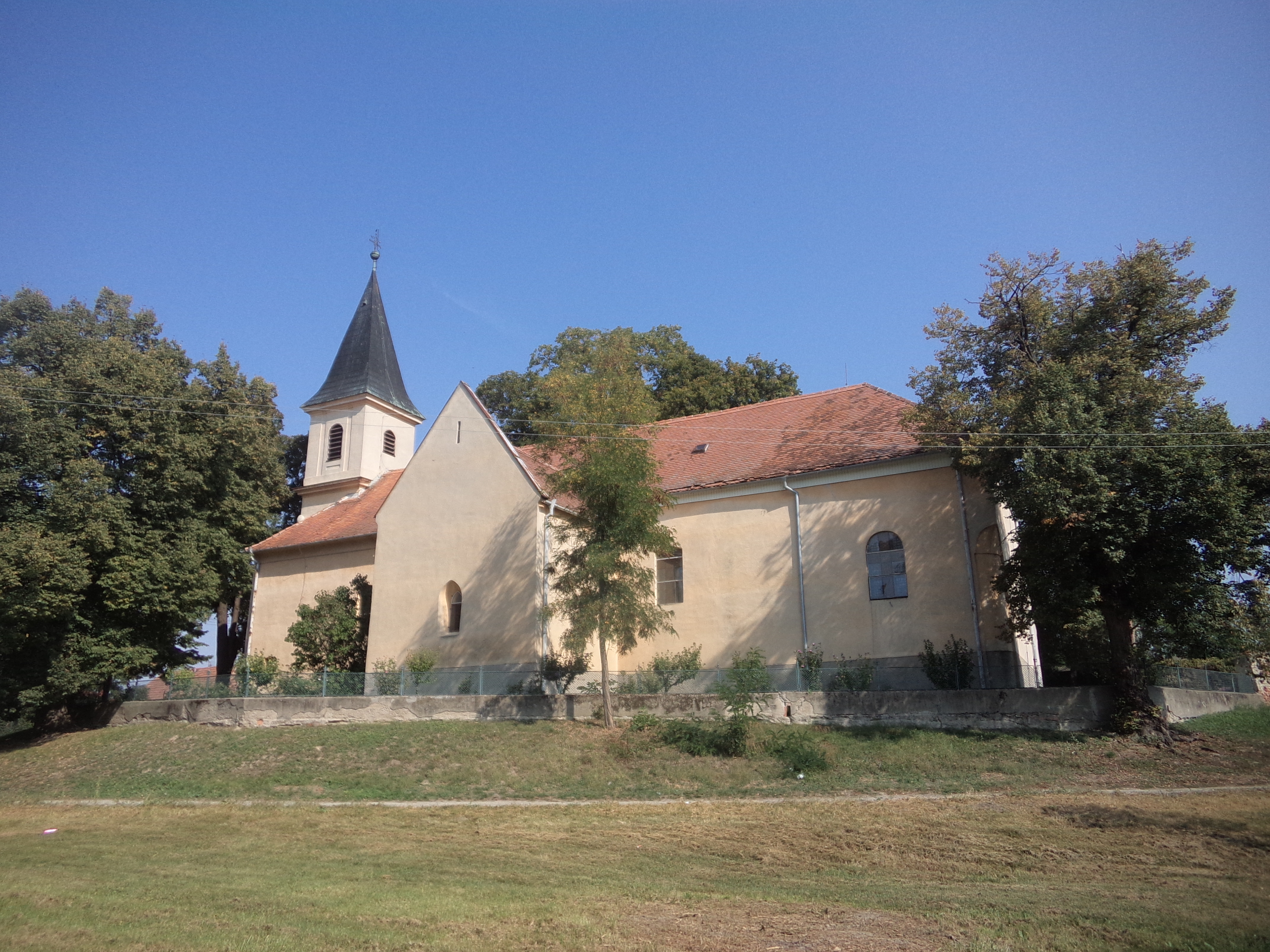

- Flag

- Location of Jelšovce in the Nitra Region Location of Jelšovce in Slovakia
- Coordinates: 48.40°N 18.07°E
- Country: Slovakia
- Region: Nitra Region
- District: Nitra District
- First mentioned: 1326

Area
  - Total: 10.44 km^{2} (4.03 sq mi)
- Elevation: 145 m (476 ft)

Population (2025)
  - Total: 962
- Time zone: UTC+1 (CET)
  - Summer (DST): UTC+2 (CEST)
- Postal code: 951 43
- Area code: +421 37
- Vehicle registration plate (until 2022): NR
- Website: www.jelsovce.sk

Jelšovce (Hungarian: Nyitraegerszeg) is a village and municipality in the Nitra District in western central Slovakia, in the Nitra Region.

== History ==
In historical records the village was first mentioned in 1326.

== Geography ==
The municipality lies at an altitude of 145 metres (476 ft) and covers an area of 10.44 km^{2} (4.03 sq mi) (2025).

== Population ==
Population statistic (10 years)
Year	1995	2005	2015	2025
Count	975	957	1009	962
Difference		−1.84%	+5.43%	−4.65%

Population statistic
Year	2024	2025
Count	985	962
Difference		−2.33%

It has a population of 962 people (31 December 2025).

=== Ethnicity ===
Census 2021 (1+ %)
Ethnicity	Number	Fraction
Slovak	935	94.63%
Not found out	39	3.94%
Hungarian	29	2.93%
Romani	14	1.41%
Total	988	

In year 2021 was 988 people by ethnicity 935 as Slovak, 39 as Not found out, 29 as Hungarian, 14 as Romani, 9 as Czech, 1 as Jewish, 1 as Polish, 1 as Moravian, 1 as Other and 1 as English.

Note on population: The difference values of population numbers in the table "Population statistic" and in the sections "Ethnicity" & "Religion" is caused by the use of various statistical methods.

=== Religion ===
Census 2021 (1+ %)
Religion	Number	Fraction
Roman Catholic Church	726	73.48%
None	178	18.02%
Not found out	44	4.45%
Evangelical Church	11	1.11%
Greek Catholic Church	10	1.01%
Total	988	

In year 2021 was 988 people by religion 726 from Roman Catholic Church, 178 from None, 44 from Not found out, 11 from Evangelical Church, 10 from Greek Catholic Church, 6 from Christian Congregations in Slovakia, 3 from Calvinist Church, 2 from Eastern Orthodox Church, 2 from Jehovah's Witnesses, 2 from Seventh-day Adventist Church, 2 from Ad hoc movements, 1 from Islam and 1 from Other.

== Facilities ==
The village has a public library a gym and football pitch.

== See also ==
- List of municipalities and towns in Slovakia

== Genealogical resources ==
The records for genealogical research are available at the state archive "Statny Archiv in Nitra, Slovakia"

- Roman Catholic church records (births/marriages/deaths): 1747-1913 (parish A)
