= Zhang Li (handballer) =

Chinese handball player (born 1976)

Zhang Li (simplified Chinese: 张丽; traditional Chinese: 張麗; pinyin: Zhāng Lì; born October 4, 1976, in Beijing) is a female Chinese handball player who competed in the 1996 Summer Olympics and in the 2004 Summer Olympics.

In 1996, she finished fifth with the Chinese team in the women's competition. She played all four matches and scored nine goals.

Eight years later, she was a member of the Chinese team, which finished eighth in the women's competition. She played six matches and scored ten goals.
