= Hege Kvitsand =

Norwegian handball player (born 1973)

Personal information
- Nationality: Norwegian
- Born: 14 June 1973 (age 53) Trondheim, Norway

Sport
- Sport: Handball
- Position: Pivot

Senior clubs
- Years: Team
- -1993: Sjetne IL
- 1993-1998: Bækkelagets SK
- 1998-1999: GOG
- 1999-?: Byåsen
National team
Years	Team	Apps	(Gls)
1991–1997	Norway	145	(197)
Medal record
Representing Norway
World Championship
Silver medal – second place	1997 Germany	Team
Bronze medal – third place	1993 Norway	Team
European Championship
Bronze medal – third place	1994 Germany	Team

Hege Kristine Kvitsand (born 14 June 1973) is a Norwegian handball player who played for the club Bækkelagets SK and the Norwegian national team in the 1990s. She was born in Trondheim. She competed at the 1996 Summer Olympics in Atlanta, where the Norwegian team finished fourth.

She won a bronze medal with the Norwegian team at the 1993 World Women's Handball Championship, a bronze medal at the 1994 European Women's Handball Championship, and a silver medal at the 1997 World Women's Handball Championship.

Kvitsand was awarded the Håndballstatuetten trophy from the Norwegian Handball Federation in 2013.
