= Gabriele Palme =

German handball player (born 1964)

Personal information
- Nationality: German
- Born: 1964-04-26 Staßfurt, Saxony-Anhalt
- Height: 179 cm (70 in)

Sport
- Sport: Handball
- Position: Left wing

Youth career
- Years: Team
- 1970-1983: SV Traktor Förderstedt

Senior clubs
- Years: Team
- 1983-1985: Pädagogische Hochschule Magdeburg
- 1985-1995: SC Magdeburg
National team
Years	Team	Apps
?-1990	East Germany	109
1990-?	Germany	
Medal record
Representing East Germany
World Championship
Bronze medal – third place	1990 South Korea
Representing Germany
World Championship
Gold medal – first place	1993 Norway

Gabriele Palme (born 26 April 1964) is a German handball player. She won the 1993 World Championship. She also participated at the 1992 Summer Olympics, where the German national team placed fourth.

== Career ==
Palme started played handball at age 6. From 1970 to 1983 she played for SV Traktor Förderstedt, after which she joined the student team of the Magdeburg Pedagogical School, where she played in the second tier of East German handball. In 1985 she joined SC Magdeburg in the top league. After the fall of the Berlin Wall she continued playing for the club in the Handball-Bundesliga Frauen. She retired in April 1995.

=== National team ===
She debuted for the East German national team in 1986. She played 109 matches for them, including at the 1990 World Championship, where she won bronze medals.

Afterwards she represented the unified German national team. First at the 1992 Olympics, where the team finished 4th. In 1993 she won the 1993 World Championship.

== Post-playing career ==
After her playing days she has worked as a teacher.
