= Begoña Sánchez =

Spanish handball player (born 1969)

Personal information
- Full name: Begoña Sánchez Santos
- Nationality: Spanish
- Born: 26 June 1969 (age 57) Madrid Spain

Sport
- Sport: Handball
National team
Years	Team	Apps	(Gls)
–	Spain	138	(191)

Begoña Sánchez Santos (born 26 June 1969) is a Spanish team handball player who played for the Spanish national team. She was born in Madrid. She competed at the 1992 Summer Olympics in Barcelona, where the Spanish team placed seventh.
