= Desanka Stojanović =

Yugoslav handball player

Personal information
- Nationality: Yugoslav
- Born: 29 June 1962 (age 63)

Sport
- Sport: Handball

Desanka Stojanović (born 29 June 1962) is a Yugoslav handball player. She competed in the women's tournament at the 1988 Summer Olympics.
