= Júlia Kolečániová =

Slovak handball player (born 1965)

Personal information
- Nationality: Slovak
- Born: 1 December 1965 (age 60) Handlová, Czechoslovakia

Sport
- Sport: Handball

Júlia Kolečániová (born 1 December 1965) is a Slovak handball player who competed in the women's tournament at the 1988 Summer Olympics.
