= Lisa Eagen =

American handball player

Personal information
- Nationality: American
- Born: 1 March 1971 (age 54)

Sport
- Sport: Handball

Lisa Eagen (born March 1, 1971) is a retired American team handball athlete. She participated in the 1996 Summer Olympics in Atlanta, Georgia.

Eagen is an exercise physiologist at Shepherd Center.

Eagen has been an assistant coach for the USA Team Handball Wheelchair National Team since 2024.
