= Gabriela Sabadošová =

Slovak handball player (born 1958)

Personal information
- Nationality: Slovak
- Born: 29 October 1958 (age 67) Jelšovce, Czechoslovakia

Sport
- Sport: Handball

Gabriela Sabadošová (born 29 October 1958) is a Slovak handball player. She competed in the women's tournament at the 1988 Summer Olympics.
