= Angie Raynor =

American handball player

Personal information
- Nationality: American
- Born: 21 May 1967 (age 58)

Sport
- Sport: Handball

Angie Raynor (born May 21, 1967) is an American former handball player who competed in the 1988 Summer Olympics and in the 1992 Summer Olympics.
