= Csilla Elekes =

German handball player (born 1964)

Personal information
- Nationality: German/Hungarian
- Born: 18 June 1964 (age 62) Budapest, Hungary
- Height: 176 cm (69 in)

Sport
- Sport: Handball
- Position: Pivot
National team
Years	Team	Apps	(Gls)
1982-1989	Hungary	144	(373)
–	Germany	54	(101)
Medal record
European Championship
Silver medal – second place	1994 Germany

Csilla Elekes (born 18 June 1964) is a Hungarian-German for handball player, who played both for the German national team and the Hungarian national team. Representing Germany, she won silver medals at the 1994 European Women's Handball Championship. She also competed in the women's tournament at the 1996 Summer Olympics. In 1998 she won the EHF Champions League with Hypo Niederösterreich.
