= Zhang Limei =

Chinese handball player (born 1969)

Personal information
- Nationality: Chinese
- Born: 16 December 1969 (age 56)

Sport
- Sport: Handball

Zhang Limei (born 16 December 1969) is a Chinese handball player. She competed in the women's tournament at the 1996 Summer Olympics.
