= Tina Bøttzau =

Danish handball player (born 1971)

Personal information
- Full name: Tina Bøttzau Nielsen
- Nickname: Bøtte
- Nationality: Danish
- Born: 29 August 1971 (age 55) Kolding, Denmark
- Height: 174 cm (69 in)

Sport
- Sport: Handball
- Position: Right Back

Youth career
- Years: Team
- 1985-1989: KIF Kolding

Senior clubs
- Years: Team
- 1989-1991: KIF Kolding
- 1991-1995: IK Skovbakken
- 1995-1997: GOG
- 1997-2001: IK Skovbakken
National team
Years	Team	Apps	(Gls)
1990-2000	Denmark	120	(247)

Teams managed
- 2024-: Denmark women (team manager)
Medal record
Women's handball
Representing Denmark
Olympic Games
Gold medal – first place	1996 Atlanta	Team
Gold medal – first place	2000 Sydney	Team
World Championships
Silver medal – second place	1993 Norway
Bronze medal – third place	1995 Austria and Hungary
Gold medal – first place	1997 Germany
European Championship
Gold medal – first place	1996 Denmark	Team

Tina Bøttzau (born 29 August 1971) is a Danish former team handball player, two times Olympic champion and a World champion. She received gold medals with the Danish national team at the 1996 Summer Olympics in Atlanta and at the 2000 Summer Olympics in Sydney, and at the 1997 World championship.

After her handball career, she has worked as a teacher. Today she is the team manager of the Denmark women's national handball team.
