= Jadranka Jež =

Austrian handball player (born 1960)

Personal information
- Nationality: Yugoslav, Austrian
- Born: 9 November 1960 (age 65)

Sport
- Sport: Handball
- Position: Line player

Senior clubs
- Years: Team
- -1985: RK Lokomotiva Zagreb
- 1985-199.: Hypo Niederösterreich
- 199.-: WAT Fünfhaus
- 1995-: Karbon Zaprešić
National team
Years	Team		

Jadranka Jež, also named Jadranka Požgajčić (born 9 November 1960) is a Yugoslavian and Austrian handball player.

With Yugoslavia, she had won a bronze medal at the 1982 World Championship. But for the 1984 Olympic Games, the Yugoslavian coach Josip Samaržija chose to select Emilija Erčić and Svetlana Mugoša instead Jež as line player and consequently Jež very quickly decided to play for the Austrian national team At club level Jež then played with RK Lokomotiva Zagreb. Although she already played for Austria, she still played for Lokomotiva in the Yugoslav Championship for one season, and then decided to join Hypo Niederösterreich at the request of Vinko Kandija, the Yugoslavian coach of that team at the time.

With Austria, she hence competed at the 1986 and the 1990 World Championships and at the 1992 Summer Olympics, where Austria placed fifth. In total, Jez played 189 international matches and scored 384 goals for Austria.

At club level she played with Hypo Niederösterreich where she won the European Champions Cup in 1990 but also lost in finale in 1987 and in 1991. At least from 1992 she finally played for Austrian challenger WAT Fünfhaus.

She returned to Zagreb in 1995, when his son was four years old because his husband fell seriously ill. At the time, she played for Karbon Zaprešić, with whom she entered the First League. After a short episode in Lokomotiva, she returned to Zaprešić where she ended her career.
