= Heike Murrweiss =

German handball player (born 1966)

Personal information
- Nationality: German
- Born: 1 January 1966 (age 60) Heilbronn, West Germany
- Height: 173 cm (68 in)

Sport
- Sport: Handball
- Position: Left wing

Senior clubs
- Years: Team
- –: TG Heilbronn
- –: VfL Neckargartach
- –: VfL Sindelfingen
- –: PSV Grünweiß Frankfurt
- –: TV Lützellinden
National team
Years	Team	Apps
1993-1996	Germany	72
Medal record
World Championship
Gold medal – first place	1993 Norway
European Championship
Silver medal – second place	1994 Germany

Heike Reinhardt (née Heike Murrweiss born 1 January 1966) is a German former handball player. She is a world champion from the 1993 World Championship. She also competed in the women's tournament at the 1996 Summer Olympics. She was known as a defensively solid player.

== Career ==
At club level she played for TG Heilbronn, VfL Neckargartach, VfL Sindelfingen and Grün-Weiß Frankfurt. In 1993 she joined TV Lützellinden. Here she won the 1992-93 German Championship and EHF Cup Winners' Cup.

=== National team ===
She played 10 matches for the German youth national team. In March 1993 she made her debut for the Germany senior team. Later the same year she won the 1993 World Championship.

In 1994 she won silver medals at the inaugural European Championship, losing to Denmark in the final.

== Post-playing career ==
After her playing days she worked as a banker.
