= Michaela Schanze =

German handball player (born 1973)

Personal information
- Nationality: Germany
- Born: 30 March 1973 (age 53) Zwickau, East Germany
- Height: 187 cm (74 in)

Sport
- Sport: Handball
- Position: Goalkeeper

Senior clubs
- Years: Team
- 1986-2002: VfB Leipzig
- 2002-2005: SV Union Halle-Neustadt
- 2005-2009: Thüringer HC
- –: Schlotheimer SV
National team
| Years | Team | Apps | (Gls) |
| – | Germany | 129 | (0) |
Medal record
World Championship
| Gold medal – first place | 1993 Norway |

Michaela Schanze (born 30 March 1973) is a German female handball player and coach. She was a member of the Germany women's national handball team that won the 1993 World Championship. She was also part of the team at the 1996 Summer Olympics, playing two matches. On club level she played for VfB Leipzig in Leipzig, SV Union Halle-Neustadt and Thüringer HC. Lastly she played for Schlotheimer SV in the lower leagues.

From 2012 she has coached the youth team at Thüringer HC.
