= Dannette Leininger =

American handball player

Personal information
- Full name: Dannette Martin Leininger
- Nationality: American
- Born: 6 June 1963 (age 63)

Sport
- Sport: Handball

Dannette Martin Leininger (born June 6, 1963) is an American former handball player who competed in the 1992 Summer Olympics and in the 1996 Summer Olympics.

Leininger was born on June 6, 1963. She graduated from Thomas Jefferson High School in Bloomington, Minnesota, and was inducted into the school's hall of fame in 2009. Leininger then attended the University of Minnesota, where she earned a degree in secondary education. Leininger played collegiate softball at UM, and was inducted into the school's Softball Hall of Fame.

Leininger was a member of the United States women's national handball team and appeared in the 1992 Summer Olympics. She resigned from her positions as a teacher at Beamount Middle School and fastpitch softball coach at Saint Cloud High School in 1994 to train for the 1995 Pan American Games and 1996 Summer Olympics. At the 1995 Pan Am Games, the women's national handballers won a gold medal. During the 1996 Olympics, however, the United States finished last in the women's handball tournament.

Following the end of her competitive career, Leininger remained with United States Team Handball Federation in an administrative capacity through 2006. She then worked for the YMCA of Greater Boston. By January 2008, Leininger moved to New York City to join the municipal Department of Parks and Recreation, and also to manage the Al Oerter Recreation Center and Flushing Meadows Corona Aquatics Center. In January 2012, Leininger was appointed deputy chief of recreation for Manhattan.
