= Kristen Danihy =

American handball player

Personal information
- Born: January 27, 1969 (age 56) Lawton, Oklahoma, United States

Sport
- Sport: Handball

Kristen Danihy (born January 27, 1969) is an American former handball player. She competed in the women's tournament at the 1996 Summer Olympics.
