= Carola Ciszewski =

German handball player (born 1968)

Personal information
- Nationality: German
- Born: June 1, 1968 (age 58) Merseburg, East Germany
- Height: 179 cm (70 in)

Sport
- Sport: Handball

Youth career
- Years: Team
- 1979-1981: BSG Wismut Schneeberg
- –: SC Leipzig

Senior clubs
- Years: Team
- 1981-1993: SC Leipzig
- 1993-1999: VfB Leipzig
- 1999-2008: HC Leipzig
National team
- Years: Team
- ?-1990: East Germany
- 1990-?: Germany
Medal record
Representing East Germany
World Championship
Bronze medal – third place	1990 South Korea
Representing Germany
World Championship
Gold medal – first place	1993 Norway
European Championship
Silver medal – second place	1994 Germany

Carola Ciszewski (born 1 June 1968 in Merseburg, DDR) is a German handball player, won the 1993 World Championship. She also participated at the 1992 Summer Olympics, where the German national team placed fourth.

== Career ==
Carola Ciszewski started playing handball at BSG Wismut Schneeberg, before joining SC Leipzig in 1981 at the age of 13. Here she played in the top division in East Germany and later in the Handball-Bundesliga Frauen after the fall of the Berlin Wall. Here she won the EHF European League twice in 1985-86 and 1991-92. She also won the DDR Championship in 1987-88 and in 1990-91, the last edition of the tournament. She won the United Germany Championship twice in a row in 1997-98 and 1998-99.

=== National team ===
Ciszewski played for both the East Germany and the Unified Germany national teams. With East Germany she played at the 1990 World Championship in South Korea, where she won bronze medals.

With the Unified Germany national team, she won the 1993 World Championship.
