= Annette Skotvoll =

Norwegian handball player (born 1968)

Personal information
- Born: 1 September 1968 (age 58) Trondheim, Norway
- Height: 176 cm (69 in)

Sport
- Sport: Handball
- Position: Goalkeeper

Senior clubs
- Years: Team
- –: Sjetne IL
- –: Byåsen IL
National team
- Years: Team
- –: Norway
Medal record
Representing Norway
Women's handball
Olympic Games
Silver medal – second place	1988 Seoul	Team
Silver medal – second place	1992 Barcelona	Team
World Championship
Bronze medal – third place	1993 Norway	Team
European Championship
Silver medal – second place	1996 Denmark	Team
Bronze medal – third place	1994 Germany	Team

Annette Skotvoll (born 1 September 1968 in Trondheim) is a Norwegian team handball player (goalkeeper) and Olympic medalist.

== Life and career ==
Born in Trondheim on 1 September 1968, Skotvoll played as goalkeeper for the clubs Sjetne IL and Byåsen IL.

She received silver medals at the 1988 Summer Olympics in Seoul with the Norwegian national team, and at the 1992 Summer Olympics in Barcelona.

She won a bronze medal with the Norwegian team at the 1993 World Women's Handball Championship, bronze medal at the 1994 European Women's Handball Championship, and silver medal at the 1996 European Women's Handball Championship.

Skotvoll played 250 games for the national team during her career.

She was awarded the Håndballstatuetten trophy from the Norwegian Handball Federation in 2012.
