= Li Jianfang =

Chinese handball player (born 1972)

Personal information
- Nationality: Chinese
- Born: 16 February 1972 (age 53)

Sport
- Sport: Handball

Li Jianfang (born 16 February 1972) is a Chinese handball player. She competed in the women's tournament at the 1996 Summer Olympics.
