= Sybille Gruner =

German handball player (born 1969)

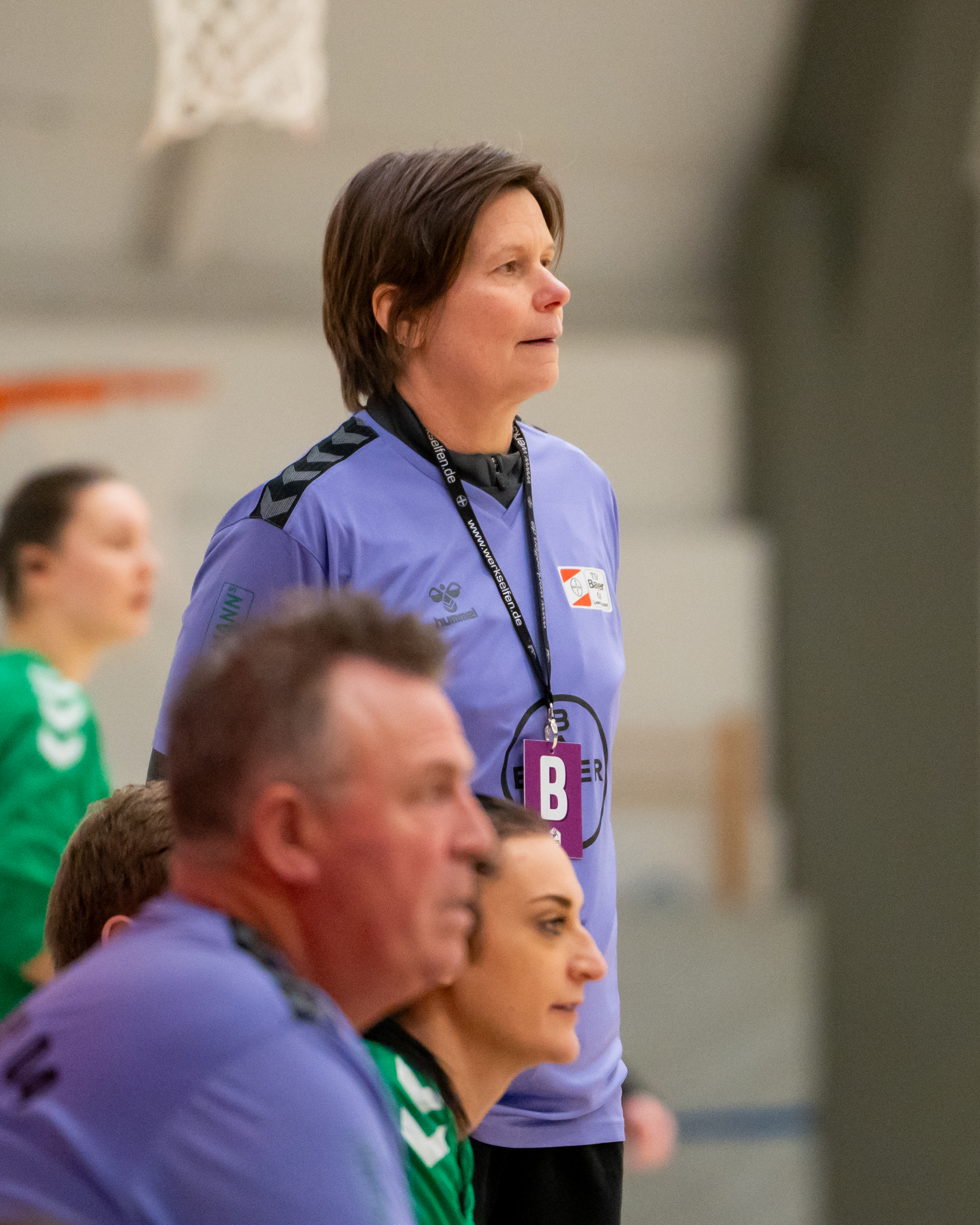

Personal information
- Nationality: German
- Born: May 18, 1969 (age 57) Erfurt, East Germany

Sport
- Sport: Handball
- Position: Centre back

Senior clubs
- Years: Team
- 1979-1983: UT Erfurt
- 1983-1990: SC Leipzig
- 1990-2002: Bayer 04 Leverkusen
National team
| Years | Team | Apps | (Gls) |
| – | Germany | 135 | (296) |

Teams managed
- 2002-2006: Bayer 04 Leverkusen (assistant)
- 2013-2018: Bayer 04 Leverkusen youth team
- 2018-: TuS Königsdorf
- 2020-2021: Germany U17
Medal record
Representing Germany
World Championship
| Gold medal – first place | 1993 Norway |
European Championship
| Silver medal – second place | 1994 Germany |

Sybille Gruner (born 18 May 1969 in Erfurt, East Germany) was a member of the German women's national handball team between 1989 and 1995. In 1993 the team won the world championship in a very close game against Denmark. One year later, during the European championship final in Berlin, they played the Danish team again and lost.

At the Olympic Games in Barcelona in 1992 the team had high hopes of a medal but placed a disappointing fourth. In the play-off for the bronze medal they lost against the odds-on favourite, Russia.

== Club career ==
Gruner attended Kinder- und Jugendsportschule in Leipzig, a special school for athletically talented children. At the age of 14 she moved to SC Leipzig. At the age of 16 she was a member of the senior SC Leipzig team that won the European cup. She has also won several national titles with SC Leipzig followed.

In 1990 she moved to Leverkusen and played for Bayer 04 Leverkusen for the next 12 years. After the birth of her first daughter and winning the national cup she ended her active career as a handball player.

== National team ==
She played 133 national team games for the German national team.

== Coaching career ==
For the next 3 years following her retirement she worked as assistant coach at Bayer 04 Leverkusen and, after the birth of her second daughter in 2004, she returned for another year to the coaching bench. In 2013 she became the coach of the Bayer 04 Leverkusen youth team. In April 2018 she became the youth coach at TuS Königsdorf.

From October 2020 to December 2021 she coached the German U17 team.

== Private life ==
Since 2006 she has been working for TNT Innight. She married the former basketball player Bodo Kuczmann in 2004.
