= Jennifer Demby-Horton =

American handball player

Personal information
- Nationality: American
- Born: August 10, 1968 (age 57)

Sport
- Sport: Handball
- University team: UMass Lowell (basketball)
Medal record
Women's handball
Representing United States
Pan American Games
Gold medal – first place	1995 Mar del Plata	Team

Jennifer Demby-Horton (born August 10, 1968) is an American former handball player. She competed in the women's tournament at the 1996 Summer Olympics.

A graduate of the University of Massachusetts Lowell, Demby-Horton played on the women's basketball team that won the 1990 Eastern College Athletic Conference women's basketball tournament.
