= Dawn Marple =

American handball player (born 1970)

Dawn Marple (born November 1, 1970) is an American former handball player. She competed in the women's tournament at the 1996 Summer Olympics. In high school, she played basketball and did long jump, before going to university and playing handball. She won a gold medal with the USA at the 1995 Pan American Games. She later married a Danish woman and settled in Denmark.
