= Rikke Solberg =

Danish handball player (born 1971)

Personal information
- Full name: Rikke Dalsager
- Nationality: Danish
- Born: 6 February 1971 (age 55) Silkeborg, Denmark

Sport
- Sport: Handball
- Position: Centre back

Senior clubs
- Years: Team
- 1990-1991: Brabrand
- 1991-1994: Lunner
- 1994-1997: GOG Håndbold
- 1997-1998: Viborg HK
- 1999-2001: Århus HK
- 2001-2002: Viborg HK
National team
Years	Team	Apps	(Gls)
1991-1996	Denmark	84	(185)
Medal record
World Championship
Silver medal – second place	1993 Norway
Bronze medal – third place	1995 Austria/Hungary
European Championship
Gold medal – first place	1994 Germany

Rikke Dalsager (née Solberg; born 6 February 1971) is a Danish former handball player, who was a part of the Danish team that won the 1994 European Championship.

She was also part of the Danish team that won silver medals at the 1993 World Championship; the first time Denmark won medals since 1962, and the beginning of the 1990s 'Iron Ladies' golden generation. Denmark lost the final 21–22 to Germany.

Her national team career was cut short due to injuries, and she missed the 1996 Olympics. She had to watch her teammates win Olympics gold medals from a wheelchair. Her injuries earned her the nickname 'Denmark's unluckiest handball lady'.

At club level she started at Brabrand IF in Aarhus, before moving to Norwegian Lunner IL, followed by GOG Håndbold and Viborg HK. Here she won the EHF Cup in 1998; the second in Viborg HK's history. In 1999 she won the Danish Championship with Viborg HK. She then had to retire due to injuries. In 2000 she unretired to join Århus HK in the Danish lower leagues, while simultaneously working in her own clothing store. When Århus HK went bankrupt, she joined the Århus based club Skovbakken. She retired from handball in 2002.

== Post-playing career ==
After her playing career, she has had her own clothing store in Århus named 'Rikke Solberg'.
