= Elisa Peres =

Angolan handball player

Personal information
- Nationality: Angolan
- Born: 17 November 1963 (age 62)

Sport
- Sport: Handball
National team
- Years: Team
- –: Angola
Medal record
African Championship
Gold medal – first place	1989 Algeria

Elisa Peres (born 17 November 1963) is an Angolan handball player.

She competed at the 1996 Summer Olympics, where Angola placed 7th.
