= Anabela Joaquim =

Angolan handball player

Personal information
- Nationality: Angolan
- Born: 5 May 1967 (age 59)

Sport
- Sport: Handball
National team
- Years: Team
- –: Angola
Medal record
African Championship
Gold medal – first place	1989 Algeria

Anabela Joaquim (born 5 May 1967) is an Angolan handball player.

She competed at the 1996 Summer Olympics, where Angola placed 7th.
