= Cristina Dogaru-Cucuian =

Romanian handball player (born 1971)

Personal information
- Full name: Cristina Maria Dogaru-Cucuian
- Nationality: Romanian
- Born: December 28, 1971 (age 54) Râmnicu Vâlcea, Romania
- Height: 1.74 m (5 ft 9 in)
- Weight: 58 kg (128 lb)

Sport
- Sport: Handball
- Position: Goalkeeper
- Current club: Retired

Youth career
- Years: Team
- 1984–: CSȘ Râmnicu Vâlcea
- –1990: Chimia Râmnicu Vâlcea

Senior clubs
- Years: Team
- 1990–1995: Chimistul Râmnicu Vâlcea
- 1995–1996: Universitatea Cluj
- 1996–1997: RK Krim Electa
- 1997–1998: Podravka Koprivnica
- 1998–1999: Universitatea Cluj
- 1999–2003: Rapid București
- 2003–2005: Rapid CFR București
- 2005–2008: U Jolidon Cluj
National team
Years	Team	Apps	(Gls)
1988–	Romania	115	(0)

Cristina Dogaru-Cucuian (born 28 December 1971) is a Romanian handball player. She competed in the women's tournament at the 2000 Summer Olympics.
