= Luzia Bezerra =

Angolan handball player

Luzia María Bezerra
Personal information
- Nationality: Angolan
- Born: 23 May 1968 (age 58)

Sport
- Sport: Handball
National team
- Years: Team
- –: Angola
Medal record
African Championship
Gold medal – first place	1989 Algeria

Luzia Maria Bezerra (born 23 May 1968) is an Angolan handball player.

She competed at the 1996 Summer Olympics, where Angola placed 7th.
