= Conny Hamann =

Danish handball player (born 1969)

Personal information
- Full name: Conny Hamann-Boeriths
- Nationality: Danish
- Born: 16 September 1969 (age 57) Sønderborg, Denmark

Sport
- Sport: Handball
- Position: Playmaker

Senior clubs
- Years: Team
- 1989–1990: Horsens HK
- 1990–1997: GOG Håndbold
- 1997–2000: Bayer Leverkusen (Germany)
- 1999–2001: GOG Håndbold
National team
Years	Team	Apps	(Gls)
1989–1996	Denmark	70	(158)
Medal record
Women's handball
Representing Denmark
Olympic Games
Gold medal – first place	1996 Atlanta	Team competition
World Championships
Silver medal – second place	1993 Norway
Bronze medal – third place	1995 Austria and Hungary
European Championship
Gold medal – first place	1994 Germany

Conny Hamann (born 16 September 1969) is a Danish former team handball player and Olympic champion. She received a gold medal with the Danish national team at the 1996 Summer Olympics in Atlanta. Additionally she also won the European Championship in 1994 with the Danish national team; the first title Denmark ever won.

In her last playing season, she was awarded the MVP award in the Danish Women's Handball Cup. After ending her playing career in 2001, she has worked as a teacher. She is married to fellow handballer René Hamann-Boeriths. Their son Oliver Hamann-Boeriths is also a professional handball player.
