= Gitte Madsen =

Danish handball player (born 1969)

Personal information
- Full name: Gitte Madsen
- Nationality: Danish
- Born: 24 March 1969 (age 57) Herning, Denmark
- Height: 174 cm (69 in)

Sport
- Sport: Handball
- Position: Multiple Positions

Senior clubs
- Years: Team
- 1990–1991: Horsens HK (Denmark)
- 1991–1995: Bækkelagets SK (Norway)
- 1995–1997: DHG Odense (Denmark)
- 1997–1998: GOG (Denmark)
- 1998–2000: Bækkelagets SK (Norway)
National team
Years	Team	Apps	(Gls)
1991–1998	Denmark	120	(288)

Teams managed
- 2019–2022: Norway U-18
Medal record
Women's handball
Representing Denmark
Olympic Games
Gold medal – first place	1996 Atlanta	Team competition
World Championship
Silver medal – second place	1993 Norway
Bronze medal – third place	1995 Austria and Hungary
Gold medal – first place	1997 Germany	Team
European Championship
Gold medal – first place	1996 Denmark	Team

Gitte Madsen (born 24 March 1969) is a Danish retired team handball player and Olympic champion. She received a gold medal with the Danish national team at the 1996 Summer Olympics in Atlanta. With the Danish national team, she has also won both the World Championship and European Championship.

== Club career ==
Madsen played for Horsens HK until 1991. In her last season at the club, in 1990–91 she was the top scorer in the Danish league. For the 1991–92 she switched to Norwegian club Bækkelagets SK where she played for 3 years. Here she won the Norwegian league in 1992 and in 1994 with the club.

In 1994 she returned to Danish handball to play for first DHG Håndbold followed by GOG Håndbold. She returned as the last stop of her career to Bækkelagets SK, where she won the EHF Cup Winners' Cup in 1998 as well as her third Norwegian league title. Her career ended in 2000 after suffering three separate Spinal disc herniations within 6 months.

== Coaching career ==
From 2019 to 2022 she acted as the Norwegian U-18 coach together with Kristine Lunde.
