= Bianca Urbanke =

German handball player (born 1967)

Personal information
- Full name: Bianca Urbanke-Rösicke
- Nationality: German
- Born: September 17, 1967 (age 59) Ludwigsfelde, East Germany
- Height: 179 cm (70 in)

Sport
- Sport: Handball
- Position: Right back

Youth career
- Years: Team
- 1974-1980: BSG Lok Rangsdorf
- 1980-1985: ASK Vorwärts Frankfurt

Senior clubs
- Years: Team
- 1985-1990: ASK Vorwärts Frankfurt
- 1990-1993: Bayer Leverkusen
- 1993-1994: TV Lützellinden
- 1994-1999: Frankfurter HC
- 1999-2001: Ferrobus Mislata
- 2001-2004: Frankfurter HC
- 2005: Thüringer HC
National team
Years	Team		
1987-1990	East Germany		
1990-1997	Germany	207	(775)
Medal record
Representing Germany
World Championship
Gold medal – first place	1993 Norway
European Championship
Silver medal – second place	1994 Germany

Bianca Urbanke-Rösicke (born 17 September 1967) is a German handball player. She was a part of the German team that won the 1993 World Women's Handball Championship. She also participated at the 1992 Summer Olympics, where the German national team placed fourth.

== Career ==
Bianca Urbanke started playing handball aged 6 at BSG Lok Rangsdorf. In 1980 she joined the Kinder- und Jugendsportschule, which had a connection to ASK Vorwärts Frankfurt, one of the strongest teams in DDR in the 1980's. She joined ASK Vorwärts Frankfurt at the age of 15.

From the 1985-86 season she played in the first team, where she played together with Silke Fittinger and Katrin Krüger. She won three DDR-championships with the club.

After the fall of the Berlin Wall she joined Bayer Leverkusen. Here she won the 1990-91 DHB-Pokal.

In 1993 she joined reigning champions TV Lützellinden for a single season, before rejoining Frankfurter HC. With Lützellinden she finished second in the Bundesliga.

In 1999 she joined Spanish team Ferrobus Mislata. Here she won the EHF Cup and the Spanish Cup.

In 2001 she returned to Germany and Frankfurter HC, which played in the 2nd Bundesliga at the time. In 2001-02 the club was promoted again to the Bundesliga with Urbanke as the key player. In the 2002-03 season they finished 4th in the Bundesliga and won the DHB-Pokal. Aged 35 Urbanke was the top scorer in the Bundesliga and won the player of the season award. In the 2003-04 season FHC won the German championship, and Urbanke was once again named the player of the year. Afterwards she retired from handball, but made a comeback in March 2005 for the second tier team Thüringer HC, where she played the rest of the season.

== National team ==
Bianca Urbanke played both for the East Germany and the unified Germany teams. In 1987 she made her debut for the East German team.

She missed the 1990 World Championship, as she had already moved to West Germany to join Bayer Leverkusen.

Her first major tournament was the 1992 Olympics, where Germany finished 4th. The following year she won the 1993 World Women's Handball Championship, beating Denmark in the final. In 1994 she won silver medals at the inaugural European championship, this time losing to Denmark.

She only saw minimal playing time at the 1996 Olympics, which made her announce that she would not play under Ekke Hoffmann, the German head coach, anymore. Therefore she did not play at the 1997 World Championship and the 1998 European Championship. When Lothar Doering became the German head coach, she returned to the national team and played at the 1999 World Championship, where Germany finished 7th.

== Private ==
Bianca Urbanke-Rösicke is married to handball coach Dietmar Rösicke, and they have two children together. They met when he coached ASK Vorwärts Frankfurt.
