= TuS Walle Bremen =

German handball team

- Full name: Turn- und Sportverein Walle Bremen von 1891 e. V.
- Founded: 1891; 135 years ago
- Dissolved: 2008; 18 years ago

Turn- und Sportverein Walle Bremen von 1891 e. V., more commonly known as TuS Walle Bremen was a German multisports team from the Walle district of Bremen, founded in 1891. It was most famous for its handball women's team, which won the German championship multiple times in the 1990s. The team was dissolved in 2008 after declaring bankruptcy in December 2007 as they owed ®720,000 which they could not pay.

== Honours ==
=== Domestic competitions ===
- Handball-Bundesliga Frauen:
  - Champions (5): 1991, 1992, 1994, 1995, 1996
- German Cup:
  - Winners (3): 1993, 1994, 1995

=== International Competitions ===
- EHF Women's Cup Winners' Cup:
  - Winners (1): 1994

== Notable former players ==
- (Germany) Michaela Erler
- (Germany) Silke Gnad
- (Germany) Tine Lindemann
- (Germany) Dagmar Stelberg
- (Germany) Cordula David
- (Hungary) Eva Kiss-Györi
- (Denmark) Anja Andersen
- (Soviet Union) Maryna Bazanova
