= Katalin Szilágyi =

Hungarian handball player (born 1965)

Personal information
- Born: 16 November 1965 (age 60) Nyíregyháza, Hungary
- Height: 1.66 m (5 ft 5 in)
- Weight: 60 kg (132 lb)

Sport
- Sport: Handball
- Position: Right wing
- Current club: Retired

Youth career
- Years: Team
- –: Nyíregyházi VSC

Senior clubs
- Years: Team
- 1981–1991: Debreceni VSC
- 1991–1998: HV Swift Roermond
National team
| Years | Team | Apps | (Gls) |
| 1985–1996 | Hungary | 179 | (627) |
Medal record
Women's handball
Representing Hungary
Olympic Games
| Bronze medal – third place | 1996 Atlanta | Team |
World Championship
| Silver medal – second place | 1995 Austria/Hungary | Team |

Katalin Szilágyi (born 16 November 1965 in Nyíregyháza) is a Hungarian former handball player (right wing) who won the bronze medal with the Hungarian team at the 1996 Summer Olympics in Atlanta. She played all five matches and scored 13 goals.

== Awards ==
- Hungarian Handballer of the Year: 1987
