= Kim Rang =

South Korean handball player (born 1974)

- Korean name
- Hangul: 김랑
- RR: Gim Rang
- MR: Kim Rang

Olympic medal record

Women's handball

Representing South Korea
Silver medal – second place	1996 Atlanta	Team

World Championship
Gold medal – first place	1995 Austria/Hungary	

Asian Games
Gold medal – first place	1994 Hiroshima	

Kim Rang (born October 9, 1974) is a South Korean handball player who competed in the 1996 Summer Olympics.

In 1996 she was part of the South Korean team which who the silver medal. She played all five matches and scored 14 goals.

In 1995 she was part of the South Korea team that won the 1995 World Championship.

She also won a gold medal at the 1994 Asian Games.
