= Marianne Florman =

Danish handball player (born 1964)

Personal information
- Full name: Marianne Florman Christensen
- Nationality: Danish
- Born: 1 June 1964 (age 62) Frederiksberg, Copenhagen, Denmark
- Height: 178 cm (70 in)

Sport
- Sport: Handball
- Position: Left Wing

Senior clubs
- Years: Team
- 1980–1987: IF Hjorten
- 1987–1991: Rødovre HK
- 1991–1996: Frederiksberg IF
- 1996–1997: Chateraise Fofu (Japan)
- 1997–1999: BK Ydun
National team
Years	Team	Apps	(Gls)
1990–1997	Denmark	107	(170)
Medal record
Women's handball
Representing Denmark
Olympic Games
Gold medal – first place	1996 Atlanta	Team competition
World Championships
Silver medal – second place	1993 Norway	Team competition
Bronze medal – third place	1995 Austria and Hungary	Team competition
European Championship
Gold medal – first place	1994 Germany	Team
Gold medal – first place	1996 Denmark	Team

Marianne Florman (born 1 June 1964) is a Danish former team handball player and Olympic champion, journalist, author and personal coach. She won a gold medal with the Danish national team at the 1996 Summer Olympics in Atlanta. With the Danish national team she also won the European Championship twice.

== Career ==
=== Handball ===
She started playing handball at IF Hjorten i 1980 as a Goalkeeper. In 1987 she switched to the 1st Division club Rødovre Håndboldklub. In 1990 she was called up to the Danish national team as a left wing.

By 1997 she began to lose her spot on the national team. She retired in 2001 when she became pregnant with her first of two children. After her professional career she has featured at lower levels recreationally.

=== Civil career ===
Florman has a degree in Pedagogy from Roskilde University from 1995, a degree in Pedagogical Psychology from the Danish School of Education, and a degree in journalism from Danish School of Media and Journalism.

From 1998 to 2000 Florman was a presenter at Danmarks Radio's sports section. She has since then been a TV presenter at DR1 and dk4, as well as editor of the sports magazine FriPuls. She has also been a part of the National Olympic Committee and Sports Confederation of Denmark. She has acted as personal coach in her own company, and she is the author on a list of books on leadership and exercise.

She participated in the first season of the Danish version of Dancing with the Stars.

== Bibliography ==
- 1996: En jernladys lærdom
- 1997: Kunsten at gøre sig umage (co-author)
- 1998: Drømmemanden (co-author)
- 1998: Husk passet (co-author)
- 2004: Løbebog for kvinder (together with Jens Hansen)
- 2017: Vejen til hestens hjerte / og dit eget (together with Mathilde Denning)
