= Kim Mi-sim =

South Korean handball player (born 1970)

- Korean name
- Hangul: 김미심
- RR: Gim Misim
- MR: Kim Misim

Olympic medal record

Women's Handball
Silver medal – second place	1996 Atlanta	Team

World Championship
Gold medal – first place	1995 Austria/Hungary	

Asian Games
Gold medal – first place	1994 Hiroshima	

Kim Mi-sim (born November 6, 1970) is a South Korean handball player who competed in the 1996 Summer Olympics.

In 1996, she was part of the South Korean team which who the silver medal. She played in all five matches and scored 13 goals.

In 1995 she was part of the South Korea team that won the 1995 World Championship.
