= Laura Coenen =

American handball player

Personal information
- Born: October 16, 1962 (age 63) Neenah, Wisconsin, U.S.

Career highlights
- Big Ten Player of the Year (1983)

Laura Coenen (born October 16, 1962) is an American former basketball and handball player who competed in the latter sport in the 1988 Summer Olympics, in the 1992 Summer Olympics, and in the 1996 Summer Olympics.

Coenen was born in Neenah, Wisconsin. Before switching to handball, she had been a basketball star at the University of Minnesota, where she won the inaugural Big Ten Conference Player of the Year award in 1983.
