= Lenka Černá =

Czech handball player

Lenka Pospíšilová-Černá
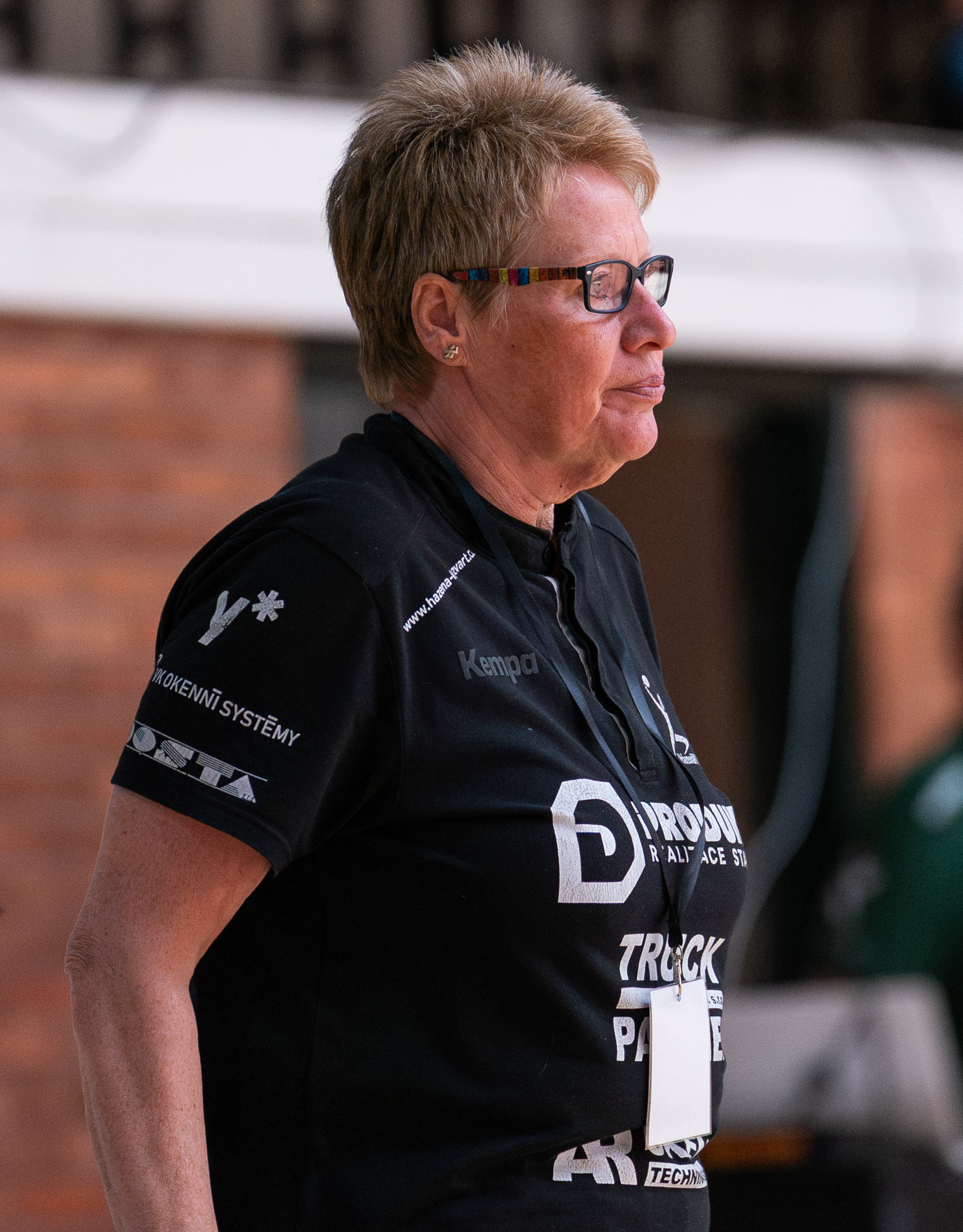

Personal information
- Nationality: Czechoslovakia
- Born: 13 May 1966 (age 60) Olomouc, Czechoslovakia
- Height: 178 cm (70 in)

Sport
- Sport: Handball
- Position: Goalkeeper

Senior clubs
- Years: Team
- ?-?: Zora Olomouc
- 1995-2001: ASPTT Metz
- 2001-2003: TV Lützellinden
- 2005-2008: HC Britterm Veseli
- 2008-2012: Zora Olomouc
- 2012-2013: Iuventa Michalovce
National team
Years	Team	Apps
?-?	Czechoslovakia	3
- Updated on only during the 1988 Summer Olympics

Lenka Pospíšilová-Černá (born 13 May 1966) is a Czech former handball player. She was a member of the Czechoslovakia women's national handball team. She was part of the team at the 1988 Summer Olympics. On club level she played for Zora Olomouc, HC Britterm Veseli and DHK Zora Olomouc in her home country, ASPTT Metz in France, TV Lützellinden in Germany.

== Titles ==
=== club ===
- French Championship 1996, 1997, 1999, 2000, 2004 and 2004
- Coupe de France 1998 and 1999
- French Coupe de la Ligue 2005
- Czech Championship 2006
