= Dawn Allinger =

American handball player

Personal information
- Nationality: American
- Born: September 3, 1968 (age 57)

Sport
- Sport: Handball

Dawn Michele Allinger (born September 3, 1968) is an American former handball and basketball player. She competed in the women's tournament at the 1996 Summer Olympics. She later became a broadcaster for NBC Sports.

Allinger attended Washington State University, where she played on the women's basketball team.
