= Kim Clarke =

American handball player

Personal information
- Full name: Kim Dorota Clarke
- Born: 31 January 1965 (age 61) Tulsa, Oklahoma, U.S.
- Education: St. Ambrose University

Sport
- Sport: Handball

Kim Dorota Clarke (born January 31, 1965) is an American former handball player who competed in the 1988 Summer Olympics (Seoul, South Korea), in the 1992 Summer Olympics (Barcelona, Spain), and in the 1996 Summer Olympics (Atlanta, Georgia, US). Kim Clarke graduated from St. Ambrose University in 1991, where she played on the Women's Basketball team, including her sophomore (1988–89) and senior (1990–91) season where she helped the team get to the NAIA (National Association of Intercollegiate Athletics) Final Four.
