= Eike Bram =

German handball player (born 1965)

Personal information
- Nationality: German
- Born: March 20, 1965 (age 61) Bremerhaven, Germany
- Height: 180 cm (71 in)

Sport
- Sport: Handball
- Position: Goalkeeper

Senior clubs
- Years: Team
- -1985: OSC Bremerhaven
- 1985-1989: VfL Engelskirchen
- 1989-1993: Bayer 04 Leverkusen
- 1993-2002: Borussia Dortmund
- 2002-2006: Bayer 04 Leverkusen
National team
Years	Team	Apps
–	Germany	151
Medal record
Representing Germany
World Championship
Gold medal – first place	1993 Norway
European Championship
Silver medal – second place	1994 Germany

Eike Bram (born 20 March 1965) is a German handball player. She participated at the 1992 Summer Olympics, where the German national team placed fourth. She was also on the Germany team that won the 1993 World Women's Handball Championship.

== Career ==
Eike Bram started playing handball at OSC Bremerhaven. For the 1984/85 season she joined VfL Engelskirchen, where she played for 4 years.

She then joined Bayer 04 Leverkusen, where she won the 1990-91 German Cup. In 1993 she joined Borussia Dortmund. In 2002 she returned to Bayer 04 Leverkusen.

=== National team ===
She played 151 matches for the Germany national team. With Germany she won the 1993 World Women's Handball Championship and came second in the 1994 European Championship.
