= Franziska Heinz =

German handball player (born 1972)

Personal information
- Born: 21 November 1972 (age 53) Magdeburg, East Germany
- Height: 174 cm (69 in)

Sport
- Sport: Handball
- Position: Back

Senior clubs
- Years: Team
- -1986: Motor Mitte Magdeburg
- 1986-1994: SC Magdeburg
- 1994-2002: Borussia Dortmund
National team
Years	Team	Apps	(Gls)
–	Germany	187	(374)
–	Germany Beach		

Teams managed
- 2004-2006: Borussia Dortmund (youth coach)
- 2006-2009: Bayer 04 Leverkusen (assistent coach)
- 2009-2012: SC Greven 09
- 2014-2016: SC Westfalia Kinderhaus
- 2016-2022: SC DJK Everswinkel
Medal record
World Championship
Gold medal – first place	1993 Norway
Bronze medal – third place	1997 Germany

Franziska Heinz (born 21 November 1972) is a former East German and German female handball player and coach. She was a member of the Germany women's national handball team that won the 1993 World Championship.

== Playing career ==
On club level she played for Borussia Dortmund and SC Magdeburg. With Borussia Dortmund she won the 1997 DHB-Pokal and came second in the 1998 Bundesliga. In 1997 she was named the German Handballer of the year.

She retired in 2002 due to an achilles injury.

Later she became a beach handball player and won the 2010 German Beach Handball Championship.

=== National team ===
Heinz played 187 matches for the German national team, scoring 374 goals. In 1993 she won the 1993 World Championship. A year later she won silver medals at inaugural European Championship in 1994.

She was part of the team at the 1996 Summer Olympics, playing 4 matches.

At the 1997 World Championship, where Germany finished 3rd, she was named the best player at the tournament.

In 2006 she won the European Beach Handball Championship with the Germany Beach Handball Team.

== Coaching career ==
After her playing days she became the youth coach at Borussia Dortmund. In 2006 she became the assistent coach at Bayer 04 Leverkusen.

In 2009 she became the head coach of the 2nd Bundesliga team SC Greven 09, where she was until 2012.

From 2014 she became the coach of the lower league side SC Westfalia Kinderhaus. From 2016 to 2022 she coached the Oberliga team SC DJK Everswinkel.
