= Patricia Neder =

American handball player

Personal information
- Nationality: American
- Born: 14 December 1966 (age 59) Waukesha, Wisconsin, U.S.

Sport
- Sport: Handball

Patricia Neder (born December 14, 1966, in Waukesha, Wisconsin) is an American former handball, softball and basketball player. She competed in the 1992 Summer Olympics and in the 1996 Summer Olympics in handball.

Neder attended Winona State University, where she played both basketball and softball and set multiple school records during her time at the school. In 2006, Neder was inducted into the Winona State Athletic Hall of Fame.
