= Andrea Bölk =

German handball player (born 1968)

Personal information
- Nationality: German
- Born: November 10, 1968 (age 57) Rostock, East Germany
- Height: 179 cm (70 in)

Sport
- Sport: Handball
- Position: Centre back

Senior clubs
- Years: Team
- 1975-1983: TSG Wismar
- 1983-1990: SC Empor Rostock
- 1990-2000: Buxtehuder SV
- 2001-2002: TV Oyten
National team
Years	Team		
?-1990	East Germany		
1990-?	Germany	201	(361)
Medal record
Representing Germany
World Championship
Gold medal – first place	1993 Norway
European Championship
Silver medal – second place	1994 Germany

Andrea Bölk (née Andrea Stein, 10 November 1968) is a German handball player. She participated at the 1992 Summer Olympics, where the German national team placed fourth. She was also on the Germany team that won the 1993 World Championship.

== Career ==
Bölk started playing handball at TSG Wismar before joining SC Empor Rostock at the age of 14. Here she won the 1989 DDR-Championship. After the fall of the Berlin Wall he joined Buxtehuder SV in the United German Bundesliga. Here she won the 1994 Euro-City-Cup. She played over 200 matches for the club, scoring 872 goals. In 2000 she took a break due to pregnancy and joined TV Oyten in the Regionalliga for the 2001-02 season as a player-coach.

=== National team ===
Bölk represented first the East Germany national team and later the United Germany national team. She played 201 games for the Germany national team, scoring 361 goals. In 1993 she won the 1993 World Championship, beating Denmark in the final. At the inaugural European Championship in 1994 she won silver medals.

== Private ==
Andrea Bölk is the daughter of German soccer player Klaus-Peter Stein and handball player Inge Stein. She is married to fellow handballer Matthias Bölk Together they have two children, one of them being Emily Bölk, who also is a handballer.
