= Mona Dahle =

Norwegian handball player (born 1970)

Personal information
- Full name: Mona Dahle Sivertsen
- Nationality: Norwegian
- Born: 24 August 1970 (age 56) Trondheim, Norway
- Height: 168 cm (66 in)

Sport
- Sport: Handball
- Position: Left wing

Youth career
- Years: Team
- –: Trolla
- –: Vestbyen

Senior clubs
- Years: Team
- -1994: Byåsen IL
- –: Refstad-Veitvet IL
- –: Stabæk Håndball
National team
Years	Team	Apps	(Gls)
1991-1996	Norway	114	(151)
Medal record
Olympic Games
Silver medal – second place	1992 Barcelona	Team Competition

Mona Dahle (born 24 August 1970) is a Norwegian team handball player and Olympic medalist, born in Trondheim. She received silver medals at the 1992 Summer Olympics in Barcelona with the Norwegian national team. Mona Dahle played 114 games for the national team during her career, scoring 151 goals.

== Career ==
Dahle started playing handball at age 7. At the age of 15 she joined Byåsen IL. Here she won the Norwegian championship in 1989 and in 1990, and the Norwegian cup in 1989 and 1991. In 1994 she joined Refstad-Veitvet IL in Oslo, as she had just moved to Oslo to study. She later played for the Byåsen veteran team.

She has coached youth teams in addition to her active career.
