= Sharon Cain =

American handball player

Sharon Cain (born January 31, 1964, in San Antonio, Texas) is an American former handball player who competed in the 1992 Summer Olympics and in the 1996 Summer Olympics. At club level she played for the German club Buxtehuder SV.
