= Anja Andersen =

Danish handball player (born 1969)

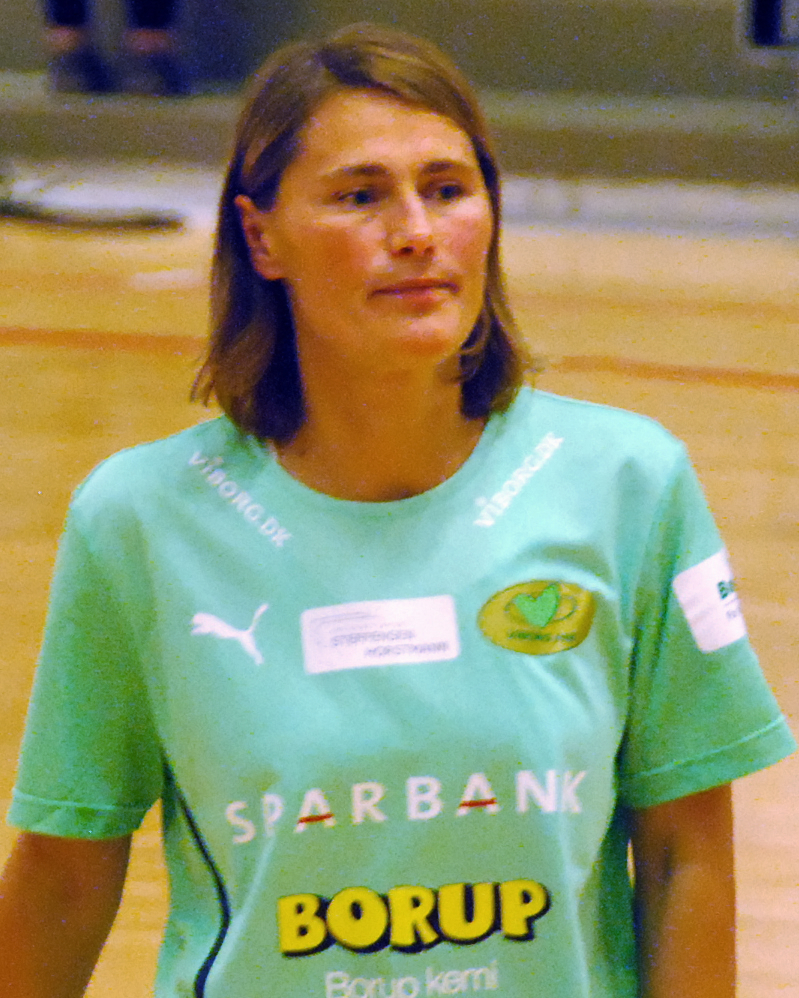

Personal information
- Born: 15 February 1969 (age 57) Odense, Denmark
- Height: 1.78 m (5 ft 10 in)

Sport
- Sport: Handball
- Position: Back

Senior clubs
- Years: Team
- –: Stjernen IF
- –: Vejle Allested
- –: ASH 72
- –: IF Jarl Arden
- 1986–1987: Aalborg KFUM
- 1987–1988: Ikast FS
- 1989: Viborg HK
- 1989–1993: Bækkelagets SK
- 1993–1996: TuS Walle Bremen
- 1996–1999: Bækkelagets SK
National team
Years	Team	Apps	(Gls)
1989–1998	Denmark	133	(725)

Teams managed
- 2000–2008: Slagelse DT
- 2006: Serbia & Montenegro
- 2008–2010: FC Copenhagen
- 2011: Oltchim Vâlcea
- 2011–2012: Viborg HK (Men's team)
- 2013–2015: DHG Odense
Medal record
Women's handball
Representing (Denmark)
Olympic Games
Gold medal – first place	1996 Atlanta	Team
World Championship
Gold medal – first place	1997 Germany	Team
Silver medal – second place	1993 Norway	Team
Bronze medal – third place	1995 Austria Hungary	Team
European Championship
Gold medal – first place	1994 Germany	Team
Gold medal – first place	1996 Denmark	Team

Anja Jul Andersen (born 15 February 1969) is a Danish former team handball player and current coach. She is an Olympic champion, World champion and two times European champion. In 1997, she was named IHF World Player of the Year. She is widely regarded as one of the best handball players of all time. She was admitted to the Danish Sports Hall of Fame in 2007. She was inducted into the EHF Hall of Fame in 2024.

== Playing career ==
Anja Andersen is known for her skills as an offensive player, as well as her temper and ability to make dramatic scenes and complete daring tricks during a match. She was key figure in the increased interest in Danish handball during the 1990s. After their first gold medal at the European championship in 1994, the national team earned the nickname "the iron ladies".

Although the national handball team of the 1990s had many profiles it is undisputed that Andersen was the most prolific and controversial. Although nobody questioned her skills, her temper, causing numerous expulsions from high-profile matches, was an issue of some debate. During the 1996 Summer Olympics, the Danish coach, Ulrik Wilbek, briefly banned her from the team due to disputes of her playing style and behavior on the floor.

She has played 133 matches for the Denmark national team and has scored 725 goals. This makes her the third most scoring player ever for the Denmark national team, behind Camilla Andersen and Janne Kolling, who were part of the same 'iron ladies' team.

It was also Andersen who introduced handball to true showmanship. Greatly influenced by basketball and notably the Harlem Globetrotters, she invented a playing style aimed at the audience rather than the opposing team. After her retirement as an active player, she organized a "dream team" of the best female handball players in 2000 and 2001 which played a selected Danish team. The "dream team" matches were a success, but they stopped when Andersen could no longer play actively herself.

Because of a heart defect, Andersen stopped her player career in 1999.

== Coaching career ==
Andersen immediately started coaching the Danish Women's Handball League club Slagelse. She first helped the team reach the top league and later win the Champions League three times, in 2003–04, 2004–05 and 2006–07. In 2006, she also coached the national team of Serbia.

In 2008, she left Slagelse for FCK Håndbold. In 2010, she left FCK Håndbold because the club dissolved and decided to take a break before coaching a new team.

In February 2011, Andersen became the new coach of Oltchim Râmnicu Vâlcea. The Romanian club hired her in the attempt of winning the Champions League.

In March 2011, after less than two months of coaching, she was fired because of poor results, losing two matches from a total of four on the bench of Oltchim in the main round of the Champions League.

In the 2011–12 season season she coached the Viborg HK men's team. She was released of her contract by the club for economic reasons. When she was hired an anonymous Viborg player complained about the appointment to the tabloid B.T., saying that "a man would not have respect for her coaching style".

In 2015 after parting ways with the 1. division club DHG Håndbold, she stated that her managing career was over, and that she "could not imagine getting involved with Handball again".

== Achievements and recognition ==
=== Achievements ===
During her active career as a handball player she won numerous tournaments:

- 1987 World Junior Championship silver medalist
- 1992 Norwegian League champion with Bækkelaget
- 1993 World Women's Handball Championship silver medalist
- 1994 European Women's Handball Championship gold medalist
- 1995 World Women's Handball Championship bronze medalist
- 1996 Summer Olympics gold medalist
- 1996 European Women's Handball Championship gold medalist
- 1997 World Women's Handball Championship gold medalist
- 1997 IHF World Player of the Year player (As of 2022 she is the only Danish female player besides Goalkeeper, Sandra Toft, to win this title, and until 1 March 2012, when Mikkel Hansen won the title, she was the only Danish player, male or female, who had ever won).

Her career as a coach has also yielded results:

- 2003, 2005 and 2007 winner of the Danish Women's Handball League with Slagelse
- 2004, 2005, 2007 winner of EHF Women's Champions League with Slagelse

=== Recognition ===
- 1994: Named the world's second best handball player
- 1996 European Championship MVP
- 1997: Named the world's best handball player
- 2007: Recorded in the Danish Hall of Fame
- 2009: Mathilde Prize for challenging the convention of coaches of elite athletes.
- 2024: EHF Hall of Fame

== Personal life ==
Andersen was born in Odense, Denmark. Her father, Keld Andersen, was also a handball player and featured in the Denmark national team.

Awards
Preceded by Lim O-Kyeong	IHF World Player of the Year – Women (1997)	Succeeded by Trine Haltvik
