= Janne Kolling =

Danish handball player (born 1968)

Personal information
- Nationality: Danish
- Born: 12 July 1968 (age 58) Aarhus, Denmark
- Height: 1.73 m (5 ft 8 in)

Sport
- Sport: Handball
- Position: Right Wing

Senior clubs
- Years: Team
- 1986–1987: Hornbæk SF
- 1987–1988: Viby IF
- 1988–1989: Kyndil
- 1989–1991: Lyngså BK
- 1991–1997: Viborg HK
- 1997–1999: Corteblanco Bidebieta
- 1999–2000: Tertnes HE
- 2000–2001: Slagelse DT
- 2007–2008: FCK Håndbold
National team
Years	Team	Apps	(Gls)
1988–2001	Denmark	250	(756)
Medal record
Women's handball
Representing Denmark
Olympic Games
Gold medal – first place	1996 Atlanta	Team
Gold medal – first place	2000 Sydney	Team
World Championship
Gold medal – first place	1997 Germany	Team
Silver medal – second place	1993 Norway	Team
Bronze medal – third place	1995 Austria Hungary	Team
European Championship
Gold medal – first place	1994 Germany	Team
Gold medal – first place	1996 Denmark	Team
Silver medal – second place	1998 Netherlands	Team

Janne Kolling (born 12 July 1968) is a Danish former team handball player, two times Olympic champion and a World champion. She received gold medals with the Danish national team at the 1996 Summer Olympics in Atlanta and at the 2000 Summer Olympics in Sydney.

She is the most tenured player ever on the Danish Women's national team with 250 matches, and she has scored the second most goals on the national team, only surpassed by Camilla Andersen.

In 2001 she retired due to knee injury. Since then she has worked with hospitality in Dansk Håndbold Forbund.
