= Hong Jeong-ho (handballer) =

South Korean handball player (born 1974)

Hong Jeong-Ho
Personal information
- Nationality: South Korean
- Born: 6 May 1974 (age 52) Jeju, South Korea
- Height: 178 cm (70 in)

Sport
- Sport: Handball
- Position: Right back
- Current club: Retired

Senior clubs
- Years: Team
- –1998: (Japan) Izumi
- 1998–2000: (Norway) Bækkelagets SK
- 2000–2003: (Denmark) Slagelse FH
- 2003–2010: (Japan) Omron Handball
National team
- Years: Team
- 1992–2008: South Korea

Teams managed
- 2024–: (Japan) Kumamoto Beaust Pindys
Medal record
Women's handball
Representing South Korea
Olympic Games
Gold medal – first place	1992 Barcelona	Team
Silver medal – second place	1996 Atlanta	Team
Bronze medal – third place	2008 Beijing	Team
World Championship
Gold medal – first place	1995 Austria/Hungary
Asian Games
Gold medal – first place	1994 Hiroshima	Team

Hong Jeong-Ho (born May 6, 1974) is a retired South Korean team handball player and current coach, Olympic and World champion. She is now based in Seoul and is involved in youth handball and also an expert commentator on TV.

== International career ==
She received gold medal at the 1992 Summer Olympics in Barcelona, playing for the Korean national team. She received a silver medal at the 1996 Summer Olympics in Atlanta. She received a bronze medal at the 2008 Summer Olympics in Beijing. In total she played 18 matches in her three Olympic games and scored a total of 77 goals. With her national team she also won the 1995 World Women's Handball Championship, which was the first time a non-European team won the title, and by 2026 the only Asian team to win the title.

== Club career ==
During her career she played for the Norwegian club Bækkelagets SK, Danish club Slagelse FH and Japanese clubs Omron Handball and Izumi. She won the Women's EHF Cup Winners' Cup in 1998/1999 with Bækkelagets SK and the Women's EHF Cup with Slagelse FH in 2002/2003. With Bækkelagets SK she won the Norwegian League in 1998 and with Slagelse FH she won the Danish championship in 2002/2003. She then went on to play for Omron Handball, where she played until 2010.

In 2024 she became the head coach of her former club, which now was called Kumamoto Beaust Pindys.

== Individual honors ==
- Top scorer of the 1993 World Women's Handball Championship with 58 goals.
- All Star Team, Best Right Back: 1996 Summer Olympics
- South Korea's top scorer at 2008 Summer Olympics with 44 goals
