= Beáta Hoffmann =

Hungarian handball player (born 1967)

Personal information
- Born: 22 June 1967 (age 59) Győr, Hungary
- Height: 1.76 m (5 ft 9 in)
- Weight: 68 kg (150 lb)

Sport
- Sport: Handball
- Position: Goalkeeper
- Current club: Retired

Youth career
- Years: Team
- –: Győri Textiles

Senior clubs
- Years: Team
- 1984–1992: Budapesti Építők
- 1992–2001: Győri ETO KC
National team
Years	Team	Apps	(Gls)
1988–1998	Hungary	126	(0)
Medal record
Women's handball
Representing Hungary
Olympic Games
Bronze medal – third place	1996 Atlanta	Team
World Championship
Silver medal – second place	1995 Austria/Hungary	Team

Beáta Hoffmann (born 22 June 1967 in Győr) is a former Hungarian handball goalkeeper, World Championship silver medalist and Olympic bronze medalist.
