= Chryssandra Hires =

American handball player

Personal information
- Full name: Chryssandra Annette Watts Hires
- Nationality: American
- Born: 27 November 1966 (age 59)

Sport
- Sport: Handball

Chryssandra Annette Watts Hires (born November 27, 1966) is an American former handball player who competed in the 1992 Summer Olympics and in the 1996 Summer Olympics.

Hires was born on November 27, 1966. She played basketball at Bristol Eastern High School from 1980 to 1984, as well as high school volleyball and track. Hires then attended the University of North Carolina at Chapel Hill, where she was a member of the Tar Heels women's basketball team, and continued to run track.

In 1989, Hires was offered a chance to try out for the United States women's national handball team. She made the team, and appeared in both the 1992 and 1996 Summer Olympics.

Following the end of her competitive athletic career, Hires worked as a sports physiotherapist and coached basketball at Brant Lake Sports Academy. Hires was inducted into the Bristol Sports Hall of Fame in 2002, followed by the Connecticut Women's Basketball Hall of Fame in 2014.
