= Michaela Erler =

German handball player (born 1965)

Michaela Erler (born 29 June 1965 in Berlin) is a German handball player. She is a world champion from the 1993 World Championship. She participated at the 1992 Summer Olympics, where the German national team placed fourth.

At club level she played for TSV Tempelhof, Blau-Weiß Berlin, Reinickendorfer Füchse, TSV GutsMuths Berlin, VfL Engelskirchen (1984–1988), Bayer Leverkusen (1988–1993), TuS Walle Bremen (1993–1996) und Borussia Dortmund (1996–2003).

She played 285 games for the German national team, scoring 690. This makes her the second most tenured player for Germany ever, only behind Grit Jurack with 287 games. She retired from the national team in 1998.
