= 1993 World Women's Handball Championship =

1993 edition of the World Women's Handball Championship

Tournament details
- Host country: Norway
- Dates: 24 November – 5 December 1993
- Teams: 16 (from 4 confederations)

Final positions
- Champions: Germany (1st title)
- Runners-up: Denmark
- Third place: Norway

Tournament statistics
- Matches played: 54
- Goals scored: 2,364 (43.78 per match)
- Top scorer: (South Korea) Hong Jeong-ho (58 goals)

The 1993 World Women's Handball Championship was the 11th World Championship in women's handball took place in Norway from 24 November to 5 December 1993 and was played between 16 nations. In the final it would be Germany would take home their first title as a unified nation as they defeated Denmark in extra-time 22–21.

Despite finishing 2nd, the World Championship marked the beginning of the Danish Golden generation known as the 'Iron Ladies'.

== Qualification ==
Host nation

- Norway

Qualified from the 1990 World Championship

- Russia
- Germany
- Austria
- Romania
- Poland
- Denmark

Qualified from the 1992 World Championship B

- Hungary
- Czechoslovakia
- Sweden
- Lithuania
- Spain

Qualified from the 1991 Pan American Women's Handball Championship

- United States

Qualified from the 1992 African Women's Handball Championship

- Angola

Qualified from the 1993 Asian Women's Handball Championship

- South Korea
- China

== Preliminary round ==
Team advanced to the Knockout stage

=== Group A ===
Team	Pld	W	D	L	GF	GA	GD	Pts
Norway	3	3	0	0	61	47	+14	6
Hungary	3	1	1	1	62	56	+6	3
Poland	3	1	1	1	61	67	−6	3
Spain	3	0	0	3	48	62	−14	0

24 November 1993	Poland	20–19	Spain	Oslo
24 November 1993		(9–10)		Oslo

24 November 1993	Norway	18–15	Hungary	Oslo
24 November 1993		(6–9)		Oslo

26 November 1993	Hungary	25–25	Poland
26 November 1993		(13–12)

26 November 1993	Spain	16–20	Norway
26 November 1993		(6–12)

27 November 1993	Norway	23–16	Poland
27 November 1993		(12–8)

27 November 1993	Hungary	22–13	Spain
27 November 1993		(9–9)

=== Group B ===
Team	Pld	W	D	L	GF	GA	GD	Pts
Denmark	3	3	0	0	78	69	+9	6
Russia	3	2	0	1	75	68	+7	4
South Korea	3	1	0	2	76	81	−5	2
Lithuania	3	0	0	3	66	77	−11	0

24 November 1993	Denmark	25–23	Lithuania
24 November 1993		(13–12)

24 November 1993	Russia	28–25	South Korea
24 November 1993		(14–12)

26 November 1993	Lithuania	19–26	Russia
26 November 1993		(11–13)

26 November 1993	South Korea	25–29	Denmark
26 November 1993		(13–15)

27 November 1993	South Korea	26–24	Lithuania
27 November 1993		(17–11)

27 November 1993	Russia	21–24	Denmark
27 November 1993		(10–12)

=== Group C ===
Team	Pld	W	D	L	GF	GA	GD	Pts
Sweden	3	2	0	1	61	53	+8	4
Romania	3	2	0	1	67	57	+10	4
Germany	3	2	0	1	68	47	+21	4
Angola	3	0	0	3	43	82	−39	0

24 November 1993	Romania	26–16	Angola
24 November 1993		(10–6)

24 November 1993	Germany	17–15	Sweden
24 November 1993		(7–8)

26 November 1993	Sweden	20–17	Romania
26 November 1993		(11–12)

26 November 1993	Angola	8–30	Germany
26 November 1993		(3–17)

27 November 1993	Germany	21–24	Romania
27 November 1993		(9–11)

27 November 1993	Sweden	26–19	Angola
27 November 1993		(14–8)

=== Group D ===
Team	Pld	W	D	L	GF	GA	GD	Pts
Czechoslovakia (Note: Even though Czechoslovakia had split into the Czech republic and Slovakia, the countries still competed with a unified team.)	3	3	0	0	65	53	+12	6
Austria	3	2	0	1	63	48	+15	4
United States	3	1	0	2	58	76	−18	2
China	3	0	0	3	67	76	−9	0

Notes:

24 November 1993	China	26–27	United States	Bergen
24 November 1993		(17–13)		Bergen

24 November 1993	Austria	13–16	Czechoslovakia	Bergen
24 November 1993		(6–7)		Bergen

26 November 1993	United States	11–27	Austria	Bergen
26 November 1993		(3–13)		Bergen

26 November 1993	Czechoslovakia	26–20	China	Bergen
26 November 1993		(13–10)		Bergen

27 November 1993	Austria	23–21	China	Bergen
27 November 1993		(14–11)		Bergen

27 November 1993	Czechoslovakia	23–20	United States	Bergen
27 November 1993		(10–9)		Bergen

== Main Round ==
Team advanced to the final
Team advanced to the bronze match

=== Group 1 ===
Team	Pld	W	D	L	GF	GA	GD	Pts
Denmark	5	4	0	1	143	122	+21	8
Norway	5	4	0	1	104	91	+13	8
Russia	5	2	1	2	113	109	+4	5
Hungary	5	1	2	2	120	135	−15	4
Poland	5	1	1	3	117	136	−19	3
South Korea	5	1	0	4	136	140	−4	2

30 November 1993	Norway	21–18	South Korea
30 November 1993		(8–11)

30 November 1993	Hungary	24–24	Russia
30 November 1993		(12–13)

30 November 1993	Poland	25–30	Denmark
30 November 1993		(13–17)

1 December 1993	Russia	19–14	Norway
1 December 1993		(9–8)

1 December 1993	South Korea	37–29	Poland
1 December 1993		(18–14)

1 December 1993	Denmark	37–23	Hungary
1 December 1993		(21–11)

3 December 1993	Norway	28–23	Denmark
3 December 1993		(13–9)

3 December 1993	Poland	22–21	Russia
3 December 1993		(9–8)

3 December 1993	Hungary	33–31	South Korea
3 December 1993		(13–15)

=== Group 2 ===
Team	Pld	W	D	L	GF	GA	GD	Pts
Germany	5	4	0	1	109	82	+27	8
Romania	5	3	0	2	111	93	+18	6
Sweden	5	3	0	2	95	80	+15	6
Austria	5	3	0	2	83	78	+5	6
Czechoslovakia	5	2	0	3	99	99	0	4
United States	5	0	0	5	69	134	−65	0

28 November 1993	Romania	15–16	Austria
28 November 1993		(9–9)

28 November 1993	Sweden	30–11	United States
28 November 1993		(17–3)

28 November 1993	Germany	22–21	Czechoslovakia
28 November 1993		(13–10)

30 November 1993	United States	12–24	Germany
30 November 1993		(5–13)

30 November 1993	Czechoslovakia	21–25	Romania
30 November 1993		(11–10)

30 November 1993	Austria	17–11	Sweden
30 November 1993		(9–4)

1 December 1993	Germany	25–10	Austria
1 December 1993		(9–4)

1 December 1993	Romania	30–15	United States
1 December 1993		(17–5)

1 December 1993	Sweden	19–18	Czechoslovakia
1 December 1993		(10–8)

== Classification round ==
Losers of preliminary round plays for places 13–16.

Team	Pld	W	D	L	GF	GA	GD	Pts
Lithuania	3	3	0	0	88	59	+29	6
China	3	2	0	1	92	84	+8	4
Spain	3	1	0	2	64	79	−15	2
Angola	3	0	0	3	60	82	−22	0

30 November 1993	Spain	21–15	Angola
30 November 1993		(8–8)

30 November 1993	Lithuania	34–21	China
30 November 1993		(18–9)

1 December 1993	Angola	19–26	Lithuania
1 December 1993		(9–12)

1 December 1993	China	36–24	Spain
1 December 1993		(17–11)

3 December 1993	Spain	19–28	Lithuania
3 December 1993		(7–14)

3 December 1993	Angola	26–35	China
3 December 1993		(15–17)

== Finals ==
=== 11th place match ===
5 December 1993	United States	21–29	South Korea	Oslo
5 December 1993		(9–16)		Oslo

=== 9th place match ===
5 December 1993	Poland	17–22	Czechoslovakia	Oslo
5 December 1993		(10–10)		Oslo

=== 7th place match ===
5 December 1993	Austria	9–16	Hungary	Oslo
5 December 1993		(3–7)		Oslo

=== 5th place match ===
5 December 1993	Russia	25–19	Sweden	Oslo
5 December 1993		(13–12)		Oslo

=== Bronze final ===
5 December 1993	Romania	19–20	Norway	Oslo
5 December 1993		(9–11)		Oslo

=== Final ===
5 December 1993
Denmark
21–22 (ET)
Germany
Oslo

(8–8)

FT: 17–17 ET: 4–5

== Final standings ==
Pos	Team
1st place, gold medalist(s)	Germany
2nd place, silver medalist(s)	Denmark
3rd place, bronze medalist(s)	Norway
4	Romania
5	Russia
6	Sweden
7	Hungary
8	Austria
9	Czechoslovakia*
10	Poland
11	South Korea
12	United States
13	Lithuania
14	China
15	Spain
16	Angola

*Even though Czechoslovakia had split into the Czech republic and Slovakia, the countries still competed with a unified team.

1993 Women's World Champions

Germany
First title

Team roster: Michaela Schanze, Bianca Urbanke, Sabine Adamik, Andrea Bölk, Eike Bram, Carola Ciszewski, Cordula David, Michaela Erler, Karen Heinrich, Gabriele Palme, Renate Zienkiewicz, Sybille Gruner, Heike Murrweiss, Birgit Wagner, Heike Axmann, Franziska Heinz
Head coach Lothar Doering.

=== Top scorers ===
1	Hong Jeong-ho (KOR) 58
2	Natalya Morskova (RUS) 50
3	Zuzana Prekopova (TCH) 44
4	Mirella Mierzejewska (POL) 41
5	Anja Andersen (DEN) 40
