= Handball at the 1996 Summer Olympics – Women's tournament =

1996 Women's Olympic handball tournament
Tournament details
- Host country: United States
- City: Atlanta
- Venue: Georgia World Congress Center
- Dates: 26 July – 3 August 1996
- Teams: 8 (from 4 confederations)

Final positions
- Champions: Denmark (1st title)
- Runners-up: South Korea
- Third place: Hungary
- Fourth place: Norway

Tournament statistics
- Matches played: 18
- Goals scored: 901 (50.06 per match)
- Top scorers: (South Korea) Lim O-kyeong (41 goals)

The women's handball tournament at the 1996 Summer Olympics was contested by eight teams divided in two groups, with the top two proceeding to the semifinals and the bottom two proceeding to placement matches.

== Qualification ==
Mean of qualification	Date	Host	Vacancies	Qualified
1994 European Championship	17–25 September 1994	Germany	1	Germany*
1995 Pan American Games	15–24 March 1995	(Argentina) Mar del Plata	1	United States
1995 Asian Championship	6–8 May 1995	(South Korea) Seoul	1	China*
African qualification tournament	9 August 1995	(Ivory Coast) Abidjan	1	Angola
1995 World Championship	5–17 December 1995	Austria; Hungary	4	South Korea; Hungary; Denmark; Norway
Total			8	

== Preliminary round ==
=== Group A ===
Pos	Team	Pld	W	D	L	GF	GA	GD	Pts	Qualification
1	Denmark	3	3	0	0	89	62	+27	6	Semifinals
2	Hungary	3	2	0	1	81	70	+11	4	Semifinals
3	China	3	1	0	2	71	83	−12	2	Fifth place game
4	United States (H)	3	0	0	3	64	90	−26	0	Seventh place game

Rules for classification: 1) points; 2) head-to-head points; 3) head-to-head goal difference; 4) head-to-head number of goals scored; 5) goal difference.
(H) Hosts

26 July 1996; 10:00	Hungary	29–19	China	Georgia World Congress Center; Referees: Øie, Høgsnes (NOR)
26 July 1996; 10:00	Mátéfi 11	(14–11)	Shi 5	Georgia World Congress Center; Referees: Øie, Høgsnes (NOR)

26 July 1996; 14:30	Denmark	29–19	United States	Georgia World Congress Center; Referees: Brussel, van Dongen (NED)
26 July 1996; 14:30	A. Andersen 8	(13–9)	Hires 8	Georgia World Congress Center; Referees: Brussel, van Dongen (NED)

28 July 1996; 12:00	China	21–33	Denmark	Georgia World Congress Center; Referees: Moelle Mabounda, Mvoula (CGO)
28 July 1996; 12:00	Shi 6	(9–19)	Madsen 7	Georgia World Congress Center; Referees: Moelle Mabounda, Mvoula (CGO)

28 July 1996; 14:30	United States	24–30	Hungary	Georgia World Congress Center; Referees: Thomas, Thomas (GER)
28 July 1996; 14:30	Hires 8	(8–19)	Németh 6	Georgia World Congress Center; Referees: Thomas, Thomas (GER)

30 July 1996; 10:00	Hungary	22–27	Denmark	Georgia World Congress Center; Referees: Gallego, Lamas (ESP)
30 July 1996; 10:00	Mátéfi 7	(12–14)	C. Andersen 7	Georgia World Congress Center; Referees: Gallego, Lamas (ESP)

30 July 1996; 16:30	China	31–21	United States	Georgia World Congress Center; Referees: Guterman, Gedvilas (LTU)
30 July 1996; 16:30	Zhai 11	(16–11)	Hires 6	Georgia World Congress Center; Referees: Guterman, Gedvilas (LTU)

=== Group B ===
Pos	Team	Pld	W	D	L	GF	GA	GD	Pts	Qualification
1	South Korea	3	3	0	0	83	60	+23	6	Semifinals
2	Norway	3	2	0	1	79	66	+13	4	Semifinals
3	Germany	3	1	0	2	70	73	−3	2	Fifth place game
4	Angola	3	0	0	3	49	82	−33	0	Seventh place game

Rules for classification: 1) points; 2) head-to-head points; 3) head-to-head goal difference; 4) head-to-head number of goals scored; 5) goal difference.

26 July 1996; 12:00	Norway	30–18	Angola	Georgia World Congress Center; Referees: Boehne, Bojsen (USA)
26 July 1996; 12:00	Grini 10	(15–7)	Barbosa 4	Georgia World Congress Center; Referees: Boehne, Bojsen (USA)

26 July 1996; 16:30	South Korea	33–20	Germany	Georgia World Congress Center; Referees: Elbrønd, Løvqvist (DEN)
26 July 1996; 16:30	Lim 7	(17–12)	Erler, Luca 4	Georgia World Congress Center; Referees: Elbrønd, Løvqvist (DEN)

28 July 1996; 10:00	Angola	19–25	South Korea	Georgia World Congress Center; Referees: Dăncescu, Mateescu (ROU)
28 July 1996; 10:00	Webba 7	(8–15)	three players 5	Georgia World Congress Center; Referees: Dăncescu, Mateescu (ROU)

28 July 1996; 16:30	Germany	23–28	Norway	Georgia World Congress Center; Referees: Garcia, Moréno (FRA)
28 July 1996; 16:30	Ritskiavitchius 8	(11–15)	Grini 10	Georgia World Congress Center; Referees: Garcia, Moréno (FRA)

30 July 1996; 12:00	Germany	27–12	Angola	Georgia World Congress Center; Referees: Al-Houli, Al-Enezi (KUW)
30 July 1996; 12:00	Jurack, Waelzer 5	(10–6)	Webba 5	Georgia World Congress Center; Referees: Al-Houli, Al-Enezi (KUW)

30 July 1996; 14:30	South Korea	25–21	Norway	Georgia World Congress Center; Referees: Vujnović, Mladinić (CRO)
30 July 1996; 14:30	Lim 9	(12–10)	Grini 7	Georgia World Congress Center; Referees: Vujnović, Mladinić (CRO)

== Playoffs ==
=== Bracket ===
Semifinals
1 August
Denmark	23
Norway	19
1 August
South Korea	39
Hungary	25

Gold medal game
3 August
Denmark (OT)	37
South Korea	33
Bronze medal game
3 August
Norway	18
Hungary	20

=== Semifinals ===
1 August 1996; 11:45	Denmark	23–19	Norway	Georgia World Congress Center; Referees: Thomas, Thomas (GER)
1 August 1996; 11:45	A. Andersen 9	(12–6)	Grini, Larsen 4	Georgia World Congress Center; Referees: Thomas, Thomas (GER)

1 August 1996; 16:15	South Korea	39–25	Hungary	Georgia World Congress Center; Referees: Brussel, van Dongen (NED)
1 August 1996; 16:15	Hong 9	(19–10)	Mátéfi 5	Georgia World Congress Center; Referees: Brussel, van Dongen (NED)

=== Seventh place game ===
1 August 1996; 10:00	United States	23–24	Angola	Georgia World Congress Center; Referees: Moelle Mabounda, Mvoula (CGO)
1 August 1996; 10:00	Cain 8	(11–11)	Barbosa 6	Georgia World Congress Center; Referees: Moelle Mabounda, Mvoula (CGO)

=== Fifth place game ===
1 August 1996; 14:30	Germany	26–28	China	Georgia World Congress Center; Referees: Vujnović, Mladinić (CRO)
1 August 1996; 14:30	Heinz 7	(12–16)	Shi 12	Georgia World Congress Center; Referees: Vujnović, Mladinić (CRO)

=== Bronze medal game ===
3 August 1996; 15:30	Norway	18–20	Hungary	Georgia World Congress Center; Referees: Brussel, van Dongen (NED)
3 August 1996; 15:30	Grini 8	(9–7)	four players 3	Georgia World Congress Center; Referees: Brussel, van Dongen (NED)

=== Gold medal game ===
3 August 1996
17:15
Denmark
37–33 (ET)
South Korea
Georgia World Congress Center
Referees: Thomas, Thomas (GER)
A. Andersen 11
(13–17)
Lim 15

FT: 29–29 ET: 2–2, 6–2

== Rankings and statistics ==
Final rankings
1	Denmark
2	South Korea
3	Hungary
4	Norway
5	China
6	Germany
7	Angola
8	United States

Top goalscorers
Player	Games	Goals	Attempts
1. (South Korea) Lim O-kyeong	5	41	58
2. (Norway) Kjersti Grini	5	39	74
3. (Hungary) Eszter Mátéfi	5	35	58
4. (Denmark) Anja Andersen	5	33	55
5. (China) Shi Wei	4	31	63
6. (China) Zhai Chao	4	29	52
7. (United States) Chryssandra Hires	4	26	55
8. (South Korea) Oh Seong-ok	5	24	47

All-star team
(Denmark) Susanne Lauritsen (goalkeeper)
(Norway) Kjersti Grini (left back)	(Denmark) Anja Andersen (right back)	(South Korea) Hong Jeong-ho (right wing)
(South Korea) Kim Eun-mi (left wing)	(Hungary) Erzsébet Kocsis (line player)	(South Korea) Lim O-kyeong (central back)
