= 1994 European Women's Handball Championship =

1994 EHF European Women's Handball Championship

Tournament details
- Host country: Germany
- Venues: 6 (in 6 host cities)
- Dates: 17–25 September
- Teams: 12 (from 1 confederation)

Final positions
- Champions: Denmark (1st title)
- Runners-up: Germany
- Third place: Norway
- Fourth place: Hungary

Tournament statistics
- Top scorer: (Hungary) Ágnes Farkas (48)

The 1994 EHF European Women's Handball Championship was the inaugural European Women's Championship. It was held in Germany from 17 to 25 September. It was won by Denmark after beating Germany 27–23 in the final match. This was the first time Denmark won a major international tournament.

== Venues ==
The European Championships were held in the following cities:

- Waiblingen
- Bonn
- Oldenburg
- Magdeburg
- Oberhausen
- Berlin (Final 4)

== Teams ==
Group A	Group B
Austria	Czech Republic
Croatia	Germany
Denmark	Hungary
Norway	Romania
Sweden	Russia
Ukraine	Slovakia

== Preliminary round ==
=== Group A ===
Pos	Team	Pld	W	D	L	GF	GA	GD	Pts	Qualification
1	Denmark	5	5	0	0	130	100	+30	10	Semifinals
2	Norway	5	3	0	2	92	89	+3	6	Semifinals
3	Croatia	5	3	0	2	88	92	−4	6	Fifth place game
4	Sweden	5	2	0	3	110	125	−15	4	Seventh place game
5	Austria	5	1	0	4	94	98	−4	2	Ninth place game
6	Ukraine	5	1	0	4	96	106	−10	2	Eleventh place game

September 17, 1994	Norway	25 – 23	Sweden
September 17, 1994		(12–11)

September 17, 1994	Denmark	26 – 20	Croatia
September 17, 1994		(13–8)

September 17, 1994	Austria	24 – 16	Ukraine
September 17, 1994		(16–10)

September 18, 1994	Croatia	14 – 13	Austria
September 18, 1994		(8–8)

September 18, 1994	Sweden	20 – 32	Denmark
September 18, 1994		(8–17)

September 18, 1994	Ukraine	16 – 19	Norway
September 18, 1994		(7–8)

September 19, 1994	Sweden	24 – 23	Ukraine
September 19, 1994		(18–14)

September 19, 1994	Norway	15 – 16	Croatia
September 19, 1994		(10–10)

September 19, 1994	Denmark	28 – 21	Austria
September 19, 1994		(15–12)

September 21, 1994	Croatia	20 – 17	Sweden
September 21, 1994		(9–9)

September 21, 1994	Austria	11 – 14	Norway
September 21, 1994		(6–8)

September 21, 1994	Denmark	21 – 20	Ukraine
September 21, 1994		(9–14)

September 22, 1994	Ukraine	21 – 18	Croatia
September 22, 1994		(9–10)

September 22, 1994	Austria	25 – 26	Sweden
September 22, 1994		(14–15)

September 22, 1994	Norway	19 – 23	Denmark
September 22, 1994		(8–10)

=== Group B ===
Pos	Team	Pld	W	D	L	GF	GA	GD	Pts	Qualification
1	Germany (H)	5	4	0	1	107	98	+9	8	Semifinals
2	Hungary	5	3	1	1	116	107	+9	7	Semifinals
3	Russia	5	3	0	2	117	89	+28	6	Fifth place game
4	Czech Republic	5	2	0	3	98	98	0	4	Seventh place game
5	Romania	5	2	0	3	88	98	−10	4	Ninth place game
6	Slovakia	5	0	1	4	82	118	−36	1	Eleventh place game

(H) Hosts

September 17, 1994	Germany	23 – 21	Russia
September 17, 1994		(10–8)

September 17, 1994	Romania	22 – 16	Slovakia
September 17, 1994		(13–8)

September 17, 1994	Hungary	25 – 19	Czech Republic
September 17, 1994		(13–9)

September 18, 1994	Czech Republic	21 – 22	Germany
September 18, 1994		(11–12)

September 18, 1994	Russia	21 – 14	Romania
September 18, 1994		(12–7)

September 18, 1994	Slovakia	23 – 23	Hungary
September 18, 1994		(17–9)

September 19, 1994	Romania	16 – 24	Hungary
September 19, 1994		(6–13)

September 19, 1994	Germany	20 – 13	Slovakia
September 19, 1994		(10–8)

September 19, 1994	Russia	17 – 19	Czech Republic
September 19, 1994		(8–8)

September 21, 1994	Slovakia	14 – 31	Russia
September 21, 1994		(8–16)

September 21, 1994	Romania	18 – 17	Czech Republic
September 21, 1994		(10–8)

September 21, 1994	Hungary	25 – 22	Germany
September 21, 1994		(12–8)

September 22, 1994	Czech Republic	22 – 16	Slovakia
September 22, 1994		(11–6)

September 22, 1994	Hungary	19 – 27	Russia
September 22, 1994		(11–14)

September 22, 1994	Germany	20 – 18	Romania
September 22, 1994		(13–9)

== Eleventh place game ==
September 24, 1994
11:00
Ukraine
30 – 29 (ET)
Slovakia
Oberhausen
Attendance: 350
Referees: Helmut Wille, Horst Vorderleitner (AUS)
Derepasko, Sakada 6
(12–11)
Salatová 11
2× (yellow card) 2× (suspension) 0× (red card)
Report
2× (yellow card) 3× (suspension) 1× (red card)

FT: 22–22 ET: 27–27, 30–29

== Ninth place game ==
September 24, 1994; 12:30	Austria	26 – 24	Romania	Oberhausen; Attendance: 500; Referees: Stefan Arnaldsson, Rögnvald Erlingson (ISL)
September 24, 1994; 12:30	Bozovic 8	(14–8)	Luca 10	Oberhausen; Attendance: 500; Referees: Stefan Arnaldsson, Rögnvald Erlingson (ISL)
September 24, 1994; 12:30	2× (yellow card) 5× (suspension) 0× (red card)	report	2× (yellow card) 4× (suspension) 0× (red card)	Oberhausen; Attendance: 500; Referees: Stefan Arnaldsson, Rögnvald Erlingson (ISL)

== Seventh place game ==
September 24, 1994; 15:00	Sweden	24 – 20	Czech Republic	Oberhausen; Attendance: 500; Referees: Francois Garcia, Jean-Pierre Moreno (FRA)
September 24, 1994; 15:00	Aasa 6	(12–10)	Ludmilova 8	Oberhausen; Attendance: 500; Referees: Francois Garcia, Jean-Pierre Moreno (FRA)
September 24, 1994; 15:00	3× (yellow card) 2× (suspension) 0× (red card)	report	2× (yellow card) 3× (suspension) 0× (red card)	Oberhausen; Attendance: 500; Referees: Francois Garcia, Jean-Pierre Moreno (FRA)

== Fifth place game ==
September 24, 1994; 16:30	Croatia	27 – 26	Russia	Oberhausen; Attendance: 700; Referees: Manfred Gremmel, Wolfgang Gremmel (GER)
September 24, 1994; 16:30	Petlika 12	(12–12)	Verakso 9	Oberhausen; Attendance: 700; Referees: Manfred Gremmel, Wolfgang Gremmel (GER)
September 24, 1994; 16:30	3× (yellow card) 6× (suspension) 1× (red card)	Report	3× (yellow card) 1× (suspension) 0× (red card)	Oberhausen; Attendance: 700; Referees: Manfred Gremmel, Wolfgang Gremmel (GER)

== Final round ==
Semi-Final
September 24, 1994
Denmark	29
Hungary	28
September 24, 1994
Germany	22
Norway	18

Final
September 25, 1994
Denmark	27
Germany	23
3rd/4th Place
September 25, 1994
Hungary	19
Norway	24

=== Semifinals ===
September 24, 1994
15:00
Denmark
29 – 28 (ET)
Hungary
Berlin
Attendance: 3700
Referees: Ion Serbu, Viorel Dobre (ROM)
C. Andersen, A. Andersen 7
(13–15)
Kocsis 9
2× (yellow card) 1× (suspension) 0× (red card)
Report
1× (yellow card) 6× (suspension) 0× (red card)

FT: 26–26 ET: 29–28

September 24, 1994; 17:00	Germany	22 – 18	Norway	Berlin; Attendance: 4000; Referees: Lyuben Kostov, Rumen Ivanchev (BUL)
September 24, 1994; 17:00	Erler 8	(12–9)	Larsen, Sagstuen 6	Berlin; Attendance: 4000; Referees: Lyuben Kostov, Rumen Ivanchev (BUL)
September 24, 1994; 17:00	2× (yellow card) 4× (suspension) 0× (red card)	Report	2× (yellow card) 2× (suspension) 0× (red card)	Berlin; Attendance: 4000; Referees: Lyuben Kostov, Rumen Ivanchev (BUL)

=== Bronze medal match ===
September 25, 1994; 15:00	Hungary	19 – 24	Norway	Berlin; Attendance: 4000; Referees: Per Elbrønd, Kjeld Løvqvist (DEN)
September 25, 1994; 15:00	Farkas 9	(6–10)	Steen 10	Berlin; Attendance: 4000; Referees: Per Elbrønd, Kjeld Løvqvist (DEN)
September 25, 1994; 15:00	2× (yellow card) 4× (suspension) 0× (red card)	Report	2× (yellow card) 6× (suspension) 0× (red card)	Berlin; Attendance: 4000; Referees: Per Elbrønd, Kjeld Løvqvist (DEN)

=== Gold medal match ===
September 25, 1994; 17:00	Denmark	27 – 23	Germany	Berlin; Attendance: 4000; Referees: Peter Brussel, Anton van Dongen (NED)
September 25, 1994; 17:00	Andersen 7	(14–13)	Zienkiewics 6	Berlin; Attendance: 4000; Referees: Peter Brussel, Anton van Dongen (NED)
September 25, 1994; 17:00	2× (yellow card) 5× (suspension) 1× (red card)	Report	3× (yellow card) 3× (suspension) 0× (red card)	Berlin; Attendance: 4000; Referees: Peter Brussel, Anton van Dongen (NED)

== Final ranking ==
1st place, gold medalist(s)	Denmark
2nd place, silver medalist(s)	Germany
3rd place, bronze medalist(s)	Norway
4	Hungary
5	Croatia
6	Russia
7	Sweden
8	Czech Republic
9	Austria
10	Romania
11	Ukraine
12	Slovakia

1994 Women's European champions

Denmark
1st title

Lene Rantala, Anne Dorthe Tanderup, Rikke Solberg, Camilla Andersen, Tonje Kjærgaard, Anette Hoffmann, Anja Byrial Hansen, Marianne Florman, Janne Kolling, Conny Hamann, Anja Andersen, Gitte Sunesen, Susanne Boilesen, Heidi Astrup, Marlene Jensen, Susanne Munk Lauritsen, Head coach: Ulrik Wilbek.
