= 1997 World Women's Handball Championship squads =

List of handball players

The following squads and players competed in the World Women's Handball Championship in 1997 in Germany.

== Algeria ==
1. Houda Benachi
2. Samia Saidji
3. Samia Boukais
4. Dahbia Mehanek
5. Nbila Chibani
6. Lynda Cherik
7. Nadjia Attafene
8. Feriel Amoura
9. Aicha Kouta
10. Nadre Aouka
11. Karima Toudjine
12. Ouafa Mekaissi
13. Feriel Choukri
14. Fathia Neggazi
15. Meriéme Khalil
16. Nacèra Touati

== Angola ==
1. Maria Vanga
2. Justina Jose Joaquim Lopez Praca
3. Anica Miguel Joao Neto
4. Ilda Maria Bengue
5. Felisbela Teixeira
6. Filomena Jose Trindade
7. Maria Teresa Neto Joaquim
8. Teresa Ulundo
9. Elisa Webba
10. Ivone Mufuca
11. Maria Cordeiro
12. Teresa Moco
13. Palmira Barbosa
14. Maria Ines Jololo
15. Domingas Cordeiro

== Austria ==
1. Sylvia Kundt
2. Tatjana Dschandschgawa
3. Rima Sypkus
4. Stephanie Ofenböck
5. Doris Meltzer
6. Sorina Lefter
7. Barbara Strass
8. Magda Materzok
9. Edith Mika
10. Sylvia Strass
11. Laura Fritz
12. Stanka Božović
13. Iris Morhammer
14. Renata Cieloch

== Belarus ==
1. Natallia Petrakova
2. Marina Bratenkova
3. Raissa Tikhonovich
4. Alla Vaskova
5. Natallia Sysoyeva
6. Larysa Mezhinskaya
7. Antonia Tchibangou
8. Irina Tchernevskaia
9. Tatjana Doudkina
10. Natallia Tsvirko
11. Tatsiana Silitch
12. Tatjana Karovina
13. Elena Korzun
14. Svetlana Minevskaia

== Brazil ==
1. Cristina Silva
2. Nivia Da Cruz
3. Rose Silva
4. Soraya Da Silva
5. Maria De Sales
6. Margarete Lobo Montao
7. Dilane Azambuja Roese
8. Veronica Gomes
9. Vanessa Veiga
10. Valeria De Oliveira
11. Idalina Borges Mesquita
12. Sandra De Oliveira

== Canada ==
1. Marie-Claude Gibeau
2. Sharon Deir
3. France Brunet
4. Fabienne Raphael
5. Cyndie Drolet
6. Nancy Karpinsky
7. Héléne Gravel
8. Amélie Champagne
9. Dominique Boivin
10. Julie Hébert
11. Caroline Pilon
12. Véronique Mongrain
13. Mirjana Jurcic
14. Nathalie Brochu
15. Caroline Coté

== China ==
1. Xiajiong Wang
2. Ge Li Yu
3. Bing Li
4. Li Zhang
5. Lie Chen
6. Che Zhihong
7. Cong Yanxia
8. Chao Zhai
9. Cailing Xu
10. Li Jianfang
11. Wei Shi
12. Chen Haiyun
13. Zhang Geng
14. Ji Chen

== Croatia ==
1. Ana Maljko
2. Barbara Jovicic
3. Moira Botica
4. Klaudija Klikovac-Bubalo
5. Marija Celina
6. Samira Hasagic
7. Renata Pavlacic
8. Natasa Kolega
9. Helena Lulic
10. Vesna Horacek
11. Vlatka Mihoci
12. Djana Ivandija
13. Renata Damjanic
14. Snjezana Petika
15. Bozica Greguric

== Czech Republic ==
1. Lenka Cerna
2. Marketa Myslivcova
3. Zuzana Pospisilova
4. Erika Koberova
5. Renata Cileckova
6. Monika Ludmilova
7. Lenka Romanova
8. Jarmila Majickova
9. Gabriela Korandova
10. Petra Valova
11. Marie Libanska
12. Nadezda Krejcirikova
13. Petra Cumplova
14. Gabriela Bartuskova
15. Jana Arnosova

== Denmark ==
No.	Pos.	Name	Date of birth (age)	Height	App.	Goals	Club
1	GK	Lene Rantala	10 August 1968 (aged 29)
2		Anne Dorthe Tanderup (captain)	24 April 1972 (aged 25)
3		Helle Simonsen	27 August 1976 (aged 21)
4	CB	Camilla Andersen	5 July 1973 (aged 24)
5	RB	Tina Bøttzau	29 August 1971 (aged 26)
6	LW	Anette Hoffmann-Möberg	5 May 1971 (aged 26)
8	LW	Lone Mathiesen	28 January 1972 (aged 25)
9	RW	Janne Kolling	12 July 1968 (aged 29)
10	CB	Merete Möller	7 May 1978 (aged 19)
11	LB	Anja Andersen	15 February 1969 (aged 28)
12	GK	Gitte Sunesen	11 December 1971 (aged 25)
13		Gitte Madsen	24 March 1969 (aged 28)
15	P	Tonje Kjaergaard	11 June 1975 (aged 22)
16	GK	Susanne Munk Lauritsen	12 October 1967 (aged 30)
18	P	Maybrit Nielsen	30 November 1968 (aged 29)
19		Karina Jespersen	20 March 1975 (aged 22)

== France ==
1. Valérie Nicolas (GK)
2. Irina Popova (GK)
3. Catherine Pibarot
4. Florence Sauval
5. Sandrine Mariot Delerce
6. Anne Loaëc (GK)
7. Véronique Pecqueux
8. Nathalie Selambarom
9. Leila Duchemann
10. Nodjialem Myaro
11. Myriam Korfanty
12. Stéphanie Cano
13. Isabelle Wendling
14. Chantal Maio
15. Stéphanie Ludwig
16. Véronique Demonière

== Germany ==
1. Michaela Schanze
2. Emilia Luca
3. Manuela Fiedel
4. Anna Osiakowska
5. Sandra Polchow
6. Christine Lindemann
7. Miroslava Ritskiavitchius
8. Grit Jurack
9. Annika Schafferus
10. Silvia Schmitt
11. Michaela Erler
12. Kathrin Blacha
13. Franziska Heinz
14. Yvonne Karrasch
15. Heike Schmidt
16. Agnieszka Tobiasz

== Hungary ==
1. Andrea Farkas
2. Anikó Meksz
3. Melinda Tóth-Szabó
4. Anita Kulcsár
5. Ildikó Pádár
6. Gabriella Takács
7. Helga Németh
8. Beatrix Balogh
9. Ágnes Farkas
10. Éva Erdős
11. Rita Borók
12. Zsófia Pásztor
13. Fanni Kenyeres
14. Rita Deli
15. Katalin Pálinger
16. Anikó Kántor

== Ivory Coast ==
1. Elisabeth Kouassi
2. Emma Marcelle Negle
3. Alimata Dosso
4. Aimée Candide Zanzan
5. Adéline Koudou
6. Elizabeth Fawon Sokouri
7. Tapé Catherine Sery
8. Laurette Bodoua
9. Sidonie Lourougnon
10. Etche Philomène Koko
11. Marie-Ange Gogbe
12. Wandou Guchi
13. Adélaide Tibe
14. Paula Arlette Gondo
15. Alice Koudougnon
16. Celine Affoua Dongo

== Japan ==
1. Michiko Yamashita
2. Ayako Yamaguchi
3. Keiko Tamura
4. Akane Aoto
5. Emiko Kamide
6. Emi Matsumoto
7. Nana Sugihara
8. Mineko Tanaka
9. Miyoko Tanaka
10. Kanako Tsuji
11. Yumiko Tanaka
12. Mie Fujiura
13. Hitomi Sakugawa

== Macedonia ==
1. Gordana Naceva
2. Oksana Maslova
3. Ljubica Georgievska
4. Biljana Naumoska
5. Marina Abramova
6. Mileva Velkova
7. Mirjana Čupić
8. Nadja Tasci
9. Indira Kastratović
10. Dana Filipovska
11. Valentina Radulović
12. Larisa Kiselyova
13. Klara Boeva

== Norway ==
1. Heidi Tjugum
2. Jeanette Nilsen
3. Tonje Larsen
4. Janne Tuven
5. Susann Goksør Bjerkrheim
6. Kari Solem Aune
7. Sahra Hausmann
8. Hege Kvitsand
9. Mette Davidsen
10. Trine Haltvik
11. Ellen Mitchell
12. Annette Tveter
13. Lise Kristiansen
14. Tonje Sagstuen
15. Monica Vik Gabrielsen

== Poland ==
1. Iwona Pabich
2. Izabela Czapko
3. Monika Studzinska
4. Agata Szukielowicz
5. Monika Wicha
6. Aleksandra Pawelska
7. Anna Garwacka
8. Katarzyna Szklarczuk
9. Sabina Soja
10. Agnieszka Beata Matuszewska
11. Joanna Jurkiewicz
12. Renata Zukiel
13. Justyna Sebrala
14. Sylwia Pociecha

== Romania ==
1. Carmen Petca
2. Mihaela Ciobanu
3. Valeria Motogna
4. Simona Gogirla
5. Olimpia Veres
6. Elena Iorgu
7. Mariana Tirca
8. Luminita Stroe
9. Mihaela Apostol
10. Alina-Ileana Jula
11. Alina Nicoleta Dobrin
12. Lacramioara Lazar
13. Roxana Stanisor
14. Steluta Lazar
15. Magdalena Urdea

== Russia ==
1. Stella Vartanian
2. Natalia Gritsenko
3. Tatiana Berezniak
4. Natalya Deriouguina
5. Liudmila Bodnieva
6. Irina Akhromeeva
7. Raissa Verakso
8. Olga Evtcherenko
9. Lyudmyla Shevchenko
10. Irina Kalinitchenko
11. Zhanna Sabadash
12. Natalia Malakhova
13. Svetlana Smirnova

== Slovenia ==
1. Mojca Brezovar
2. Sergeja Stefanisin
3. Mojca Dercar
4. Natasa Mezek
5. Marjeta Marton
6. Darja Skopelja
7. Sonia Zidar
8. Branka Mijatovic
9. Deja Doler
10. Anja Freser
11. Tatjana Oder
12. Simona Sturm
13. Katja Kurent
14. Irma Kapidzic
15. Tina Randl
16. Andreja Verbinc

== South Korea ==
1. Young-Ran Oh
2. Nam-Soo Lee
3. Hye-Jeong Kwag
4. Soung-Yeol Oh
5. Soon-Ja Cho
6. Rang Kim
7. Eun-Gyung Kim
8. Eun-Mi Kim
9. Hyun-Ok Kim
10. Hyang-Ok Kim
11. Choeng-Shim Kim
12. Jeong-Ho Hong
13. Sun-Hee Han
14. Soon-Young Huh
15. Sang-Eun Lee

== Uruguay ==
1. Elena Salgado
2. Alejandra Varela
3. Silvana Renom
4. Marcela Schelotto
5. Isabel Crocci
6. Maria Cecilia Del Campo
7. Silvana De Armas
8. Gabriela Sebasti
9. Mercedes Amor
10. M. Jose Del Campo
11. Sabrina Mujica
12. Cecilia Lapetina
13. Lorena Estefanell
14. Lucia Curbello
15. Sofia Griot

== Uzbekistan ==
1. Irina Skulkova
2. Olga Suslina
3. Anna Zikova
4. Nadezhda Kelasyeva
5. Tatjana Firsova
6. Aziza Abzalova
7. Irina Voronova
8. Olga Atilina
9. Elena Vasilenko
10. Viktoria Jorjoladze
11. Olga Adjiderskaya
