= Chen Shu =

Chen Shu may refer to:

- Book of Chen, a historical text about the Chen dynasty, also known as Chen Shu
- Chen Shu (painter) (1660–1736), Qing dynasty painter
- Chen Shu (actress) (born 1977), Chinese singer and actress
- Chen Shu (actor) (陈述; 1920–2006), Chinese actor
