= Susann Müller =

German handball player and coach (born 1988)

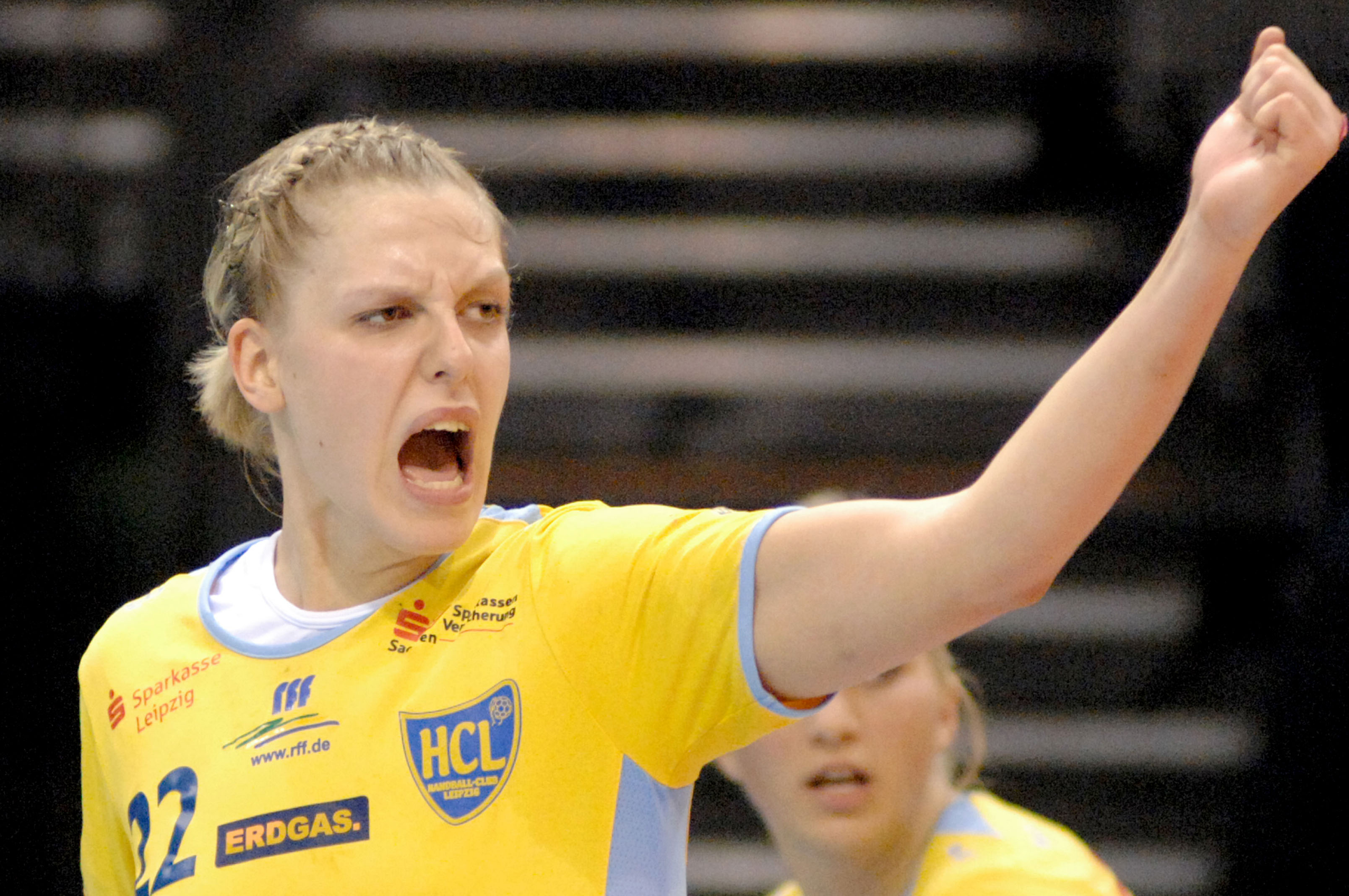

Personal information
- Nationality: German
- Born: 26 May 1988 (age 38) Saalfeld, East Germany
- Height: 1.86 m (6 ft 1 in)

Sport
- Sport: Handball
- Position: Right back

Youth career
- Years: Team
- 1996–2003: 1.SSV Saalfeld
- 2003–2006: HC Leipzig

Senior clubs
- Years: Team
- 2006–2010: HC Leipzig
- 2010–2011: SK Aarhus
- 2011–2012: Randers HK
- 2012–2013: RK Krim
- 2013–2014: HC Leipzig
- 2014–2015: Győri ETO KC
- 2015–2018: SG BBM Bietigheim
- 2018–2019: Silkeborg-Voel KFUM
National team
Years	Team	Apps	(Gls)
2007–2016	Germany	92	(331)

Teams managed
- 2019–: Füchse Berlin (w)
Medal record
World Championship
Bronze medal – third place	2007 France
Junior World Championship
Gold medal – first place	2008 Macedonia

Susann Müller (born 26 May 1988) is a retired German handball player and coach, who coaches the women's team of Füchse Berlin.

On club level, Müller played for a number of top teams across Europe, winning league titles in Denmark, Germany and Slovenia. A German international since her youth, she was bronze medalist at the 2007 World Championship and won the Junior World Championship title in 2008. A prolific left-handed shooter, Müller was the top scorer of the 2013 World Championship and was selected in the All-Star team of the tournament. With her performances, she also earned the Handballer of the Year title in Germany in 2013.

== Career ==
=== Club ===
Müller began to play handball at the age of seven by local club 1.SSV Saalfeld, before in 2003 she switched to Bundesliga club HC Leipzig. Initially, she was part of the youth section of the club and was promoted to the senior team for the 2006–2007 Bundesliga season. She scored over 60 goals in the first part of the season, whereupon she got a contract extension until 2010. During her spell at the club, Müller won two league and two national cup titles, as well as the German Supercup title in 2008.

In 2010, Müller signed to Danish club SK Århus to be closer to her partner Nina Wörz, who played for Randers HK that time. However, due to Århus' financial difficulties Müller left the club after one season and eventually joined Randers HK. In the 2011–12 season, she led Randers to Danish league title, being the club's top scorer with 124 goals. In the following year, she moved to Slovenia to play for RK Krim, but she returned to Leipzig at the end of the season. Müller's second spell at the club lasted for one year, during which period she collected another silverware by winning the German Cup. In the summer of 2014, she was signed by Hungarian top club Győri ETO KC as a replacement for Katarina Bulatović. However, she and the club terminated her contract shortly thereafter.

After a stint in SG BBM Bietigheim that saw her winning the 2016-17 season of the Bundesliga where she became the league as well as the EHF Cup topscorer, she eventually moved back to the Danish league for the 2018–19 season to play for Silkeborg-Voel KFUM.

=== National team ===
Müller was part of the German youth setup since the youngest age categories. In youth handball, she achieved her biggest success in 2008 when she won the Junior World Championship in Macedonia. With seven goals she was the top scorer of the German team in the final, that stunned favorite Denmark 23–22.

In 2006, she was already selected in the wider 24-man squad for the European Championship by head coach Armin Emrich, but she was eventually left out from the travelling squad. Müller finally made her full international debut on 18 October 2007 against Japan. She made it to the German team for the 2007 World Championship; she played six matches at the tournament, scoring two goals and winning the bronze medal. A year later, Müller decided not to participate at the 2008 European Championship, claiming she needs a break after a long and exhausting three-years period behind her.

Müller was back in the German squad for the 2009 World Championship held in China; Germany finished seventh and, with 34 goals, Müller was the second-best scorer of the team behind Franziska Mietzner. Müller and Germany went to the 2010 European Women's Handball Championship with medal hopes; however, they suffered a surprise early exit after the group stage.

Müller missed the 2011 World Championship and the 2012 European Championship due to injuries; however, she returned at the 2013 World Championship in great form – with 62 goals she became the top scorer of the tournament and was further elected to the All-Star team. Germany eventually finished seventh at the championship.

== Personal life ==
Müller married fellow handball player and former teammate, Nina Wörz, in 2016.

== Achievements ==
=== Club ===
- EHF Cup:
  - Runner-up: 2008-9, 2016–17
- Bundesliga:
  - Winner: 2009, 2010, 2017
- DHB-Pokal:
  - Winner: 2007, 2008, 2014
- DHB-Supercup:
  - Winner: 2008
- Damehåndboldligaen:
  - Winner: 2012
- Slovenian First League of Handball:
  - Winner: 2013
- Slovenian Cup:
  - Winner: 2013

=== National team ===
- World Championship:
  - Bronze Medalist: 2007
- Junior World Championship:
  - Winner: 2008

== Individual awards ==
- World Championship Top Scorer: 2013
- All-Star Right Back of the World Championship: 2013
- German Handballer of the Year: 2013
- EHF Cup Top Scorer: 2017
- HTH Ligaen's Player of the Month: April 2019
