= Markus Gaugisch =

German handball coach (born 1974)

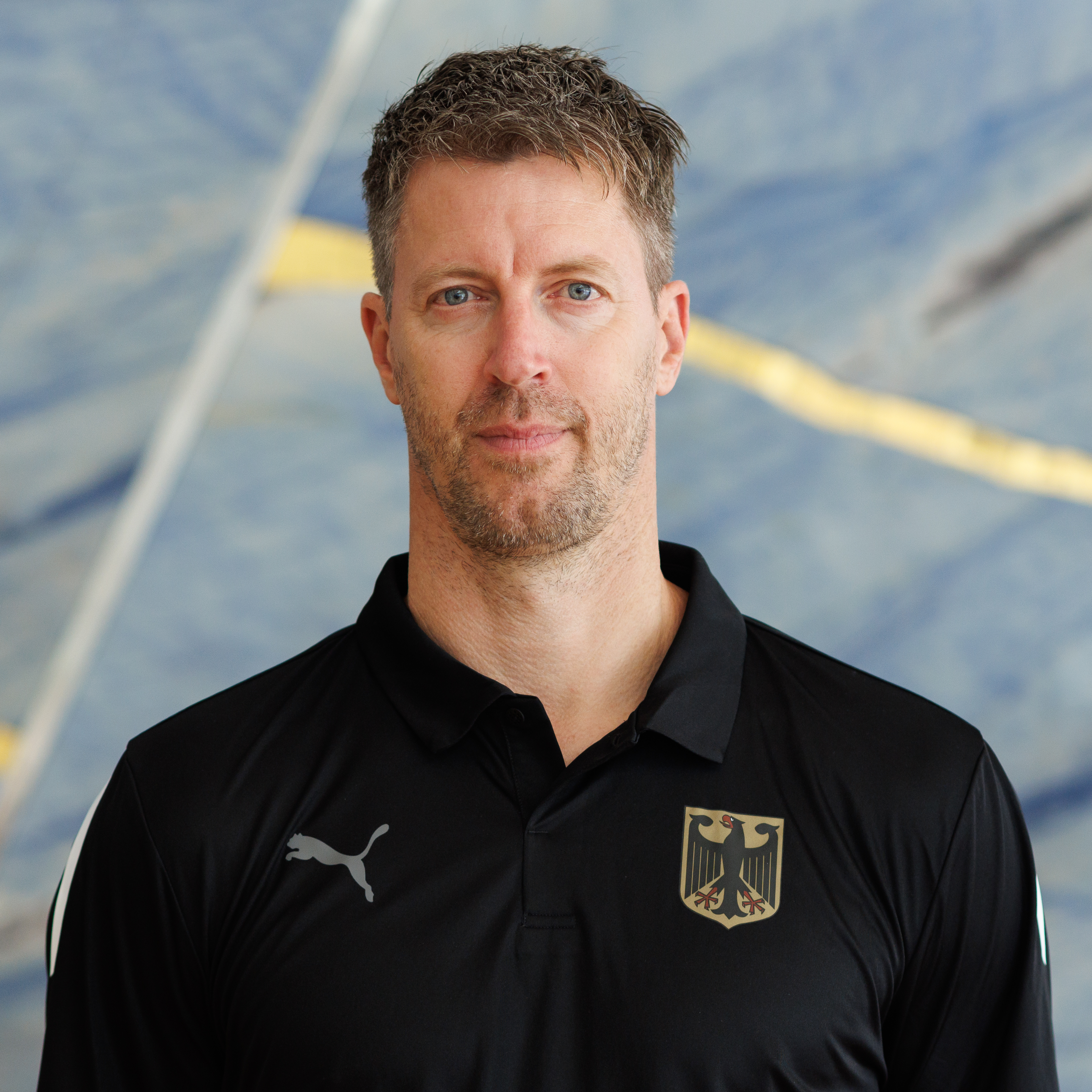
- Gaugisch (2024)

Personal information
- Nationality: German
- Born: 20 April 1974 (age 52) Göppingen, Germany
- Height: 1.92 m (6 ft 4 in)

Sport
- Sport: Handball
- Position: Right back / Left back
- Current club: Germany women

Youth career
- Years: Team
- –: TV Schlat
- –: TSV Heiningen

Senior clubs
- Years: Team
- –1996: TSV Scharnhausen
- 1995–2006: VfL Pfullingen
- 2006–2007: TV 1893 Neuhausen

Teams managed
- 2008–2009: TV 1893 Neuhausen Assistant
- 2009–2013: TV 1893 Neuhausen
- 2013–2015: HBW Balingen-Weilstetten
- 2020–2023: SG BBM Bietigheim
- 2022–: Germany women
Medal record
World Championship
Silver medal – second place	2025 Netherlands/Germany

Markus Gaugisch (born 20 April 1974) is a German handball coach and former player, who is currently the head coach of the Germany women's national team.

== Playing career ==
Gaugisch started his career at TSV Heiningen where he won the 1993 youth championship. He later joined TSV Scharnhausen before joining 2nd Bundesliga team VfL Pfullingen. Here he won the 2006 2nd Bundesliga.

The following season he joined 3. Liga team TV 1893 Neuhausen. He retired in 2007.

== Coaching career ==
After his playing days he became the assistant coach behind Kurt Reusch at TV 1893 Neuhausen where he became the head coach in 2009. The team had just been promoted to the 2nd Bundesliga. In the 2011–12 season he led the club to a third place finish and thus secured promotion to the Handball-Bundesliga.

The following season the club did however finish 17th and was thus relegated.

Gaugisch then joined Bundesliga team HBW Balingen-Weilstetten. He left the club in 2015.

In 2020 he joined the Women's Bundesliga team SG BBM Bietigheim. He led the team to the Bundesliga title in 2022 and 2023, the DHB-Pokal in 2021, 2022 and 2023, the DHB-Supercup in 2021. He also won EHF European League in 2022.

In April 2022 he took the head coach position at the Germany women's national team, replacing Henk Groener. At the 2023 World Championship he guided the team to a 6th place. Following the successful qualification for the 2024 Olympics, he prolonged his contract until 2026. At the tournament, Germany reached the quarter finals, losing to France.

At the 2024 European Women's Handball Championship Germany got to the main round.

A year later he led Germany at the 2025 World Women's Handball Championship. Here Germany reached the final, where they lost to Norway. This was the first time since 1994 that Germany made the final of a major international tournament and the first time they won a medal since 2007.

== Private ==
His son, Kalle Gaugisch, is also a handball player.
