= Ariosto Pallamano Ferrara =

GS Ariosto Pallamano Ferrara
- Full name: Ariosto Pallamano Ferrara
- Founded: 1978
- Arena: Palestra il Boschetto
- Capacity: 400
- League: Serie A
- 2015-2016: 4th

Ariosto Pallamano Ferrara is a women's handball club from Ferrara in Italia. Ariosto Pallamano Ferrara competes in the Serie A.

== European record ==
Season	Competition	Round	Club	Home	Away	Aggregate
2016–17	Challenge Cup	R2	(Switzerland) DHB Rotweiss Thun	24–28	17–34	41–56

== Team ==
=== Current squad ===
Squad for the 2016–17 season

Goalkeepers

- (Italy) Paula Gambera
- (Italy) Melanie Pernthaler

Wingers
RW

- (Italy) Ilenia Ceso

LW

- (Italy) Giulia Burgio
- (Italy) Nicoletta Marchegiani
- (Italy) Anica Maria Sandri
- (Italy) Flavia Spasari

Line Players

- (Italy) Sofia Belardinelli
- (Italy) Alice Grossi
- (Italy) Beatrice Piva

Back players
LB

- (Bulgaria) Neli Dobreva
- (Italy) Margherita Stampi

CB

- (Italy) Rocio Barros

RB

- (Italy) Nadja Abfalterer
- (Italy) Celeste Meccia
- (Italy) Katia Soglietti

== Notable former players ==
- (Denmark) Karina Brygmann-Jespersen
- (Argentina) Macarena Gandulfo
