= 2012–13 Handball-Bundesliga =

Handball-Bundesliga
- Season: 2012–13
- Champions: THW Kiel
- Relegated: TV Großwallstadt; TV 1893 Neuhausen; TUSEM Essen
- EHF Champions League: THW Kiel; SG Flensburg-Handewitt; HSV Hamburg; Füchse Berlin
- EHF Cup: Rhein-Neckar Löwen; TSV Hannover-Burgdorf
- Matches: 306
- Goals: 17,206 (56.23 per match)
- Top goalscorer: (Denmark) Hans Lindberg (235 goals)
- Average attendance: 4,554

The 2012–13 Handball-Bundesliga was the 48th season of the Handball-Bundesliga, Germany's premier handball league, and the 36th season consisting of only one league.

== Team information ==
Location of teams in the Handball-Bundesliga

Team	Location	Arena	Capacity
Frisch Auf Göppingen	Göppingen	EWS Arena	4,300
Füchse Berlin	Berlin	Max-Schmeling-Halle	8,500
SC Magdeburg	Magdeburg	GETEC Arena	7,782
TuS Nettelstedt-Lübbecke	Lübbecke	Merkur Arena	3,300
HSV Hamburg	Hamburg	O2 World Hamburg	13,000
HSG Wetzlar	Wetzlar	RITTAL Arena	4,412
HBW Balingen-Weilstetten	Balingen	Sparkassen-Arena	2,000
Rhein-Neckar Löwen	Mannheim	SAP Arena	14,500
SG Flensburg-Handewitt	Flensburg	Campushalle/Flens-Arena	6,300
TBV Lemgo	Lemgo	Lipperlandhalle	5,000
THW Kiel	Kiel	Sparkassen-Arena	10,250
TSV Hannover-Burgdorf	Hannover	AWD Hall	4,200
MT Melsungen	Kassel	Rothenbach-Halle	4,300
TV Großwallstadt	Elsenfeld	Sparkassen-Arena	4,200
VfL Gummersbach	Gummersbach	Eugen-Haas-Halle	2,100
TUSEM Essen	Essen	Sportpark am Hallo	2,500
GWD Minden	Minden	Kampa-Halle	4,059
TV 1893 Neuhausen	Tübingen	Paul Horn-Arena	2,348

== Standings ==
Pos	Team	Pld	W	D	L	GF	GA	GD	Pts
1	THW Kiel	34	30	1	3	1122	889	+223	61:7
2	SG Flensburg-Handewitt	34	25	4	5	1033	862	+171	54:14
3	Rhein-Neckar Löwen	34	25	4	5	965	850	+115	54:14
4	Füchse Berlin	34	24	3	7	976	892	+84	51:17
5	HSV Hamburg	34	22	5	7	1035	944	+91	49:19
6	TSV Hannover-Burgdorf	34	21	4	9	1021	1002	+19	46:22
7	HSG Wetzlar	34	17	3	14	996	975	+21	37:31
8	SC Magdeburg	34	16	4	14	955	918	+37	36:32
9	TBV Lemgo	34	15	4	15	921	927	−6	34:34
10	MT Melsungen	34	15	5	14	945	947	−2	33:35
11	Frisch Auf Göppingen	34	15	2	17	950	905	+45	32:36
12	TuS Nettelstedt-Lübbecke	34	13	2	19	961	988	−27	28:40
13	HBW Balingen-Weilstetten	34	11	3	20	956	1019	−63	25:43
14	GWD Minden	34	6	6	22	880	1009	−129	18:50
15	VfL Gummersbach	34	6	4	24	887	1018	−131	16:52
16	TV Großwallstadt	34	6	3	25	848	946	−98	15:53
17	TV 1893 Neuhausen	34	7	1	26	885	1042	−157	15:53
18	TUSEM Essen	34	3	2	29	870	1063	−193	8:60

== Results ==
Home \ Away	FAG	BER	GWD	HBW	HSG	HSV	MTM	RNL	SCM	SGF	TBV	THW	TSV	TUS	ESS	TVN	TVG	VFL
Göppingen		32–34	28–28	33–22	23–27	34–26	20–27	25–30	28–26	27–32	33–28	33–29	28–31	29–22	35–19	32–26	38–20	29–32
Berlin	29–26		29–25	27–26	27–28	37–27	27–27	32–26	29–26	16–27	21–19	26–26	27–28	35–25	32–25	36–25	30–21	29–28
Minden	26–32	27–31		31–31	35–26	22–34	26–24	23–26	26–26	29–30	21–21	32–36	27–30	32–31	30–26	28–23	26–24	27–31
Balingen	29–25	29–29	33–33		26–28	31–35	29–34	33–34	33–27	29–30	29–27	22–34	33–35	33–24	29–23	32–26	30–24	29–25
Wetzlar	30–27	25–27	32–28	29–32		33–26	29–26	23–29	27–28	31–31	31–28	26–27	27–31	31–28	33–33	35–25	26–25	38–32
Hamburg	30–29	28–25	33–21	32–19	30–29		38–27	23–30	31–19	25–25	34–31	30–33	26–26	26–31	41–34	30–27	29–19	32–31
Melsungen	28–25	24–30	26–21	31–29	28–25	30–30		23–26	26–31	26–26	29–34	29–33	26–26	32–28	27–25	36–25	32–24	32–27
Löwen	26–26	25–23	32–22	35–22	31–29	28–34	27–22		30–22	30–27	31–26	17–28	39–28	24–19	29–21	30–25	26–21	27–22
Magdeburg	PPD	31–33	26–18	36–30	24–26	28–29	34–30	20–20		34–32	27–24	23–32	34–31	29–29	35–25	35–24	33–25	41–31
Flensburg	29–25	29–18	30–19	39–24	36–27	23–23	35–29	30–27	30–24		33–22	35–29	32–26	30–28	40–20	37–26	26–20	25–20
Lemgo	25–22	21–27	32–25	27–26	30–27	29–35	31–28	27–27	26–28	27–22		28–31	30–32	29–32	24–23	31–25	33–28	30–25
Kiel	36–25	40–33	37–26	33–25	37–31	30–27	25–29	31–25	33–30	34–27	36–24		39–29	30–23	33–23	29–21	34–23	36–19
Hannover	31–28	30–31	33–26	25–20	29–29	26–30	29–25	26–32	30–28	29–28	28–28	30–36		37–31	34–24	33–29	31–27	33–28
Lübbecke	24–34	29–33	34–23	30–31	29–30	32–33	28–24	24–24	29–24	24–33	23–25	29–33	36–28		34–27	29–26	28–33	29–26
Essen	25–37	24–31	28–22	30–28	26–36	26–34	29–31	20–30	26–32	24–27	21–30	25–37	32–33	30–35		27–28	22–27	28–28
Neuhausen	24–28	22–29	34–28	34–29	23–31	28–28	26–29	21–32	26–32	26–37	21–23	20–39	31–32	27–28	24–32		32–27	29–26
Großwallstadt	27–28	18–25	35–22	28–23	28–26	30–31	23–23	24–30	25–25	23–29	21–26	29–32	26–31	23–24	28–20	26–28		22–22
Gummersbach	27–26	23–28	25–25	26–30	30–35	31–35	26–25	28–30	24–37	21–31	25–25	25–34	29–30	24–32	29–27	26–28	25–24	

Source: flashscore
Legend: Blue = home team win; Yellow = draw; Red = away team win.
