= Chen Shu (painter) =

Chinese artist (1660–1736)

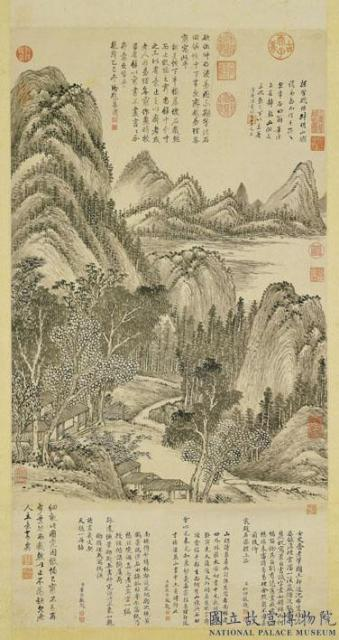
Reading the I-ching in a Mountain Study (山窗讀易圖)

Chen Shu (simplified Chinese: 陈书; traditional Chinese: 陳書; pinyin: Chén Shū; 1660–1735) was a female Chinese painter during the early Qing dynasty. She was born in Xiuzhou (now Jiaxing) and was also known by the courtesy name Nanlou and her literary names "Shangyuan Dizi" and "Nanlou Laoren". She is considered the first female painter of Qing dynasty as well as the inaugurator of Xiushui School painting style. Apart from her artistic works, she was also known as the mother of Qing statesman and poet Qian Chenqun (zh:钱陈群). After the early death of her husband, Chen raised her son by herself. When the latter became a prominent statesman in the court of the Qianlong Emperor, he introduced the emperor to his mother's paintings. Through this avenue she became favored by Qianlong, and many of her works were featured in the imperial collection (today in both the Palace Museum in Beijing and the National Palace Museum in Taipei). Chen painted figures, landscapes, and flower-and-bird paintings.

== Biography ==
Pine and Chrysanthemums (1705)

Her son's biography portrays Chen Shu as an "exemplar of Confucian virtue." In his Biography, Qian Chenqun describes his mother's success in the art world, the cultivation of her talent, and her artistic influence over the next generations of her husband's family. Her skills, he claimed, were from "her distinguished heredity, fine upbringing, and a bit of divine intervention." He further describes the supernatural events leading to her interest and success in the field of art. Her son also noted her works of charity by helping to feed the poor, as well as her ability to add wealth to her family through her art, which made her an example of a good Confucian wife.

== Early life ==
Chen Shu was born into an elite family in Jiaxing, Zhejiang province. Having an artist as a father, she was able to self-study in painting as a young girl. Due to mixed feelings about women's education at the time, education was available to only a few women of the elite. Unaccepting of traditional female roles of the time, Chen Shu pursued the arts and classics rather than other more “feminine” interests. In some cases during this time, men preferred a well-educated wife who not only could relate to her husband's interests but also could educate their children. Chen Shu was able to help her family by selling her paintings for profits and being a teacher to her children. She even took on a few disciples from her family to tutor in painting, one of whom was Qian Weicheng who later achieved renown in his own right. She also tutored renowned collector and art historian Zhang Geng, an adopted son in her husband's family.

== Later life ==
Later in life, Chen Shu focused on landscape paintings. Landscape paintings by women during this time were rare because women were unable to travel as often as men. Though Chen Shu most likely did not have much chance to travel due to her sex, she took the time to study landscape painting of male artists. "At her advanced Grandmotherly age, she was most likely in the tranquility of her, garden paint[ing] as her male literati counterparts did, to amuse herself".

== Famous works ==
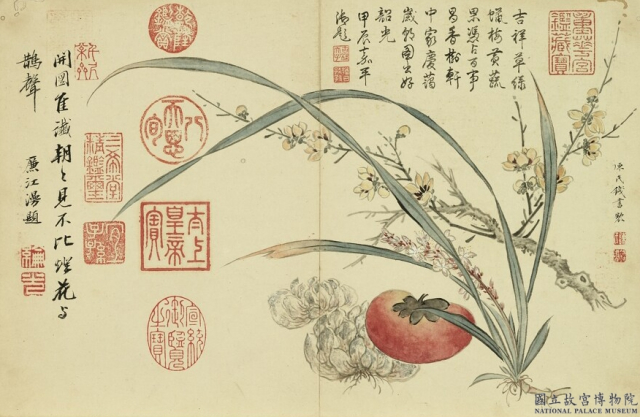
Auspicious Flowers (吉祥花)

Like other literati painters of this time, Chen Shu would reference famous artists in her work. For example, in her painting Landscape in the Style of Wang Meng, Chen Shu was working in the style of famous Yuan dynasty artist Wang Meng. This idea is seen by her use of a vertical format with a dense wooded landscape. Though she is referencing this great master, Chen Shu adds her own marks to the painting, for example her," formulaic strokes that create a smooth and orderly pattern on the boulders and foliage." Other imitative paintings of Wang's include, Dwelling in the Mountains on a Summer Day and The Mountains Are Quiet and the Days Grow Long. In both of these works, subtle differences can be found from the originals, this is due to the difference in Chen Shu's style and that she was most likely unable to see the original paintings by Wang Meng. Chen Shu also enjoyed referencing the Wu School of Suzhou, who were active in the Ming dynasty. They influenced her flower and landscape paintings. One of her most appreciated works in this style was her painting Reading the I-ching in a Mountain Study. When looking at the style of the mountains, one can also see the influence of Wang Meng still appearing in her works. Chen Shu's next most popular iconography is the depiction of flowers. She painted many images of flowers and birds including works like, Iris and Roses, Vegetables, Fruit, and Asters, and one of her most iconic, The White Cockatoo. This image of a beautiful bird and flowers is based on Song dynasty painting, when this imagery first became popular. Its composition is similar to that of Emperor Huizong of Song, who was also a renowned artist, though it is not noted to be a copy of his work specifically.
