= Helle Simonsen =

Helle Simonsen may refer to:

- Helle Simonsen (curler) (born 1984), Danish curler
- Helle Simonsen (handballer) (born 1976), Danish handball player
