= Agnieszka Tobiasz =

German/Polish handball player (born 1973)

Personal information
- Nationality: German/Polish
- Born: 29 March 1973 (age 53) Swidnica, Poland

Sport
- Sport: Handball
- Position: Back

Senior clubs
- Years: Team
- 1994–2003: TV Lützellinden
- 2003–2007: 1. FC Nürnberg
National team
- Years: Team
- –: Poland
- –: Germany

Agnieszka Tobiasz (née Zienkiewicz, 29 March 1973) is a German/Polish former handball player.

== Career ==
Tobiasz started playing handball at the age of 10. From 1994 to 2003 she played for TV Lützellinden, where she won 3 German Championships, as well as the 1995-96 EHF Cup Winners' Cup.

She then joined 1. FC Nürnberg, where she played until 2007. Here she won 2 additional German Championships as well as the DHB-Pokal twice.

== National team ==
Tobiasz represented both the Polish and German national team. She represented Poland at the 1993 World Women's Handball Championship, where they finished 10th.

At the 1997 World Championship she won bronze medals with the German team. Two years later she was part of the German team that finished 7th at the 1999 World Women's Handball Championship.

At the 2000 European Championship she was included in the tournament all-star team. Germany finished 10th at the tournament.

== Titles ==
- EHF Cup Winners Cup: 1996
- German Championship: 1997, 2000, 2001, 2005, 2007
- German Cup: 2004, 2005
