= 2000 European Women's Handball Championship =

2000 EHF European Women's Handball Championship

Tournament details
- Host country: Romania
- Dates: 8–17 December
- Teams: 12 (from 1 confederation)

Final positions
- Champions: Hungary (1st title)
- Runners-up: Ukraine
- Third place: Russia
- Fourth place: Romania

Tournament statistics
- Matches played: 38
- Goals scored: 1,927 (50.71 per match)
- Top scorers: Simona Gogîrlă (ROU) (68 goals)

Awards
- Best player: Beáta Siti (HUN)

The 2000 EHF European Women's Handball Championship was held in Romania from 8 to 17 December. It was won by Hungary by beating Ukraine 32–30 after extra time in the final match.

== Venues ==
The teams of the tournament were divided into two groups. The matches of Group A took place in the city of Râmnicu Vâlcea, while Group B games and the final round were played in the capital city, Bucharest.

== Qualification ==
Country	Qualified as	Previous appearances in tournament
Romania	Host	3 (1994, 1996, 1998)
Norway	Defending champion	3 (1994, 1996, **1998**)
Austria	Playoff winner	3 (1994, 1996, 1998)
Belarus	Playoff winner	0 (Debut)
Denmark	Playoff winner	3 (**1994**, **1996**, 1998)
France	Playoff winner	0 (Debut)
Germany	Playoff winner	3 (1994, 1996, 1998)
Hungary	Playoff winner	3 (1994, 1996, 1998)
Macedonia	Playoff winner	1 (1998)
Russia	Playoff winner	3 (1994, 1996, 1998)
Ukraine	Playoff winner	3 (1994, 1996, 1998)
Yugoslavia	Playoff winner	0 (Debut)

Note: Bold indicates champion for that year. Italic indicates host for that year.

== Preliminary round ==
=== Group A ===
Pos	Team	Pld	W	D	L	GF	GA	GD	Pts	Qualification
1	Hungary	5	4	1	0	159	115	+44	9	Semifinals
2	Russia	5	4	0	1	118	104	+14	8	Semifinals
3	France	5	3	0	2	127	106	+21	6	Fifth place game
4	Yugoslavia	5	2	1	2	139	138	+1	5	Seventh place game
5	Germany	5	1	0	4	117	134	−17	2	Ninth place game
6	Austria	5	0	0	5	89	152	−63	0	Eleventh place game

Source: EHF
Rules for classification: 1) points; 2) head-to-head points; 3) head-to-head goal difference; 4) head-to-head number of goals scored; 5) goal difference.

8 December 2000; 17:00	**Hungary**	**33–33**	**Yugoslavia**	Traian Sports Hall, Râmnicu Vâlcea; Attendance: 2,500; Referees: Baum, Góralczyk (POL)
8 December 2000; 17:00		(17–18)		Traian Sports Hall, Râmnicu Vâlcea; Attendance: 2,500; Referees: Baum, Góralczyk (POL)
8 December 2000; 17:00		Report		Traian Sports Hall, Râmnicu Vâlcea; Attendance: 2,500; Referees: Baum, Góralczyk (POL)

8 December 2000; 19:00	**Austria**	**20–30**	**Germany**	Traian Sports Hall, Râmnicu Vâlcea; Attendance: 2,500; Referees: Håkansson, Nilsson (SWE)
8 December 2000; 19:00		(7–14)		Traian Sports Hall, Râmnicu Vâlcea; Attendance: 2,500; Referees: Håkansson, Nilsson (SWE)
8 December 2000; 19:00		Report		Traian Sports Hall, Râmnicu Vâlcea; Attendance: 2,500; Referees: Håkansson, Nilsson (SWE)

8 December 2000; 21:00	**France**	**21–22**	**Russia**	Traian Sports Hall, Râmnicu Vâlcea; Attendance: 2,500; Referees: Krajc, Živolić (CRO)
8 December 2000; 21:00	Pecqueux-Rolland 6	(12–15)	Buyanova 5	Traian Sports Hall, Râmnicu Vâlcea; Attendance: 2,500; Referees: Krajc, Živolić (CRO)
8 December 2000; 21:00	4× (yellow card) 6× (suspension)	Report	2× (yellow card) 6× (suspension)	Traian Sports Hall, Râmnicu Vâlcea; Attendance: 2,500; Referees: Krajc, Živolić (CRO)

9 December 2000; 17:00	**Germany**	**22–33**	**Hungary**	Traian Sports Hall, Râmnicu Vâlcea; Attendance: 2,500; Referees: Jaškins, Kazinieks (LAT)
9 December 2000; 17:00		(12–15)		Traian Sports Hall, Râmnicu Vâlcea; Attendance: 2,500; Referees: Jaškins, Kazinieks (LAT)
9 December 2000; 17:00		Report		Traian Sports Hall, Râmnicu Vâlcea; Attendance: 2,500; Referees: Jaškins, Kazinieks (LAT)

9 December 2000; 19:00	**Yugoslavia**	**19–26**	**France**	Traian Sports Hall, Râmnicu Vâlcea; Attendance: 2,500; Referees: Håkansson, Nilsson (SWE)
9 December 2000; 19:00		(10–12)		Traian Sports Hall, Râmnicu Vâlcea; Attendance: 2,500; Referees: Håkansson, Nilsson (SWE)
9 December 2000; 19:00		Report		Traian Sports Hall, Râmnicu Vâlcea; Attendance: 2,500; Referees: Håkansson, Nilsson (SWE)

9 December 2000; 21:00	**Russia**	**28–19**	**Austria**	Traian Sports Hall, Râmnicu Vâlcea; Attendance: 2,500; Referees: Şerbu, Dobre (ROU)
9 December 2000; 21:00	Volkova 6	(15–10)	Ofenböck 9	Traian Sports Hall, Râmnicu Vâlcea; Attendance: 2,500; Referees: Şerbu, Dobre (ROU)
9 December 2000; 21:00	3× (yellow card) 2× (suspension)	Report	3× (yellow card) 3× (suspension)	Traian Sports Hall, Râmnicu Vâlcea; Attendance: 2,500; Referees: Şerbu, Dobre (ROU)

10 December 2000; 17:00	**France**	**25–19**	**Germany**	Traian Sports Hall, Râmnicu Vâlcea; Attendance: 2,500; Referees: Baum, Góralczyk (POL)
10 December 2000; 17:00		(12–12)		Traian Sports Hall, Râmnicu Vâlcea; Attendance: 2,500; Referees: Baum, Góralczyk (POL)
10 December 2000; 17:00		Report		Traian Sports Hall, Râmnicu Vâlcea; Attendance: 2,500; Referees: Baum, Góralczyk (POL)

10 December 2000; 19:00	**Austria**	**12–35**	**Hungary**	Traian Sports Hall, Râmnicu Vâlcea; Attendance: 2,500; Referees: Krajc, Živolić (CRO)
10 December 2000; 19:00		(6–13)		Traian Sports Hall, Râmnicu Vâlcea; Attendance: 2,500; Referees: Krajc, Živolić (CRO)
10 December 2000; 19:00		Report		Traian Sports Hall, Râmnicu Vâlcea; Attendance: 2,500; Referees: Krajc, Živolić (CRO)

10 December 2000; 21:00	**Russia**	**27–20**	**Yugoslavia**	Traian Sports Hall, Râmnicu Vâlcea; Attendance: 2,100; Referees: Jaškins, Kazinieks (LAT)
10 December 2000; 21:00	Bodniyeva, Naukovich 6	(10–12)	Petrović 5	Traian Sports Hall, Râmnicu Vâlcea; Attendance: 2,100; Referees: Jaškins, Kazinieks (LAT)
10 December 2000; 21:00	3× (yellow card) 5× (suspension) 1× (red card)	Report	3× (yellow card) 4× (suspension)	Traian Sports Hall, Râmnicu Vâlcea; Attendance: 2,100; Referees: Jaškins, Kazinieks (LAT)

12 December 2000; 17:00	**Austria**	**24–33**	**Yugoslavia**	Traian Sports Hall, Râmnicu Vâlcea; Attendance: 2,200; Referees: Jaškins, Kazinieks (LAT)
12 December 2000; 17:00		(14–14)		Traian Sports Hall, Râmnicu Vâlcea; Attendance: 2,200; Referees: Jaškins, Kazinieks (LAT)
12 December 2000; 17:00		Report		Traian Sports Hall, Râmnicu Vâlcea; Attendance: 2,200; Referees: Jaškins, Kazinieks (LAT)

12 December 2000; 19:00	**Hungary**	**32–29**	**France**	Traian Sports Hall, Râmnicu Vâlcea; Attendance: 2,500; Referees: Şerbu, Dobre (ROU)
12 December 2000; 19:00		(14–12)		Traian Sports Hall, Râmnicu Vâlcea; Attendance: 2,500; Referees: Şerbu, Dobre (ROU)
12 December 2000; 19:00		Report		Traian Sports Hall, Râmnicu Vâlcea; Attendance: 2,500; Referees: Şerbu, Dobre (ROU)

12 December 2000; 21:00	**Germany**	**18–22**	**Russia**	Traian Sports Hall, Râmnicu Vâlcea; Attendance: 2,500; Referees: Krajc, Živolić (CRO)
12 December 2000; 21:00	Radzevičiūtė 5	(10–11)	Volkova 5	Traian Sports Hall, Râmnicu Vâlcea; Attendance: 2,500; Referees: Krajc, Živolić (CRO)
12 December 2000; 21:00	2× (yellow card) 6× (suspension)	Report	3× (yellow card) 4× (suspension)	Traian Sports Hall, Râmnicu Vâlcea; Attendance: 2,500; Referees: Krajc, Živolić (CRO)

13 December 2000; 17:00	**Hungary**	**26–19**	**Russia**	Traian Sports Hall, Râmnicu Vâlcea; Attendance: 2,100; Referees: Håkansson, Nilsson (SWE)
13 December 2000; 17:00	Pigniczki 5	(17–12)	Volkova 6	Traian Sports Hall, Râmnicu Vâlcea; Attendance: 2,100; Referees: Håkansson, Nilsson (SWE)
13 December 2000; 17:00	2× (yellow card) 3× (suspension)	Report	1× (yellow card) 4× (suspension)	Traian Sports Hall, Râmnicu Vâlcea; Attendance: 2,100; Referees: Håkansson, Nilsson (SWE)

13 December 2000; 19:00	**Yugoslavia**	**34–28**	**Germany**	Traian Sports Hall, Râmnicu Vâlcea; Attendance: 2,100; Referees: Şerbu, Dobre (ROU)
13 December 2000; 19:00		(12–11)		Traian Sports Hall, Râmnicu Vâlcea; Attendance: 2,100; Referees: Şerbu, Dobre (ROU)
13 December 2000; 19:00		Report		Traian Sports Hall, Râmnicu Vâlcea; Attendance: 2,100; Referees: Şerbu, Dobre (ROU)

13 December 2000; 21:00	**France**	**26–14**	**Austria**	Traian Sports Hall, Râmnicu Vâlcea; Attendance: 1,800; Referees: Baum, Góralczyk (POL)
13 December 2000; 21:00		(14–6)		Traian Sports Hall, Râmnicu Vâlcea; Attendance: 1,800; Referees: Baum, Góralczyk (POL)
13 December 2000; 21:00		Report		Traian Sports Hall, Râmnicu Vâlcea; Attendance: 1,800; Referees: Baum, Góralczyk (POL)

=== Group B ===
Pos	Team	Pld	W	D	L	GF	GA	GD	Pts	Qualification
1	Ukraine	5	2	3	0	130	120	+10	7 (Note: Romania 21–23 Ukraine)	Semifinals
2	Romania (H)	5	3	1	1	128	118	+10	7	Semifinals
3	Norway	5	2	2	1	132	126	+6	6	Fifth place game
4	Macedonia	5	1	2	2	113	123	−10	4	Seventh place game
5	Denmark	5	1	1	3	130	137	−7	3 (Note: Denmark 34–26 Belarus)	Ninth place game
6	Belarus	5	0	3	2	134	143	−9	3	Eleventh place game

Source: EHF
Rules for classification: 1) points; 2) head-to-head points; 3) head-to-head goal difference; 4) head-to-head number of goals scored; 5) goal difference.
(H) Hosts
Notes:

8 December 2000; 17:00	**Romania**	**29–28**	**Belarus**	Polyvalent Hall, Bucharest; Attendance: 1,600; Referees: Marić, Gardinovački (FRY)
8 December 2000; 17:00		(15–15)		Polyvalent Hall, Bucharest; Attendance: 1,600; Referees: Marić, Gardinovački (FRY)
8 December 2000; 17:00		Report		Polyvalent Hall, Bucharest; Attendance: 1,600; Referees: Marić, Gardinovački (FRY)

8 December 2000; 19:00	**Norway**	**24–24**	**Ukraine**	Polyvalent Hall, Bucharest; Attendance: 1,400; Referees: Repenšek, Požežnik (SLO)
8 December 2000; 19:00		(11–9)		Polyvalent Hall, Bucharest; Attendance: 1,400; Referees: Repenšek, Požežnik (SLO)
8 December 2000; 19:00		Report		Polyvalent Hall, Bucharest; Attendance: 1,400; Referees: Repenšek, Požežnik (SLO)

8 December 2000; 21:00	**Denmark**	**19–20**	**Macedonia**	Polyvalent Hall, Bucharest; Attendance: 800; Referees: Goulão, Macau (POR)
8 December 2000; 21:00		(9–5)		Polyvalent Hall, Bucharest; Attendance: 800; Referees: Goulão, Macau (POR)
8 December 2000; 21:00		Report		Polyvalent Hall, Bucharest; Attendance: 800; Referees: Goulão, Macau (POR)

9 December 2000; 17:00	**Ukraine**	**29–29**	**Denmark**	Polyvalent Hall, Bucharest; Attendance: 2,800; Referees: Methe, Methe (GER)
9 December 2000; 17:00		(15–13)		Polyvalent Hall, Bucharest; Attendance: 2,800; Referees: Methe, Methe (GER)

9 December 2000; 19:00	**Macedonia**	**19–19**	**Romania**	Polyvalent Hall, Bucharest; Attendance: 4,500; Referees: Bord, Buy (FRA)
9 December 2000; 19:00		(9–11)		Polyvalent Hall, Bucharest; Attendance: 4,500; Referees: Bord, Buy (FRA)
9 December 2000; 19:00		Report		Polyvalent Hall, Bucharest; Attendance: 4,500; Referees: Bord, Buy (FRA)

9 December 2000; 21:00	**Belarus**	**26–26**	**Norway**	Polyvalent Hall, Bucharest; Attendance: 800; Referees: Goulão, Macau (POR)
9 December 2000; 21:00		(13–12)		Polyvalent Hall, Bucharest; Attendance: 800; Referees: Goulão, Macau (POR)
9 December 2000; 21:00		Report		Polyvalent Hall, Bucharest; Attendance: 800; Referees: Goulão, Macau (POR)

10 December 2000; 17:00	**Macedonia**	**19–27**	**Ukraine**	Polyvalent Hall, Bucharest; Attendance: 2,000; Referees: Marić, Gardinovački (FRY)
10 December 2000; 17:00		(8–10)		Polyvalent Hall, Bucharest; Attendance: 2,000; Referees: Marić, Gardinovački (FRY)
10 December 2000; 17:00		Report		Polyvalent Hall, Bucharest; Attendance: 2,000; Referees: Marić, Gardinovački (FRY)

10 December 2000; 19:00	**Romania**	**26–22**	**Norway**	Polyvalent Hall, Bucharest; Attendance: 3,500; Referees: Methe, Methe (GER)
10 December 2000; 19:00		(14–12)		Polyvalent Hall, Bucharest; Attendance: 3,500; Referees: Methe, Methe (GER)
10 December 2000; 19:00		Report		Polyvalent Hall, Bucharest; Attendance: 3,500; Referees: Methe, Methe (GER)

10 December 2000; 21:00	**Denmark**	**34–26**	**Belarus**	Polyvalent Hall, Bucharest; Attendance: 1,200; Referees: Bord, Buy (FRA)
10 December 2000; 21:00		(20–17)		Polyvalent Hall, Bucharest; Attendance: 1,200; Referees: Bord, Buy (FRA)
10 December 2000; 21:00		Report		Polyvalent Hall, Bucharest; Attendance: 1,200; Referees: Bord, Buy (FRA)

12 December 2000; 17:00	**Belarus**	**27–27**	**Macedonia**	Polyvalent Hall, Bucharest; Attendance: 2,000; Referees: Repenšek, Požežnik (SLO)
12 December 2000; 17:00		(11–12)		Polyvalent Hall, Bucharest; Attendance: 2,000; Referees: Repenšek, Požežnik (SLO)
12 December 2000; 17:00		Report		Polyvalent Hall, Bucharest; Attendance: 2,000; Referees: Repenšek, Požežnik (SLO)

12 December 2000; 19:00	**Romania**	**21–23**	**Ukraine**	Polyvalent Hall, Bucharest; Attendance: 4,200; Referees: Goulão, Macau (POR)
12 December 2000; 19:00		(12–10)		Polyvalent Hall, Bucharest; Attendance: 4,200; Referees: Goulão, Macau (POR)
12 December 2000; 19:00		Report		Polyvalent Hall, Bucharest; Attendance: 4,200; Referees: Goulão, Macau (POR)

12 December 2000; 21:00	**Norway**	**29–22**	**Denmark**	Polyvalent Hall, Bucharest; Attendance: 1,800; Referees: Marić, Gardinovački (FRY)
12 December 2000; 21:00		(16–12)		Polyvalent Hall, Bucharest; Attendance: 1,800; Referees: Marić, Gardinovački (FRY)
12 December 2000; 21:00		Report		Polyvalent Hall, Bucharest; Attendance: 1,800; Referees: Marić, Gardinovački (FRY)

13 December 2000; 17:00	**Ukraine**	**27–27**	**Belarus**	Polyvalent Hall, Bucharest; Attendance: 1,800; Referees: Bord, Buy (FRA)
13 December 2000; 17:00		(11–13)		Polyvalent Hall, Bucharest; Attendance: 1,800; Referees: Bord, Buy (FRA)
13 December 2000; 17:00		Report		Polyvalent Hall, Bucharest; Attendance: 1,800; Referees: Bord, Buy (FRA)

13 December 2000; 19:00	**Denmark**	**26–33**	**Romania**	Polyvalent Hall, Bucharest; Attendance: 4,500; Referees: Repenšek, Požežnik (SLO)
13 December 2000; 19:00		(13–18)		Polyvalent Hall, Bucharest; Attendance: 4,500; Referees: Repenšek, Požežnik (SLO)
13 December 2000; 19:00		Report		Polyvalent Hall, Bucharest; Attendance: 4,500; Referees: Repenšek, Požežnik (SLO)

13 December 2000; 21:00	**Norway**	**31–28**	**Macedonia**	Polyvalent Hall, Bucharest; Attendance: 750; Referees: Methe, Methe (GER)
13 December 2000; 21:00		(14–11)		Polyvalent Hall, Bucharest; Attendance: 750; Referees: Methe, Methe (GER)
13 December 2000; 21:00		Report		Polyvalent Hall, Bucharest; Attendance: 750; Referees: Methe, Methe (GER)

== Final round ==
=== Bracket ===
Semifinals
16 December
**Hungary**	**25**
Romania	24
16 December
**Ukraine**	**28**
Russia	24

Final
17 December
**Hungary (ET)**	**32**
Ukraine	30
Third place
17 December
**Russia**	**21**
Romania	16

=== Eleventh place game ===
15 December 2000; 18:30	**Austria**	**22–27**	**Belarus**	Traian Sports Hall, Râmnicu Vâlcea; Attendance: 2,500; Referees: Baum, Góralczyk (POL)
15 December 2000; 18:30	Ofenböck 10	(11–16)	Kulik 6	Traian Sports Hall, Râmnicu Vâlcea; Attendance: 2,500; Referees: Baum, Góralczyk (POL)
15 December 2000; 18:30	4× (yellow card) 2× (suspension)	Report	3× (yellow card) 3× (suspension)	Traian Sports Hall, Râmnicu Vâlcea; Attendance: 2,500; Referees: Baum, Góralczyk (POL)

=== Ninth place game ===
15 December 2000; 18:30	**Germany**	**22–21**	**Denmark**	Polyvalent Hall, Bucharest; Attendance: 500; Referees: Marić, Gardinovački (FRY)
15 December 2000; 18:30	Blacha, Schmidt 5	(10–13)	Skov, Vestergaard 5	Polyvalent Hall, Bucharest; Attendance: 500; Referees: Marić, Gardinovački (FRY)
15 December 2000; 18:30	3× (yellow card) 3× (suspension)	Report	3× (yellow card) 1× (suspension)	Polyvalent Hall, Bucharest; Attendance: 500; Referees: Marić, Gardinovački (FRY)

=== Seventh place game ===
15 December 2000
21:00
Yugoslavia
**39–38** **(ET)**
Macedonia
Polyvalent Hall, Bucharest
Attendance: 500
Referees: Bord, Buy (FRA)
Medved 10
(14–16)
Boeva 10
3× (yellow card) 4× (suspension) 1× (red card)
Report
3× (yellow card) 6× (suspension) 1× (red card)

FT: 29–29 ET: 3–3, 7–6

=== Fifth place game ===
15 December 2000; 21:00	**France**	**23–19**	**Norway**	Traian Sports Hall, Râmnicu Vâlcea; Attendance: 2,500; Referees: Goulão, Macau (POR)
15 December 2000; 21:00	Pecqueux-Rolland 5	(11–11)	Breivang 6	Traian Sports Hall, Râmnicu Vâlcea; Attendance: 2,500; Referees: Goulão, Macau (POR)
15 December 2000; 21:00	3× (yellow card) 6× (suspension)	Report	2× (yellow card) 2× (suspension)	Traian Sports Hall, Râmnicu Vâlcea; Attendance: 2,500; Referees: Goulão, Macau (POR)

=== Semifinals ===
16 December 2000; 17:30	**Ukraine**	**28–24**	**Russia**	Polyvalent Hall, Bucharest; Attendance: 5,000; Referees: Repenšek, Požežnik (SLO)
16 December 2000; 17:30	Tsyhytsia 16	(12–12)	Volkova 8	Polyvalent Hall, Bucharest; Attendance: 5,000; Referees: Repenšek, Požežnik (SLO)
16 December 2000; 17:30	3× (yellow card) 6× (suspension) 1× (red card)	Report	3× (yellow card) 6× (suspension) 1× (red card)	Polyvalent Hall, Bucharest; Attendance: 5,000; Referees: Repenšek, Požežnik (SLO)

16 December 2000; 20:00	**Hungary**	**25–24**	**Romania**	Polyvalent Hall, Bucharest; Attendance: 5,500; Referees: Krajc, Živolić (CRO)
16 December 2000; 20:00	Farkas 9	(13–12)	Gogîrlă 14	Polyvalent Hall, Bucharest; Attendance: 5,500; Referees: Krajc, Živolić (CRO)
16 December 2000; 20:00	3× (yellow card) 4× (suspension)	Report	3× (yellow card) 5× (suspension) 1× (red card)	Polyvalent Hall, Bucharest; Attendance: 5,500; Referees: Krajc, Živolić (CRO)

=== Third place game ===
17 December 2000; 17:30	**Russia**	**21–16**	**Romania**	Polyvalent Hall, Bucharest; Attendance: 4,000; Referees: Håkansson, Nilsson (SWE)
17 December 2000; 17:30	Naukovich 5	(10–7)	Gogîrlă 9	Polyvalent Hall, Bucharest; Attendance: 4,000; Referees: Håkansson, Nilsson (SWE)
17 December 2000; 17:30	2× (yellow card) 7× (suspension) 2× (red card)	Report	2× (yellow card) 4× (suspension)	Polyvalent Hall, Bucharest; Attendance: 4,000; Referees: Håkansson, Nilsson (SWE)

=== Final ===
17 December 2000
20:00
Hungary
**32–30** **(ET)**
Ukraine
Polyvalent Hall, Bucharest
Attendance: 4,000
Referees: Şerbu, Dobre (ROU)
Farkas 14
(17–13)
Yaresko 7
2× (yellow card) 2× (suspension)
Report
3× (yellow card)

FT: 26–26 ET: 6–4

== Final ranking and statistics ==
1st place, gold medalist(s)	Hungary
2nd place, silver medalist(s)	Ukraine
3rd place, bronze medalist(s)	Russia
4	Romania
5	France
6	Norway
7	Yugoslavia
8	Macedonia
9	Germany
10	Denmark
11	Belarus
12	Austria

2000 Women's European champions

**Hungary**
**1st title**

Nikolett Brigovácz, Ágnes Farkas, Anikó Kántor, Gabriella Kindl, Erika Kirsner, Anita Kulcsár, Beatrix Kökény, Krisztina Nagy, Ildikó Pádár, Zsuzsanna Pálffy, Katalin Pálinger, Krisztina Pigniczki, Judit Simics, Beáta Siti, Eszter Siti, Tímea Sugár Head coach: Lajos Mocsai.

=== Top goalscorers ===
Rank	Name	Team	Goals	Shots	%
1	Simona Gogîrlă	Romania	68	108	62.96
2	Ágnes Farkas	Hungary	54	105	51.43
3	Steffi Ofenböck	Austria	49	119	41.18
3	Olena Tsyhytsia	Ukraine	49	93	52.69
5	Klara Boeva	Macedonia	42	78	53.85
6	Steluța Luca	Romania	41	94	43.62
7	Svetlana Minevskaya	Belarus	37	76	48.68
8	Mette Vestergaard	Denmark	35	74	47.30
9	Bojana Petrović	Yugoslavia	33	70	47.14
10	Lotte Kiærskou	Denmark	32	60	53.33
10	Inna Volkova	Russia	32	57	56.14

Source: EHF

=== Top goalkeepers ===
Rank	Name	Team	%	Saves	Shots
1	Tatiana Alizar	Russia	41.95	73	174
2	Valérie Nicolas	France	40.46	70	173
3	Tetyana Vorozhtsova	Ukraine	36.96	68	184
4	Luminița Huțupan	Romania	35.85	76	212
5	Nataliya Rusnachenko	Austria	34.26	74	216
6	Katalin Pálinger	Hungary	33.82	69	204
7	Hege Johansen	Norway	32.43	36	111
8	Oksana Maslova	Macedonia	31.78	34	107
9	Branka Jovanović	Yugoslavia	31.68	32	101
10	Eike Bram	Germany	30.89	59	191

Source: EHF

=== All Star Team ===
Position	Player
Goalkeeper	Luminița Huțupan (ROU)
Right wing	Agnieszka Tobiasz (GER)
Right back	Melinda Szabó (FRA)
Centre back	Beáta Siti (HUN)
Left back	Olena Tsyhytsia (UKR)
Left wing	Larisa Ferzalieva (MKD)
Pivot	Lyudmila Bodniyeva (RUS)
Most valuable player	Beáta Siti (HUN)

Source: Hand mag
