= HC Teramo 2002 =

Italian handball club

- Full name: Handball Club Teramo 2002
- Short name: HC Teramo
- Founded: 2002
- Arena: PalaSanicolò, Teramo
- Capacity: 1,500
- Head coach: Serafino La Bricciosa
- League: Serie A1
- 2011–12: 1st
- Club colours
Home	Away

Handball Club Teramo 2002, a.k.a. D'Archivio Arche-Artro Teramo for sponsorship reasons, is an Italian women's handball club from Teramo established in 2002. In 2005 it made its debut in EHF competitions, and in 2012 it won the Italian league for the first time.

== Titles ==
- Serie A1
  - 2012

== Notable former players ==
- (Denmark) Karina Jespersen
