= Hege Anett Pettersson =

Norwegian handball player (born 1973)

Personal information
- Nationality: Norwegian
- Born: 30 June 1973 (age 53)

Sport
- Sport: Handball
- Position: Goalkeeper

Senior clubs
- Years: Team
- –: Tertnes HE
National team
Years	Team	Apps	(Gls)
2000–2000	Norway	8	(0)

Hege Anett Pettersson (née Hege Anett Johansen; born 30 June 1973) is a Norwegian handball player who played for the club Tertnes HE. She played eight matches for the national handball team in 2000, including participation at the 2000 European Women's Handball Championship.
