= Stefanie Melbeck =

German handball player (born 1977)

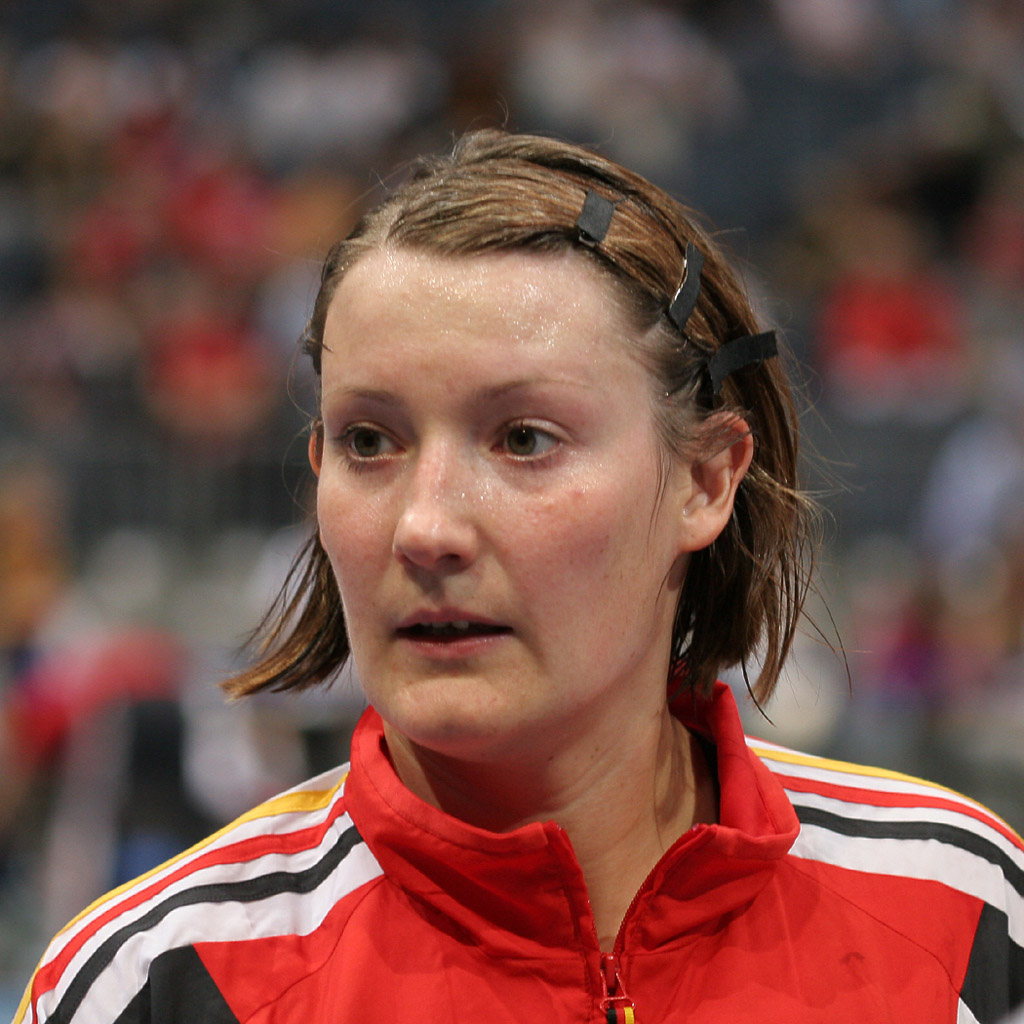
- Melbeck in July 2008 in a match against Angola

Personal information
- Nationality: German
- Born: 16 April 1977 (age 49) Hamburg, Germany
- Height: 1.74 m (5 ft 9 in)

Sport
- Sport: Handball
- Position: Right back
- Current club: Retired

Youth career
- Years: Team
- 1986-1992: TuS Nenndorf
- 1992-1996: VfL Horneburg

Senior clubs
- Years: Team
- 1996-1999: Buxtehuder SV
- 1999-2001: Randers HK
- 2001-2007: Buxtehuder SV
- 2007-2010: KIF Kolding
- 2010-2012: Buxtehuder SV
National team
Years	Team	Apps	(Gls)
1998-?	Germany	223	(483)
Medal record
Representing Germany
Women's handball
World Championship
Bronze medal – third place	2007 France	Team
- Updated on 5 February 2024

Stefanie Melbeck (born 16 April 1977 in Hamburg) is a retired German handball player. She last played for the club Buxtehuder SV, and has earlier played for the Danish clubs Randers HK and KIF Kolding.

She won a bronze medal with the German national team at the 2007 World Women's Handball Championship.

She participated at the 2008 Summer Olympics in China, where the German team placed 11th.
