= Macarena Gandulfo =

Argentine handball player

Personal information
- Born: 3 November 1993 (age 32) Buenos Aires, Argentina
- Height: 1.75 m (5 ft 9 in)

Sport
- Sport: Handball
- Position: Left back
- Current club: Ariosto Pallamano Ferrara
- Number: 21

Senior clubs
- Years: Team
- 2012–2013: Sedalo
- 2013–2014: Cascavel
- 2014–2014: Itapevi
- 2014–2015: Santa Feevale
- 2015–2017: BM Alcobendas
- 2017–2019: CBF Málaga Costa del Sol
- 2019–2020: Universitatea Cluj-Napoca
- 2020–2022: Ardèche Le Pouzin HB07 Handball
- 2022–2024: CSM Corona Brasov
- 2024–: Ariosto Pallamano Ferrara
National team
Years	Team	Apps	(Gls)
–	Argentina	77	(88)
Medal record
Pan American Games
Silver medal – second place	2015 Toronto	Team
Silver medal – second place	2019 Lima	Team
Silver medal – second place	2023 Santiago	Team
Pan American Championship
Silver medal – second place	2017 Argentina
Bronze medal – third place	2015 Cuba
South and Central American Championship
Silver medal – second place	2018 Brazil
Silver medal – second place	2021 Paraguay
Silver medal – second place	2022 Argentina
South American Games
Silver medal – second place	2018 Cochabamba	Team

Macarena Gandulfo (born 3 November 1993) is an Argentine handball player for Ariosto Pallamano Ferrara and the Argentina women's national handball team.
