= Nina Müller =

German handball player (born 1980)

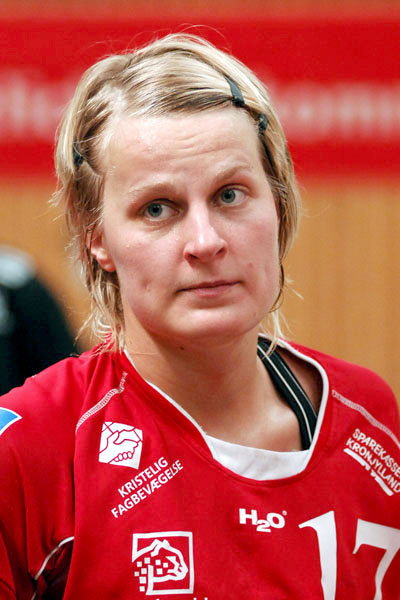

Personal information
- Full name: Nina Christin Müller
- Nationality: German
- Born: 14 November 1980 (age 45) Bremen, West Germany
- Height: 1.80 m (5 ft 11 in)

Sport
- Sport: Handball
- Position: Central back
- Current club: Füchse Berlin
- Number: 17

Senior clubs
- Years: Team
- 1997–2000: VfL Oldenburg
- 2000–2006: HC Leipzig
- 2006–2012: Randers HK
- 2012–2014: RK Krim
- 2014–2015: Siófok KC
- 2015–2018: SG BBM Bietigheim
- 2018: Randers HK
- 2018-2019: Thüringer HC
- 2019-?: Füchse Berlin
National team
Years	Team	Apps	(Gls)
1999–?	Germany	197	(411)
Medal record
World Championship
Bronze medal – third place	2007 France	Team
- Updated on 7 March 2021

Nina Christin Müller, née Wörz (born 14 November 1980 in Bremen) is a German handball player. She plays for the German club Füchse Berlin and for the German national team, having made her international debut on 19 February 1999 against Poland.

Wörz was member of the German national team that won the World Championship bronze medal in 2007 and also participated at the 2008 Summer Olympic Games in Beijing, where Germany placed eleventh. She was also present at the 2008 European Women's Handball Championship and the 2009 World Women's Handball Championship in China. In 2010, she took part on the European Championship, where Germany achieved the thirteenth position. She married her former national teammate, Susann Müller, in 2016.

== Achievements ==
- Bundesliga:
  - Winner: 2002, 2006
- German Cup:
  - Winner: 2006
- EHF Cup:
  - Winner: 2010
- World Championship:
  - Bronze Medalist: 2007
