= Silke Gnad =

German handball player (born 1966)

Personal information
- Nationality: German
- Born: 20 November 1966 (age 59) Stralsund, East Germany

Sport
- Sport: Handball
- Position: Left wing

Youth career
- Years: Team
- 1974-1980: ASV Vorwärts Stralsund
- 1980-1984: ASK Vorwärts Frankfurt

Senior clubs
- Years: Team
- 1984-1990: ASK Vorwärts Frankfurt
- 1990-1996: TuS Walle Bremen
- 1996-1998: Borussia Dortmund Handball
- 1998-2000: Vigasio Verona
- 2000-2002: Teutonia Riemke
- –: HG Remscheid
- –: HSV Solingen-Gräfrath
National team
Years	Team	Apps	(Gls)
1986-?	East Germany/Germany	140	(390)

Silke Gnad, also known as Silke Fittinger (née Silke Thiel 20 November 1966 in Stralsund, Germany), is a German former handball player. She participated at the 1992 Summer Olympics, where the German national team placed fourteenth.

She has won both the DDR championship with ASK Vorwärts Frankfurt and the unified German Championship with TuS Walle Bremen.
