= Olena Tsyhytsia =

Ukrainian handball player

Personal information
- Full name: Olena Leonidivna Tsyhytsia
- Nationality: Ukrainian
- Born: April 8, 1975 (age 51) Kryvyi Rih, Ukrainian SSR, Soviet Union
- Height: 1.80 m (5 ft 11 in)
- Weight: 70 kg (154 lb)

Sport
- Sport: Handball
- Position: Left back
- Current club: Retired

Senior clubs
- Years: Team
- 1998–2001: Spartak Kyiv
- 2001–2003: Motor Zaporozhye
- 2003–2005: Kometal Gjorče Petrov Skopje
- 2005–2011: HC Motor Zaporozhye / HC Smart / HC Sparta
National team
- Years: Team
- 2000–2004: Ukraine
Medal record
Representing Ukraine
Women's handball
Olympic Games
Bronze medal – third place	2004 Athens	Team
European Championship
Silver medal – second place	2000 Romania	Team

Olena Tsyhytsia (born 8 April 1975) is a Ukrainian team handball player. She received a bronze medal with the Ukrainian national team at the 2004 Summer Olympics in Athens.
