= Annette Tveter =

Norwegian handball player (born 1974)

Anette Tveter
Personal information
- Nationality: Norwegian
- Born: September 14, 1974 (age 52)

Sport
- Sport: Handball
- Position: Back

Senior clubs
- Years: Team
- 1994–2002: Larvik HK
National team
Years	Team	Apps	(Gls)
1997	Norway	11	(8)
Medal record
Women's handball
World Championship
Silver medal – second place	1997 Germany	Team

Annette Tveter (born 1974) is a Norwegian handball player. She played eleven matches for the national handball team in 1997, and participated at the 1997 World Women's Handball Championship in Germany, where the Norwegian team placed second.

She played for Larvik HK from 1994-95 to 2001-02.

== Private ==
Her daughters Kine Tveter and Martine Tveter are also handball players.
