= Lise Kristiansen =

Norwegian handball player

Personal information
- Full name: Lise Kristiansen Solem
- Nationality: Norwegian
- Born: September 26, 1975 (age 51)

Sport
- Sport: Handball
- Position: Goalkeeper

Senior clubs
- Years: Team
- 1992–1995: Byåsen IL
- 1995–1999: Larvik HK
- 1999–2000: Nordstrand IF
- 2000–2001: Stabæk Håndball
- 2003–2004: Byåsen IL
National team
Years	Team	Apps	(Gls)
1997	Norway	1	(0)
Medal record
Representing Norway
Women's handball
World championship
Silver medal – second place	1997 Germany	Team

Lise Kristiansen (born 26 June 1975) is a Norwegian handball player. She played on the Norway women's national handball team at the 1997 World Women's Handball Championship, where Norway placed second.
