= Indeco Conversano =

Italian handball club

- Founded: 1973; 53 years ago
- Arena: Palasangiacomo, Conversano
- Capacity: 4,000
- President: Vincenza Fanelli
- League: Serie A1
- 2015–16: 1st
- Club colours
Home	Away

Indeco Conversano is an Italian handball team.

The club was founded in 1973. Until 2018 it was called Amatori Handball Conversano.

== Honours ==
- Serie A
  - Winners (2) : 2015, 2016
- Italian Cup
  - Winners (4) : 2014-15, 2015-16, 2016-17, 2017-18
- Supercoppa Italiana
  - Winners (3) : 2014, 2015, 2016

== European record ==
Season	Competition	Round	Club	1st leg	2nd leg	Aggregate
2016–17	EHF Champions League	Q1	(Poland) MKS Selgros Lublin	28–27		2nd place
2016–17	EHF Champions League	Q1	(Slovenia) RK Krim	16–37		2nd place
2016–17	EHF Cup	R3	(Denmark) Nykøbing Falster HK	24–36	22–36	46–72
