= Andrea Stolletz =

German handball player (born 1963)

Andrea Stolletz (née Andrea Wolf born 30 October 1963 in Plauen, East Germany) is a German handball goalkeeper. She participated at the 1992 Summer Olympics, where the German national team placed fourth.
