= Germany women's national handball team =

Women's national handball team representing Germany

Germany

Information
- Association: German Handball Association
- Coach: Markus Gaugisch
- Assistant coach: Frederick Griesbach
- Captain: Emily Bölk
- Most caps: Grit Jurack (306)
- Most goals: Grit Jurack (1581)

Colours
| 1st | 2nd |

Results

Summer Olympics
- Appearances: 5 (First in 1984)
- Best result: 4th (1984, 1992)

World Championship
- Appearances: 25 (First in 1957)
- Best result: 1st (1993)

European Championship
- Appearances: 15 (First in 1994)
- Best result: 2nd (1994)
- Last updated on Unknown.

Germany women's national handball team
Medal record

World Championship
| Gold medal – first place | 1993 Norway | |
| Silver medal – second place | 2025 Netherlands/Germany | |
| Bronze medal – third place | 1965 West Germany | |
| Bronze medal – third place | 1997 Germany | |
| Bronze medal – third place | 2007 France | |

European Championship
| Silver medal – second place | 1994 Germany | |

The Germany women's national handball team is the national handball team of Germany. It is governed by the Deutscher Handball-Bund and takes part in international handball competitions.

== History ==
During the years of Germany's division, the East German women's national handball team represented the German Democratic Republic in international matches and tournaments. East Germany was one of the strongest national teams in the world, winning the World Women's Handball Championship three times, in 1971, 1975 and 1978.

As a united Germany, the team had early success already at their first tournament with a 4th placed finish at the 1992 Olympics, followed by their greatest successes; winning the 1993 World Championship and finishing second at the 1994 European Women's Handball Championship. They also finished third at the World Championship in 1965, 1997 and 2007. During the 2010s the team could not replicate the early success, with exiting in the main round of European and World Championships being the norm.

At the 2025 World Women's Handball Championship reached the final, where they lost to Norway. This was the first time since 1994 that Germany made the final of a major international tournament and the first time they won a medal since 2007.

== Results ==
For East Germany team record, look here.

| Competition | 1st place, gold medalist(s) | 2nd place, silver medalist(s) | 3rd place, bronze medalist(s) | Total |
|---|---|---|---|---|
| Olympic Games | 0 | 0 | 0 | 0 |
| World Championship | 1 | 1 | 3 | 5 |
| European Championship | 0 | 1 | 0 | 1 |
| Total | 1 | 1 | 3 | 5 |

=== Olympic Games ===
| Year | Round | Position | GP | W | D* | L | GS | GA |
|---|---|---|---|---|---|---|---|---|
| (Canada) 1976 | did not qualify | | | | | | | |
| (Soviet Union) 1980 | did not qualify | | | | | | | |
| (United States) 1984 | Main round | 4 | 5 | 2 | 0 | 3 | 91 | 100 |
| (South Korea) 1988 | did not qualify | | | | | | | |
| (Spain) 1992 | Semifinals | 4 | 5 | 2 | 0 | 3 | 131 | 111 |
| (United States) 1996 | Preliminary round | 6 | 3 | 1 | 0 | 2 | 70 | 73 |
| (Australia) 2000 | did not qualify | | | | | | | |
| (Greece) 2004 | did not qualify | | | | | | | |
| (China) 2008 | Preliminary round | 11 | 5 | 1 | 0 | 4 | 123 | 134 |
| (United Kingdom) 2012 | did not qualify | | | | | | | |
| (Brazil) 2016 | did not qualify | | | | | | | |
| (Japan) 2020 | did not qualify | | | | | | | |
| (France) 2024 | Quarterfinals | 8 | 6 | 1 | 0 | 5 | 159 | 160 |
| (United States) 2028 | Future event | | | | | | | |
| Total | 5/14 | | 24 | 7 | 0 | 17 | 574 | 578 |

=== World Championship ===
| Year | Round | Position | GP | W | D* | L | GS | GA |
|---|---|---|---|---|---|---|---|---|
| (Socialist Federal Republic of Yugoslavia) 1957 | Third place game | 4 | 5 | 2 | 0 | 3 | 33 | 38 |
| (Romania) 1962 | Preliminary round | 8 | 2 | 0 | 1 | 1 | 15 | 18 |
| (West Germany) 1965 | Third place game | 3 | 4 | 3 | 0 | 1 | 37 | 30 |
| (Netherlands) 1971 | Fifth place game | 5 | 5 | 2 | 0 | 3 | 52 | 51 |
| (Socialist Federal Republic of Yugoslavia) 1973 | Placement round | 11 | 5 | 1 | 0 | 4 | 49 | 66 |
| (Soviet Union) 1975 | did not qualify | | | | | | | |
| (Czechoslovakia) 1978 | Placement round | 8 | 5 | 2 | 0 | 3 | 78 | 77 |
| (Hungary) 1982 | Placement round | 9 | 7 | 3 | 1 | 3 | 143 | 114 |
| (Netherlands) 1986 | Seventh place game | 7 | 7 | 4 | 0 | 3 | 132 | 128 |
| (South Korea) 1990 | Third place game | 4 | 7 | 4 | 0 | 3 | 141 | 131 |
| (Norway) 1993 | Final | 1 | 7 | 6 | 0 | 1 | 161 | 111 |
| (Austria) / (Hungary) 1995 | Fifth place game | 5 | 8 | 5 | 1 | 2 | 186 | 166 |
| (Germany) 1997 | Third place game | 3 | 9 | 8 | 0 | 1 | 260 | 184 |
| (Denmark) / (Norway) 1999 | Seventh place game | 7 | 9 | 5 | 1 | 3 | 234 | 198 |
| (Italy) 2001 | did not qualify | | | | | | | |
| (Croatia) 2003 | Main round | 12 | 8 | 3 | 1 | 4 | 220 | 198 |
| (Russia) 2005 | Fifth place game | 6 | 9 | 6 | 0 | 3 | 278 | 240 |
| (France) 2007 | Third place game | 3 | 9 | 7 | 1 | 1 | 324 | 279 |
| (China) 2009 | Seventh place game | 7 | 9 | 6 | 0 | 3 | 253 | 242 |
| (Brazil) 2011 | 17th place game | 17 | 7 | 4 | 0 | 3 | 190 | 165 |
| (Serbia) 2013 | Quarterfinals | 7 | 7 | 6 | 0 | 1 | 209 | 168 |
| (Denmark) 2015 | Round of 16 | 13 | 6 | 3 | 0 | 3 | 173 | 142 |
| (Germany) 2017 | Round of 16 | 12 | 6 | 3 | 1 | 2 | 137 | 116 |
| (Japan) 2019 | Seventh place game | 8 | 9 | 4 | 1 | 4 | 248 | 230 |
| (Spain) 2021 | Quarterfinals | 7 | 7 | 5 | 0 | 2 | 195 | 171 |
| (Denmark) / (Norway) / (Sweden) 2023 | Quarterfinals | 6 | 9 | 6 | 0 | 3 | 270 | 225 |
| (Germany) / (Netherlands) 2025 | Final | 2 | 9 | 8 | 0 | 1 | 281 | 245 |
| (Hungary) 2027 | TBD | | | | | | | |
| (Spain) 2029 | TBD | | | | | | | |
| (Czech Republic) / (Poland) 2031 | TBD | | | | | | | |
| Total | 25/30 | 1 Title | 165 | 98 | 8 | 60 | 4018 | 3488 |

=== European Championship ===
| Year | Round | Position | Pld | W | D | L | GS | GA | +/- |
|---|---|---|---|---|---|---|---|---|---|
| (Germany) 1994 | Final | 2 | 7 | 5 | 0 | 2 | 152 | 143 | +9 |
| (Denmark) 1996 | Third place game | 4 | 7 | 4 | 0 | 3 | 169 | 165 | +4 |
| (Netherlands) 1998 | Preliminary round | 6 | 6 | 4 | 0 | 2 | 140 | 145 | −5 |
| (Romania) 2000 | Preliminary round | 9 | 6 | 2 | 0 | 4 | 139 | 155 | −16 |
| (Denmark) 2002 | Main round | 11 | 6 | 1 | 0 | 5 | 142 | 168 | −26 |
| (Hungary) 2004 | Fifth place game | 5 | 7 | 5 | 0 | 2 | 183 | 173 | +10 |
| (Sweden) 2006 | Third place game | 4 | 8 | 5 | 0 | 3 | 228 | 208 | +20 |
| (North Macedonia) 2008 | Third place game | 4 | 8 | 5 | 1 | 2 | 227 | 208 | +19 |
| (Denmark) / (Norway) 2010 | Preliminary round | 13 | 3 | 1 | 0 | 2 | 78 | 87 | −9 |
| (Serbia) 2012 | Main round | 7 | 6 | 3 | 1 | 2 | 136 | 132 | +4 |
| (Croatia) / (Hungary) 2014 | Main round | 10 | 6 | 2 | 1 | 3 | 164 | 165 | −1 |
| (Sweden) 2016 | Fifth place game | 6 | 7 | 4 | 1 | 2 | 169 | 155 | +14 |
| (France) 2018 | Main round | 10 | 6 | 3 | 0 | 3 | 162 | 165 | −3 |
| (Denmark) / (Norway) 2020 | Main round | 7 | 6 | 2 | 1 | 3 | 145 | 158 | −13 |
| (Slovenia) (North Macedonia) (Montenegro) 2022 | Main round | 7 | 6 | 3 | 0 | 3 | 160 | 160 | 0 |
| (Austria) (Hungary) (Switzerland) 2024 | Main round | 7 | 8 | 4 | 0 | 3 | 202 | 170 | +32 |
| (Czech Republic) (Poland) (Romania) (Slovakia) (Turkey) 2026 | Qualified | | | | | | | | |
| (Denmark) (Norway) (Sweden) 2028 | TBD | | | | | | | | |
| (Belgium) (France) 2030 | TBD | | | | | | | | |
| (Denmark) (Germany) (Poland) 2032 | Qualified as co-host | | | | | | | | |
| Total | 18/20 | | 95 | 49 | 5 | 41 | 2394 | 2387 | +7 |

** Red border colour indicates that tournament was held on home soil.

=== Performance in other tournaments ===
- Møbelringen Cup 2011 – Second place
- Carpathian Trophy 1997 – Third place
- Carpathian Trophy 2008 – Third place
- Carpathian Trophy 2013 – Second place
- Carpathian Trophy 2015 – Third place

== Team ==
=== Current squad ===
The squad chosen for the 2026 European Women's Handball Championship.

Head coach: Markus Gaugisch

Caps and goals as of 14 October 2026.

| No. | Pos. | Name | Date of birth (age) | Height | App. | Goals | Club |
|---|---|---|---|---|---|---|---|
| 4 | CB | Alina Grijseels | 12 April 1996 (age 30) | 1.75 m | 128 | 425 | (Germany) Borussia Dortmund |
| 5 | RW | Farrelle Njinkeu | 9 January 2007 (age 19) | 1.74 m | 2 | 3 | (Germany) HSG Blomberg-Lippe |
| 8 | RB | Nina Engel | 25 April 2003 (age 23) | 1.76 m | 34 | 111 | (Romania) CS Gloria Bistrița |
| 9 | P | Lisa Antl | 21 June 2000 (age 26) | 1.72 m | 89 | 146 | (Germany) Borussia Dortmund |
| 10 | CB | Mareike Thomaier | 25 August 2000 (age 26) | 1.72 m | 55 | 61 | (Germany) Borussia Dortmund |
| 14 | P | Marie Steffen | 2 March 2001 (age 25) | 1.83 m | 21 | 16 | (Germany) CS Rapid București |
| 18 | P | Ida Petzold | 8 December 2005 (age 20) | 1.80 m | 1 | 2 | (Germany) TuS Metzingen |
| 19 | LB | Nieke Kühne | 9 September 2004 (age 22) | 1.84 m | 27 | 60 | (Germany) HSG Blomberg-Lippe |
| 20 | LB | Emily Vogel | 26 April 1998 (age 28) | 1.82 m | 152 | 467 | (Hungary) Ferencvárosi TC |
| 23 | LB | Annika Lott | 7 December 1999 (age 26) | 1.80 m | 58 | 120 | (France) Brest Bretagne Handball |
| 24 | GK | Sarah Wachter | 16 December 1999 (age 26) | 1.83 m | 63 | 2 | (Germany) Borussia Dortmund |
| 29 | LW | Antje Döll | 3 October 1988 (age 38) | 1.70 m | 122 | 354 | (Germany) Sport-Union Neckarsulm |
| 30 | RW | Jenny Behrend | 20 January 1996 (age 30) | 1.72 m | 102 | 206 | (Germany) VfL Oldenburg |
| 31 | LW | Alexia Hauf | 18 July 1998 (age 28) | 1.62 m | 47 | 89 | (Germany) HSG Blomberg-Lippe |
| 42 | GK | Katharina Filter | 4 February 1999 (age 27) | 1.80 m | 90 | 7 | (Denmark) Team Esbjerg |
| 77 | RB | Viola Leuchter | 15 June 2004 (age 22) | 1.87 m | 55 | 148 | (Denmark) Odense Håndbold |

=== Coaches ===
| Coach | Period |
|---|---|
| (Germany) Carl Schelenz | 1930 |
| (Germany) Otto Kaundinya | 1939 |
| (Germany) Fritz Fromm | 1952–1953 |
| Hans Geilenberg | 1954–1967 |
| Helmut Torka | 1967–1971 |
| (Germany) Volker Schneller | 1972–1974 |
| Werner Vick | 1974–1981 |
| (Germany) Gerd Tschochohei | 1981–1983 |
| (Germany) Ekke Hoffmann | 1983–1988 |
| (Germany) Ulrich Weiler | 1988–1990 |
| (Germany) Heinz Strauch | 1991–1992 |
| (Germany) Lothar Doering | 1992–1994 |
| (Germany) Ingolf Wiegert | 1994–1995 |
| (Germany) Ekke Hoffmann | 1995–1999 |
| (Germany) Lothar Doering | 1999 |
| (Germany) Dago Leukefeld | 2000–2001 |
| (Poland) Leszek Krowicki | 2001 |
| (Germany) Ekke Hoffmann | 2001–2004 |
| (Germany) Armin Emrich | 2005–2009 |
| (Germany) Rainer Osmann | 2009–2011 |
| (Denmark) Heine Jensen | 2011–2014 |
| (Denmark) Jakob Vestergaard | 2015–2016 |
| (Germany) Michael Biegler | 2016–2017 |
| (Netherlands) Henk Groener | 2018–2022 |
| (Germany) Markus Gaugisch | 2022– |

=== Individual all-time records ===
Still active players are highlighted

==== Most matches played ====
Total number of matches played for the senior national team.

| # | Player | Matches | Goals |
|---|---|---|---|
| 1 | Grit Jurack | 306 | 1581 |
| 2 | Michaela Erler | 285 | 690 |
| 3 | Anna Loerper | 246 | 428 |
| 4 | Silvia Schmitt | 245 | 751 |
| 5 | Anja Althaus | 243 | 527 |
| 6 | Andrea Stolletz | 227 | 1 |
| 7 | Stefanie Melbeck | 223 | 483 |
| 8 | Kathrin Blacha | 222 | 435 |
| 8 | Clara Woltering | 222 | 1 |
| 10 | Dagmar Stelberg | 219 | 832 |

Last updated: 1 October 2025

==== Most goals scored ====
Total number of goals scored in official matches only.

| # | Player | Goals | Matches | Average |
|---|---|---|---|---|
| 1 | Grit Jurack | 1581 | 306 | 5.2 |
| 2 | Dagmar Stelberg | 832 | 219 | 3.8 |
| 3 | Bianca Urbanke-Rösicke | 775 | 203 | 3.8 |
| 4 | Silvia Schmitt | 751 | 245 | 245 |
| 5 | Nadine Krause | 741 | 188 | 3.9 |
| 6 | Michaela Erler | 690 | 285 | 2.4 |
| 7 | Elena Leonte | 530 | 95 | 5.6 |
| 8 | Anja Althaus | 527 | 243 | 2.2 |
| 9 | Stefanie Melbeck | 483 | 223 | 2.2 |
| 10 | Kathrin Blacha | 435 | 222 | 1.9 |

Last updated: 1 October 2025

=== Former notable players ===
- Grit Jurack
- Nadine Krause
- Stefanie Melbeck
- Sabine Englert
- Clara Woltering
- Anja Althaus
- Anna Loerper
- Nora Reiche
- Svenja Huber
- Kerstin Wohlbold
- Nina Wörz
- Susann Müller
- Anne Müller
- Katja Kramarczyk
- Laura Steinbach
- Isabell Klein

Several German players have seen their individual performance recognized at international tournaments, either as topscorer or as a member of the All-Star Team.

All-Star Team

- Silvia Schmitt, 1992 Olympics
- Bianca Urbanke, 1994 European Championship
- Silke Fittinger, 1994 European Championship
- Franziska Heinz, 1997 World Championship
- Agnieszka Tobiasz, 2000 European Championship
- Grit Jurack, 2004 European Championship; 2008 European Championship; 2005 World Championship;

2007 World Championship; 2010 European Championship

- Nadine Krause, 2006 European Championship
- Anja Althaus, 2012 European Championship; 2013 World Championship
- Susann Müller, 2013 World Championship
- Alicia Stolle, 2018 European Championship
- Antje Döll, 2025 World Championship
- Emily Vogel, 2025 World Championship
- Viola Leuchter, 2023 World Championship; 2025 World Championship

Topscorer

- Nadine Krause, 2005 World Championship (60 goals); 2006 European Championship (58 goals)
- Grit Jurack, 2007 World Championship (86 goals)
- Susann Müller, 2013 World Championship (62 goals)
