= Dagmar Stelberg =

German handball player (born 1958)

Personal information
- Nationality: German
- Born: 21 September 1958 (age 68) Engelskirchen, West Germany
- Height: 176 cm (69 in)

Sport
- Sport: Handball
- Position: Right back

Senior clubs
- Years: Team
- –: Vfl Engelskirchen
- 1988-1998: TuS Walle Bremen
- –: Werder Bremen
National team
Years	Team	Apps	(Gls)
–	West Germany	219	(832)

Dagmar Stelberg (born 21 September 1958) is a German handball player who played for the West German national team. She was born in Engelskirchen. She represented West Germany at the 1984 Summer Olympics in Los Angeles, where the West German team placed fourth.

She was the top scorer in the German league 4 seasons in a row from 1983-84 to 1986-87.
