= Tonje Sagstuen =

Norwegian handball player (born 1971)

- Born: 17 September 1971 (age 55); Lørenskog, Norway
- Occupations: Handball player Journalist and newspaper editor Business executive
- Employers: Oppland Arbeiderblad; Norsk Tipping
- Awards: Håndballstatuetten (1999)
- Handball career
- Sport: Handball
- Current club: Retired

Senior clubs
- Years: Team
- –: Toten HK
- –: Borussia Dortmund
- –: IK Junkeren
National team
Years	Team	Apps	(Gls)
1989–1998	Norway	217	(593)
Medal record
Representing Norway
Women's handball
Olympic Games
Silver medal – second place	1992 Barcelona	Team
World Championship
Silver medal – second place	1997 Germany
Bronze medal – third place	1993 Norway
European Championship
Bronze medal – third place	1994 Germany

Tonje Sagstuen (born 17 November 1971) is a Norwegian former team handball player, journalist, newspaper editor, and gambling executive.

Playing for the Norway women's national handball team, she won silver medals at the 1992 Summer Olympics and the 1997 world championships. She was awarded the Håndballstatuetten trophy in 1999. A journalist since 1999, she was appointed editor-in-chief of the newspaper Oppland Arbeiderblad in 2012. She was chief executive officer of the gambling company Norsk Tipping from 2023 to 2025.

== Personal life ==
Sagstuen was born in Lørenskog on 17 November 1971.

== Handball career ==
=== Club career ===
Sagstuen played handball for the clubs Toten HK, Borussia Dortmund and IK Junkeren.

=== International career ===
Sagstuen played 217 games for the Norway women's national handball team during her career, scoring 593 goals.

She won a silver medal at the 1992 Summer Olympics in Barcelona, with the Norwegian team. After defeating Soviet Union in the semi final, Norway lost against South Korea in the final.

Further international achievements are winning the bronze medal at the 1993 World Women's Handball Championship, and bronze at the 1994 European Women's Handball Championship.

She was part of the Norwegian team at the 1997 World Women's Handball Championship in Germany, where Norway reached the final, which they lost to Denmark, thus winning the silver medals. Scoring 59 goals, Sagstuen listed number three on the top scorer list, and was also selected to the all-star team of the championship.

=== Awards ===
She was awarded the Håndballstatuetten trophy from the Norwegian Handball Federation in 1999.

== Media and business career ==
From 1999 Sagstuen was assigned as sports journalist for the newspaper Oppland Arbeiderblad. She eventually assumed editor functions from 2006, and served as assistant chief editor in 2011. In 2012, she became the new editor-in-chief of Oppland Arbeiderblad.

Sagstuen was part of the administrative group of the gambling company Norsk Tipping from 2014. In 2023 she was appointed acting CEO of Norsk Tipping, succeeding Thor Gjermund Eriksen. In November 2023 she was appointed the new permanent director of Norsk Tipping. She resigned from her position as chief executive in June 2025. Her resignation came following a severe error, when nearly fifty thousand gamblers received the false information from Norsk Tipping that they had won millions in a lottery. In the aftermath oh her resignation, discussions appeared in the press whether her generous compensation package amounting to more than 3 million NOK was appropriate or not.

She was appointed strategy and communications director for the employers' organisation Spekter from December 2025.
