= Karina Jespersen =

Danish handball player (born 1981)

Personal information
- Nationality: Danish
- Born: 20 March 1975 (age 51)

Sport
- Sport: Handball
- Position: Playmaker
- Current club: Retired

Senior clubs
- Years: Team
- 1995–2001: Frederiksberg IF
- 2001–2002: Skovbakken
- 2002–2003: FC Copenhagen
- 2003–2004: Mortara
- 2004: Fox Team Nord
- 2004–2006: HC Teramo
- 2006–2007: SS Pallamano Bancole
- 2007–2009: Ariosto Pallamano Ferrara
- 2009–2011: BK Ydun
National team
Years	Team	Apps	(Gls)
1997–1998	Denmark	32	(35)
Medal record
World Championship
Gold medal – first place	1997 Germany
European Championship
Silver medal – second place	1998 Netherlands	Team

Karina Jespersen (born 20 March 1975) is a Danish handball player, who was part of the Danish team that won the 1997 World Women's Handball Championship.

== Career ==
She started her handball career at Frederiksberg IF, before joined Skovbakken in 2001 together with Natasja Dybmose. A year later she joined FC Copenhagen Handball, which had just been founded and were playing on the club license of her former club FIF.

She then joined Mortara in Italy for half a single season, before she returned to Denmark and joined Fox Team Nord in January 2004.

The following summer she joined HC Teramo in Italy followed by SS Pallamano Bancole and Ariosto Pallamano Ferrara. In 2009 she returned to Denmark once again to join BK Ydun. She retired in 2011, but have afterwards played in the lower leagues.

After her handball career, she has worked as a physiotherapist.

== National team ==
Jespersen played 32 games for the Danish national team between 1997 and 1998.

She was part of the team that won the 1997 World Women's Handball Championship, which was Denmark's first World Championship title. She also represented Denmark at the 1998 European Women's Handball Championship, where she won a silver medal.
