= TV 1893 Neuhausen =

German handball club

- Full name: Turnverein 1893 Neuhausen e. V
- Short name: TVN
- Founded: 1893
- Arena: Paul Horn-Arena
- Capacity: 3,180
- Head coach: Markus Gaugisch
- League: Württembergliga
- Club colours
| Home | Away |

TV 1893 Neuhausen is a handball club from Neuhausen an der Erms, a quarter of Metzingen, Baden-Württemberg, Germany.

They were promoted to the Bundesliga in 1973, but where relegated the season after. In the 2011-12 they were promoted from the Second Bundesliga to the Bundesliga. This makes them the German team with the longest period between seasons in the top division. This meant they had to move to the Paul Horn-Arena in Tübingen as their former arena Hofbühlhalle did not match the Bundesliga requirements.

They were however relegated once again after only a season. In the 2016-17 season they were relegated from the 2nd Bundesliga to the 3. Liga after finishing in 19th out of 20.

In May 2018 the team was declared insolvent and from the 2018-19 season they have been playing in the Oberliga.

== Crest, colours, supporters ==
=== Kits ===
HOME

2010-12
