= Lone Mathiesen =

Danish handball player (born 1972)

Personal information
- Full name: Lone Mathiesen Laugesen
- Nationality: Danish
- Born: 28 January 1972 (age 54) Ry, Denmark
- Height: 160 cm (63 in)

Sport
- Sport: Handball
- Position: Left wing

Youth career
- Years: Team
- –: Knudsø BK
- –: Brabrand IF

Senior clubs
- Years: Team
- 1991–1992: Knudsø BK
- 1992–2003: IK Skovbakken
National team
Years	Team	Apps	(Gls)
1996–1999	Denmark	22	(37)
Medal record
World Championship
Gold medal – first place	1997 Germany

Lone Mathiesen (born 28 January 1972) is a Danish former handball player and World champion. She was part of the team that won the 1997 World Championship. Mathiesen played almost her entire career at IK Skovbakken in Denmark where she played more than 260 matches.

After the end of her top level career, she has continued at lower levels. She has a few times during injury crises helped her old club Skovbakken. Most prominently in SK Aarhus' 2010 Cup final against FCK Håndbold. Here she has also acted as coach.

== Private life ==
Lone Mathiesen is the mother of the current Danish handball player Julie Scaglione. Her son Mikkel is also a handball player in the Danish 1st Division.

She is educated public school teacher and has worked on several Danish boarding schools.
