= Merete Møller =

Danish handball player (born 1978)

Personal information
- Nationality: Danish
- Born: 7 May 1978 (age 48) Sønderborg, Denmark
- Height: 181 cm (71 in)

Sport
- Sport: Handball
- Position: Playmaker

Youth career
- Years: Team
- 1994-1996: Randers HK

Senior clubs
- Years: Team
- 1996-1997: Vorup FB
- 1997-1999: Randers HK
- 1999-2001: Larvik HK
National team
Years	Team	Apps	(Gls)
1997-2000	Denmark	37	(91)
Medal record
World Championships
Gold medal – first place	1997 Germany	Team competition

Merete Møller (born 7 May 1978) is a Danish former handball player and World champion. She was part of the team that won the 1997 World Championship.

In the 1996–97 season while playing for Vorup FB she was the top scorer in the Danish league with 163. In the 1998/1999 she won the Player of the year award in the Danish league. The following summer in 1999 she signed with Norwegian club Larvik HK. Here she won both the Norwegian league and the Norwegian cup. She retired aged only 23 after struggling with knee injuries and being released by her club Larvik HK when her contract expired in 2001.

Today she is an assistant professor at University of Southern Denmark in sports science.
