= Armin Emrich =

German handball player and coach (born 1951)

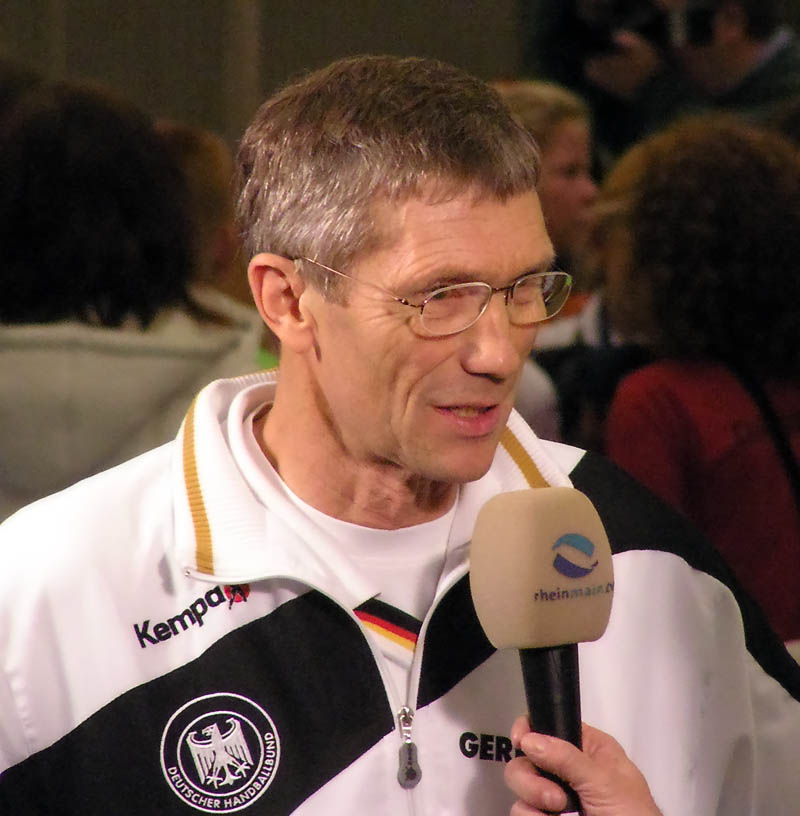
- Armin Emrich

Medal record

Coach for women's handball

Germany

World Women's Championships
Bronze medal – third place	2007 France	Team competition

Armin Emrich (born 16 June 1951) is a former German team handball player, and former head coach for the German women's national handball team. As coach he led the German team to bronze medal in the 2007 World Women's Handball Championship.

Sporting positions
Preceded by Ekke Hoffmann	Germany women's national handball team head coach 2005–2009	Succeeded by Rainer Osmann
