= Serie A1 (women's handball) =

The Serie A1 di pallamanno femminile is the premier division of the Italian women's handball national league. Established in 1970, it is currently contested by seven clubs.

PF Cassano Magnago is the championship's most successful club with eleven titles in a row between 1986 and 1996, while Jomi Salerno has been the most successful team in the 21st century so far with seven titles between 2004 and 2019. Most recently the 2018-19 edition was won by Jomi Salerno. The competition is currently not granted a spot in the Champions League, and instead its champion and runner-up take part in the EHF Cup.

== List of champions ==
- 1970 (Rome) Pareto Roma
- 1971 (Rome) CUS Roma
- 1972 (Rome) Scuola Germanica
- 1973 (Rome) Scuola Germanica
- 1974 (Rome) Montello Roma
- 1975 (Tuscany) Del Tongo Arezzo
- 1976 (Rome) Lem Roma
- 1977 (Rome) Del Tongo Roma
- 1978 (Trentino-Alto Adige/Südtirol) Brixen Damen
- 1979 (Trentino-Alto Adige/Südtirol) Brixen Damen
- 1980 (Emilia-Romagna) Mercury Bologna
- 1981 (Trentino-Alto Adige/Südtirol) Brixen Damen
- 1982 (Trentino-Alto Adige/Südtirol) Brixen Damen
- 1983 (Trentino-Alto Adige/Südtirol) Brixen Damen
- 1984 (Trentino-Alto Adige/Südtirol) Brixen Damen
- 1985 (Trentino-Alto Adige/Südtirol) Brixen Damen
- 1986 (Lombardy) Cassano Magnago
- 1987 (Lombardy) Cassano Magnago
- 1988 (Lombardy) Cassano Magnago
- 1989 (Lombardy) Cassano Magnago
- 1990 (Lombardy) Cassano Magnago
- 1991 (Lombardy) Cassano Magnago
- 1992 (Lombardy) Cassano Magnago
- 1993 (Lombardy) Cassano Magnago
- 1994 (Lombardy) Cassano Magnago
- 1995 (Lombardy) Cassano Magnago
- 1996 (Lombardy) Cassano Magnago
- 1997 (Emilia-Romagna) Rimini
- 1998 (Emilia-Romagna) Rimini
- 1999 (Sicily) De Gasperi Enna
- 2000 (Sicily) Eos Ina Siracusa
- 2001 (Veneto) Pidigi Dossobuono
- 2002 (Sicily) De Gasperi Enna
- 2003 (Sardinia) Sassari
- 2004 (Campania) Handball Salerno
- 2005 (Sardinia) Sassari
- 2006 (Sardinia) Sassari
- 2007 (Sardinia) Sassari
- 2008 (Sardinia) Sassari
- 2009 (Sardinia) Sassari
- 2010 (Campania) HT Salerno
- 2011 (Campania) HT Salerno
- 2012 (Abruzzo) Teramo
- 2013 (Campania) Handball Salerno
- 2014 (Campania) Handball Salerno
- 2015 (Apulia) Indeco Conversano
- 2016 (Apulia) Indeco Conversano
- 2017 (Campania) Handball Salerno
- 2018 (Campania) Handball Salerno
- 2019 (Campania) Handball Salerno
- 2020 Not awarded
- 2021 (Campania) Handball Salerno
- 2022 (Trentino-Alto Adige/Südtirol) Brixen Damen
- 2023 (Campania) Handball Salerno
- 2024 (Trentino-Alto Adige/Südtirol) Brixen Damen
- 2025 (Campania) Handball Salerno

== 2011-12 teams ==
- (Calabria) Gruppo Principe
- (Sicily) Messana
- (Sardinia) Nuorese
- (Rome) Roma Futura
- (Campania) Salerno
- (Sardinia) Sassari
- (Abruzzo) Teramo
