= Maybrit Nielsen =

Danish handball player (born 1968)

Personal information
- Nationality: Danish
- Born: 30 November 1968 (age 57) Glostrup, Denmark
- Height: 176 cm (69 in)

Sport
- Sport: Handball
- Position: Pivot

Senior clubs
- Years: Team
- 1990-1992, 1994-1998: Frederiksberg IF
- 1998-1999: Ajax København
- 1999-2000: ZVH Wiener Neustadt
- 2000-2001: Virum-Sorgenfri Håndboldklub
National team
Years	Team	Apps	(Gls)
1991-1997	Denmark	39	(45)
Medal record
Representing Denmark
World championships
Gold medal – first place	1997 Germany	Team competition

Maybrit Nielsen (born 30 November 1968) is a Danish former Handball player and handball coach playing as pivot. She was part of the Danish national team that won the 1997 World Women's Handball Championship.

In 1987 she was part of the team that won the 1987 Women's Junior World Handball Championship.

After her playing career she became a handball coach, first in Albertslund IF, and later in her old club FIF.

She has a degree in Pedagogy.
