= Ágnes Farkas =

Hungarian handball player (born 1973)

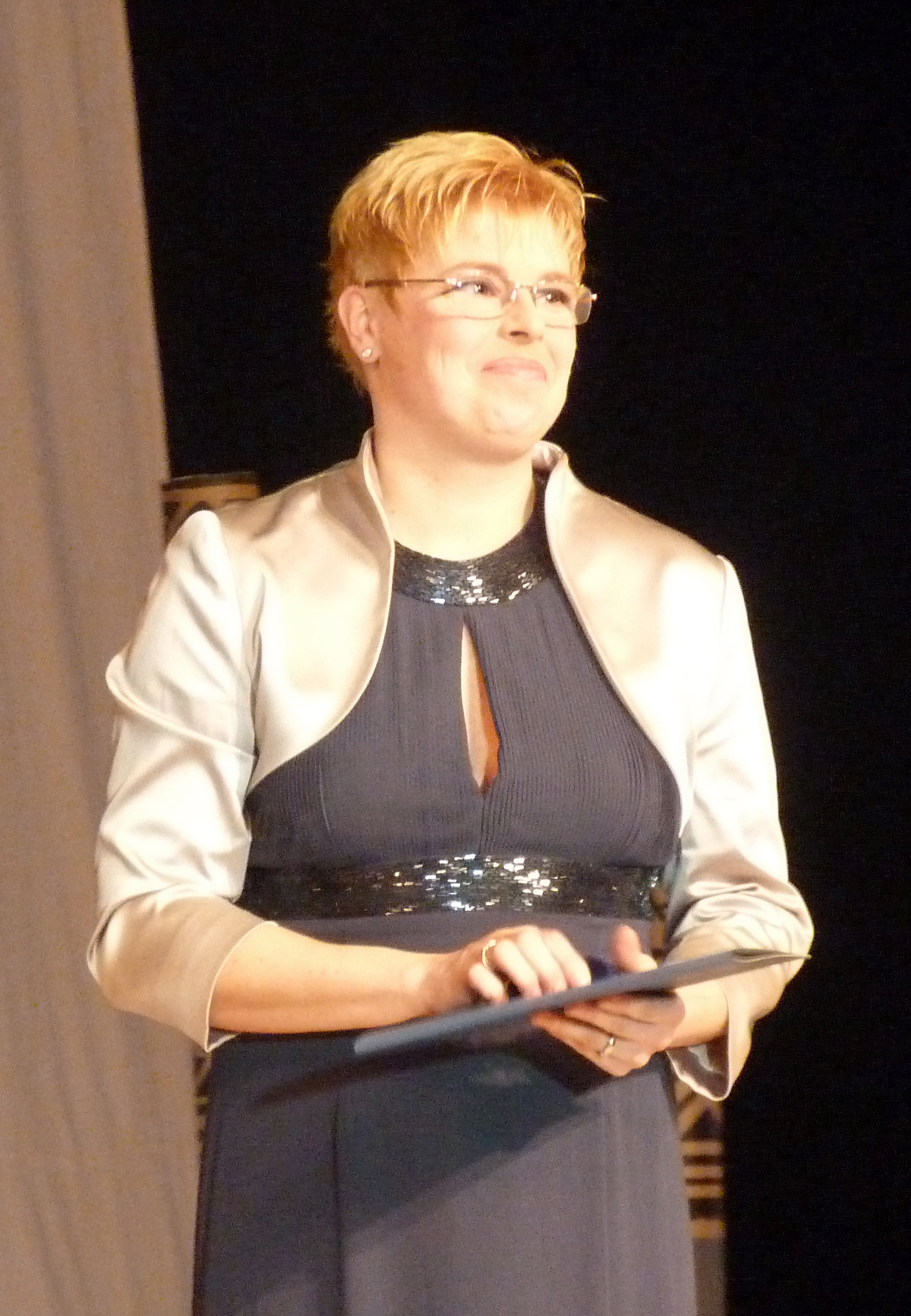
- Farkas in 2015

Personal information
- Full name: Ágnes Farkas
- Nationality: Hungarian
- Born: 21 April 1973 (age 53) Budapest, Hungary
- Height: 1.84 m (6 ft 0 in)

Sport
- Sport: Handball
- Position: Left Back

Senior clubs
- Years: Team
- –1992: Építők SC
- 1992–1993: Budapesti Spartacus SC
- 1993–1996: Ferencvárosi TC
- 1996–1997: Borussia Dortmund
- 1997–1999: Podravka Koprivnica
- 1999–2000: Dunaferr
- 2000–2003: Ferencvárosi TC
- 2003–2005: Aalborg DH
National team
Years	Team	Apps	(Gls)
1993–2004	Hungary	206	(944)
Medal record
Olympic Games
Silver medal – second place	2000 Sydney	Team
World Championship
Silver medal – second place	1995 Austria and Hungary	Team
Silver medal – second place	2003 Croatia	Team
European Championship
Gold medal – first place	2000 Romania	Team
Bronze medal – third place	1998 Netherlands	Team

Ágnes Farkas (born 21 April 1973) is a former Hungarian handball player. She won a gold medal at the 2000 European Championship, and earned a silver medal at the 2000 Summer Olympics and at the 1995 and 2003 World Championships.

== Career ==
=== Club ===
Farkas started to play handball for Építők SC, where she stayed until 1992, when she moved to Budapesti Spartacus. A year later, she joined Ferencvárosi TC, where she spent six seasons. There, she achieved her greatest club successes, including league and cup titles, EHF Champions League and EHF Cup silver medals. Thanks to her performances over the years, she is regarded as a club icon by Ferencváros fans.

She also competed abroad, playing for German side Borussia Dortmund and later collecting two Croatian cup and Croatian championship title with Podravka Koprivnica. Farkas played her last seasons for Danish side Aalborg DH, crowning her career with a Danish league silver in her final year.

Although in April 2005, Gjerpen IF offered her a one-year contract with the option for another year, Farkas stated she has no desire to stay in professional handball and eventually retired at the end of the season.

However, she did not stay away from the sport entirely after her retirement, as she trains children.

=== International ===
She debuted on the Hungarian national team on 16 October 1993 against Poland, and participated in her first World Championship in that year, finishing seventh. In 1994, she was named the top scorer of the European Championship. One year later, she was a member of the team that won a silver medal at the World Championship, organized jointly by Austria and Hungary. In 1996, she was forced to the sidelines by an injury and missed both the Olympic Games and the European Championship that year.

She placed ninth in the World Championship in 1997. She won a bronze medal on the European Championship the next year and finished fifth in 1999. She was a member of the 2000 Summer Olympics silver medal team, and was also selected to the squad that triumphed at the European Championship the same year. In 2002, she achieved fifth place in the European Championship with Hungary and was given the award as top scorer.

She participated on the 2003 World Championship and also took part at the 2004 Summer Olympics in Athens, where Hungary finished fifth.

== Achievements ==
=== Club ===
- Nemzeti Bajnokság I:
  - Winner: 1991, 1994, 1995, 1996, 2002
- Magyar Kupa:
  - Winner: 1992, 1994, 1995, 1996, 2000, 2003
- German Cup:
  - Winner: 1997
- Croatian Championship:
  - Winner: 1998, 1999
- Croatian Cup:
  - Winner: 1998, 1999
- Damehåndboldligaen:
  - Silver Medallist: 2005
- EHF Champions League:
  - Finalist: 2002
- EHF Cup Winners' Cup:
  - Finalist: 1994
- EHF Cup:
  - Finalist: 1997
- EHF Champions Trophy:
  - Winner: 1999
  - Third Placed: 2002

=== International ===
- Olympic Games:
  - Silver Medalist: 2000
- World Championship:
  - Silver Medalist: 1995, 2003
- European Championship:
  - Winner: 2000
  - Bronze Medalist: 1998

== Awards and recognition ==
- European Championship Top Scorer: 1994, 2002
- Nemzeti Bajnokság I Top Scorer: 2001
- Hungarian Handballer of the Year: 2001, 2002
- Knight's Cross of the Order of Merit of the Republic of Hungary:2000
