= Paul Horn-Arena =

Indoor sporting arena in Tübingen, Germany

Coordinates: 48°30′37″N 9°02′31″E

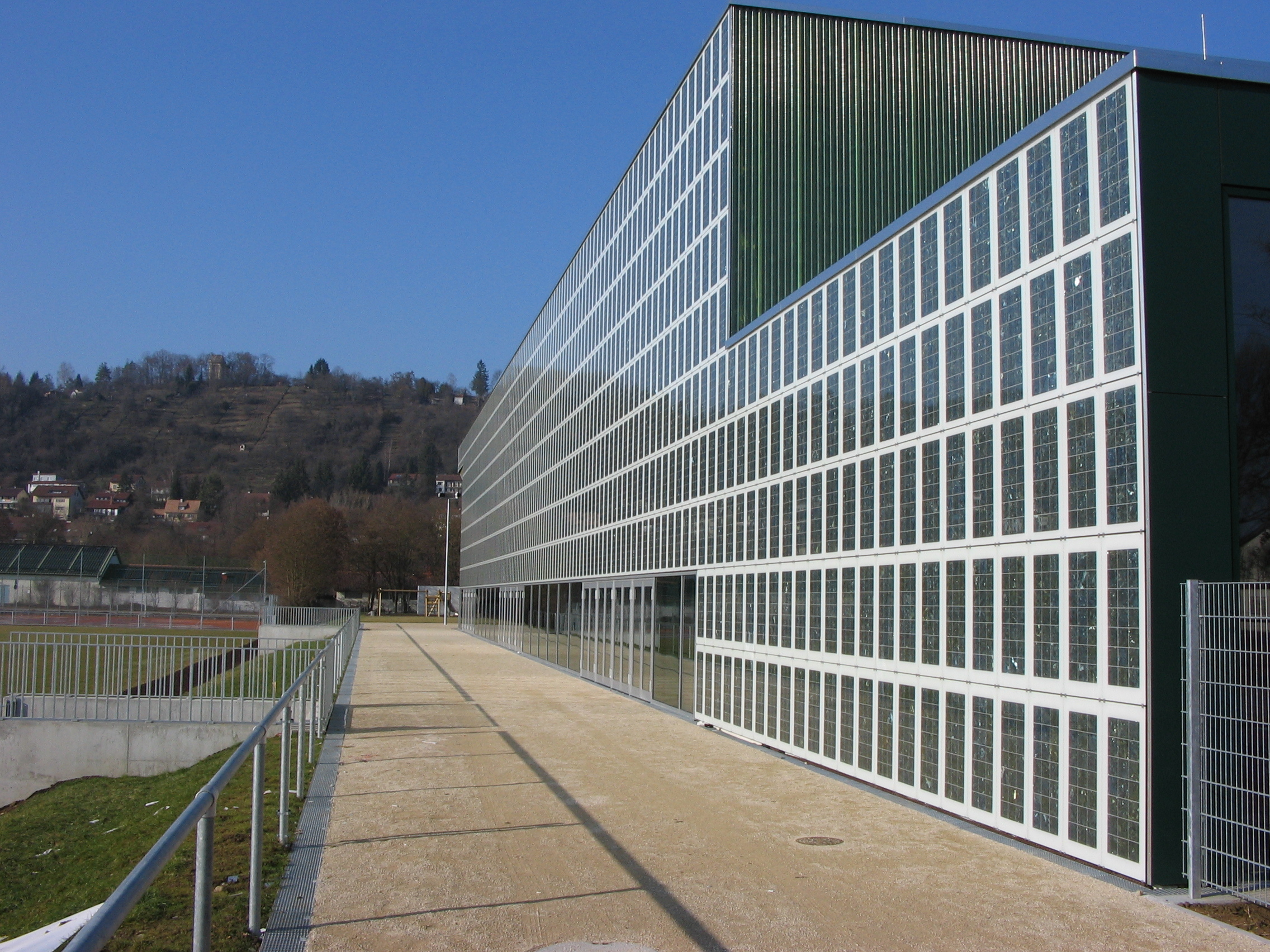
Tübingen, sports hall with Photovoltaics

The Paul Horn-Arena (until 2007 TüArena) is an indoor sporting arena located in Tübingen, Germany. The capacity of the arena is 3,132 people. It is currently (2012/13) home to the Walter Tigers Tübingen (basketball), TV 1893 Neuhausen (handball) and TV Rottenburg (volleyball).
