= Qian Weicheng =

Qian Weicheng (traditional Chinese: 錢維城; simplified Chinese: 钱维城; pinyin: Qián wéichéng) was one of the foremost Orthodox School landscapists and flower painters of the eighteenth century. Enjoying a brilliant official career, Qian rose to the rank of vice-president of the Board of Works. At the same time, the Qianlong Emperor considered him to be one of the outstanding painters of the age. In over twenty years' service at court, Qian Weicheng produced more than 275 paintings for the emperor. Even after Qian's death in 1772, the emperor continued, as on this album, to add appreciative inscriptions.

== Life ==
Qian Weicheng (style name Zongpan, sobriquet You’an), a native of Changzhou, Jiangsu, came in first place in the civil service exams of 1745. In painting, he looked back to the Four Yuan Masters and more recently in his day to the Four Wangs of the Qing. Receiving instruction from Dong Bangda, he also entered the Southern Studio at court.

== Works ==
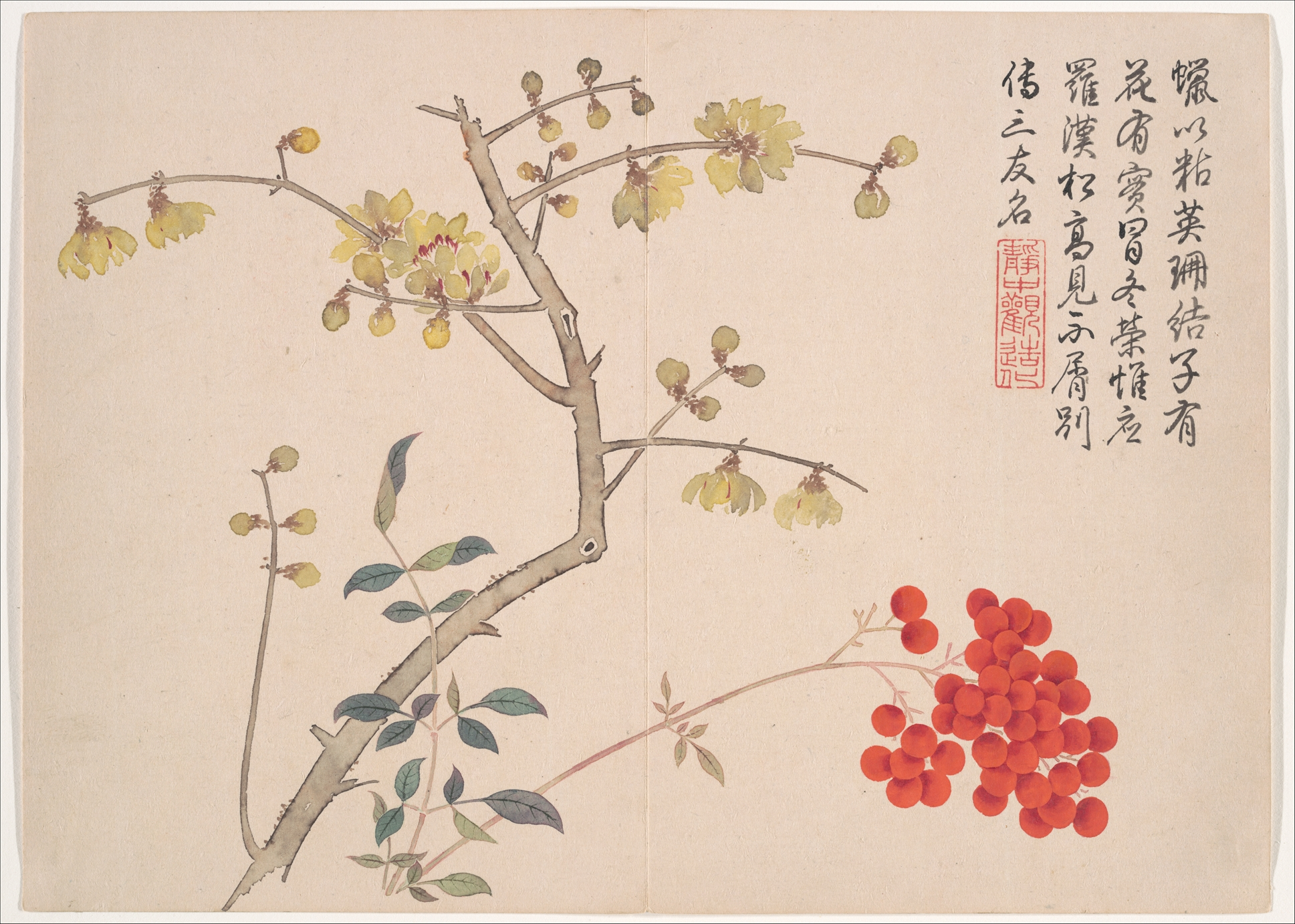
Winter Landscapes and Flowers by Qian Weicheng

This album originally formed part of a four-volume set depicting scenery and flowers of the four seasons. Representing the varied faces of winter, the twelve paintings in the album alternate between the soft grays and muted colors of wintry landscapes and the intense colors of seasonal flowers.

This work illustrates a poem by the Qianlong Emperor. With meticulous brushwork, it depicts the imperial bodyguard pushing and pulling a yellow ice-sled tent on which Qianlong rides, slowly making their way across the Taiye Lake of the Western Gardens. In the white lyricism of this ice-bound land and light flying snow, figures dot the landscape set off against the wide frozen lake and imperial buildings on the banks.
