= Zhang Geng =

Chinese team handball player (born 1980)

Personal information
- Nationality: Chinese
- Born: 9 March 1980 (age 46)

Sport
- Sport: Handball

Senior clubs
- Years: Team
- –: Guangdong
National team
- Years: Team
- –: China

Zhang Geng (born 9 March 1980) is a Chinese team handball player. Playing on the Chinese national team, she competed at the 2008 Summer Olympics in Beijing, where China placed sixth.
