= Helle Simonsen (handballer) =

Danish handball player (born 1976)

Personal information
- Full name: Helle Kaldal Simonsen
- Nationality: Danish
- Born: 27 August 1976 (age 50) Aars, Denmark
- Height: 175 cm (69 in)

Sport
- Sport: Handball

Senior clubs
- Years: Team
- 1995-1997: LSU Sæby
- 1997-2001: Viborg HK
National team
Years	Team	Apps	(Gls)
1996–1998	Denmark	39	(95)
Medal record
World Championship
Gold medal – first place	1997 Germany

Helle Kaldal Riisager (born Helle Simonsen, 27 August 1976) is a Danish former handball player. She was part of the team that won the 1997 World Championship and also played for Viborg HK where she won multiple EHF Champions Leagues.

Her career ended prematurely when she was 25 due to injuries.

She debuted for the Danish national team on 20 February 1996 against Sweden.

In 2001 she became a part of the sales department at Viborg HK, and was later promoted to chief of marketing. She was in this position until 2013.
