= 1997 World Women's Handball Championship =

1997 edition of the World Women's Handball Championship

Tournament details
- Host country: Germany
- Dates: 30 November - 14 December 1997
- Teams: 24

Final positions
- Champions: Denmark (1st title)
- Runners-up: Norway
- Third place: Germany
- Fourth place: Russia

Tournament statistics
- Matches played: 80
- Goals scored: 4,083 (51.04 per match)
- Top scorer: (North Macedonia) Indira Kastratović 71 goals

Awards
- Best player: (Germany) Franziska Heinz

The 1997 IHF World Women's Handball Championship took place in Germany 30 November – 14 December 1997. It was the first tournament with 24 teams. Denmark won its first World Championship title. Denmark's only defeat in the championship was by Macedonia.

The tournament was also remembered for a tragic incident in the stands during one match of the semi-final matches, between Denmark and Russia (32-22), when a fight broke out between a Danish and a German spectator. The fight developed into the German taking out a knife and stabbing the Dane. Another Danish spectator tried to intervene, but was stabbed himself. Both Danes soon died, and the German was soon arrested by the police. He admitted to the stabbing during the police interrogation, and said that he committed it while under the influence of alcohol.

== Host Cities ==
The matches were held in the cities of Berlin, Hanover, Saarbrücken, Hamburg, Sindelfingen, Neubrandenburg and Rotenburg an der Fulda. The semi-finals and finals were held in the Berlin in the Max-Schmeling-Halle.

== Group stage ==
=== Group A ===
Pos	Team	Pld	W	D	L	GF	GA	GD	Pts	Qualification
1	Germany	5	5	0	0	153	92	+61	10	Round of 16
2	Poland	5	4	0	1	129	114	+15	8	Round of 16
3	Austria	5	3	0	2	132	115	+17	6	Round of 16
4	Angola	5	1	1	3	126	143	−17	3	Round of 16
5	Japan	5	1	1	3	105	130	−25	3	
6	Brazil	5	0	0	5	104	155	−51	0	

Germany	32–17	Japan
	(16–7)

Austria	36–23	Brazil
	(18–12)

Poland	29–24	Angola
	(15–10)

Japan	16–24	Austria
	(8–13)

Brazil	19–32	Poland
	(7–15)

Angola	20–32	Germany
	(11–12)

Japan	25–21	Brazil
	(10–9)

Germany	29–19	Poland
	(14–9)

Austria	29–22	Angola
	(13–9)

Germany	32–18	Brazil
	(17–6)

Angola	30–30	Japan
	(15–16)

Poland	26–25	Austria
	(14–11)

Brazil	23–30	Angola
	(12–17)

Poland	23–17	Japan
	(12–10)

Austria	18–28	Germany
	(10–14)

=== Group B ===
Pos	Team	Pld	W	D	L	GF	GA	GD	Pts	Qualification
1	Croatia	5	5	0	0	146	90	+56	10	Round of 16
2	Norway	5	4	0	1	155	93	+62	8	Round of 16
3	France	5	3	0	2	140	95	+45	6	Round of 16
4	Belarus	5	2	0	3	122	125	−3	4	Round of 16
5	Canada	5	0	1	4	77	139	−62	1	
6	Uzbekistan	5	0	1	4	83	181	−98	1	

Croatia	27–14	Canada
	(16–6)

Norway	34–21	Belarus
	(14–12)

France	39–17	Uzbekistan
	(17–8)

Uzbekistan	15–45	Croatia
	(10–19)

Canada	15–32	Norway
	(7–17)

Belarus	17–30	France
	(10–15)

Canada	13–30	Belarus
	(7–10)

Norway	44–13	Uzbekistan
	(20–5)

Croatia	21–20	France
	(7–13)

Croatia	28–19	Belarus
	(12–9)

Uzbekistan	18–18	Canada
	(10–8)

France	19–23	Norway
	(10–9)

Belarus	35–20	Uzbekistan
	(14–9)

France	32–17	Canada
	(18–7)

Norway	22–25	Croatia
	(11–13)

=== Group C ===
Pos	Team	Pld	W	D	L	GF	GA	GD	Pts	Qualification
1	South Korea	5	5	0	0	160	101	+59	10	Round of 16
2	Hungary	5	4	0	1	156	102	+54	8	Round of 16
3	Romania	5	3	0	2	153	124	+29	6	Round of 16
4	Ivory Coast	5	2	0	3	121	129	−8	4	Round of 16
5	Algeria	5	1	0	4	101	146	−45	2	
6	Uruguay	5	0	0	5	74	163	−89	0	

Romania	44–23	Algeria
	(25–9)

Hungary	36–12	Uruguay
	(19–7)

South Korea	30–24	Ivory Coast
	(18–12)

Uruguay	15–34	Romania
	(9–14)

Ivory Coast	21–33	Hungary
	(6–17)

Algeria	16–35	South Korea
	(5–18)

Romania	26–30	Hungary
	(14–19)

Algeria	20–21	Ivory Coast
	(9–12)

South Korea	35–11	Uruguay
	(15–4)

Romania	28–26	Ivory Coast
	(12–10)

Uruguay	18–29	Algeria
	(5–15)

Hungary	29–30	South Korea
	(17–16)

Ivory Coast	29–18	Uruguay
	(15–6)

Hungary	28–13	Algeria
	(16–5)

South Korea	30–21	Romania
	(13–12)

=== Group D ===
Pos	Team	Pld	W	D	L	GF	GA	GD	Pts	Qualification
1	Russia	5	4	1	0	128	111	+17	9	Round of 16
2	Macedonia	5	3	1	1	124	115	+9	7	Round of 16
3	Denmark	5	3	1	1	161	114	+47	7	Round of 16
4	Czech Republic	5	2	1	2	136	145	−9	5	Round of 16
5	Slovenia	5	1	0	4	136	158	−22	2	
6	China	5	0	0	5	118	160	−42	0	

Macedonia	26–22	Slovenia
	(11–11)

Russia	27–24	Czech Republic
	(10–12)

Denmark	38–16	China
	(17–9)

Slovenia	27–30	Russia
	(11–15)

China	24–30	Macedonia
	(11–19)

Czech Republic	27–41	Denmark
	(12–23)

Russia	22–19	Macedonia
	(9–8)

Czech Republic	30–25	China
	(14–13)

Denmark	37–24	Slovenia
	(22–09)

Slovenia	28–31	Czech Republic
	(10–18)

Russia	27–19	China
	(16–7)

Macedonia	25–23	Denmark
	(15–8)

China	34–35	Slovenia
	(19–17)

Macedonia	24–24	Czech Republic
	(9–12)

Denmark	22–22	Russia
	(12–12)

== Final round ==
Round of 16
B1	Croatia	30
A4	Angola	22
D3	Denmark	30
C2	Hungary	25
B3	France	20
A2	Poland	30
D1	Russia	28
C4	Ivory Coast	20
C3	Romania	33
D2	Macedonia	37
A1	Germany	33
B4	Belarus	23
A3	Austria	18
B2	Norway	24
C1	South Korea	29
D4	Czech Republic	26

Quarterfinals
B1	Croatia	21
D3	Denmark	25
A2	Poland	19
D1	Russia	24
D2	Macedonia	19
A1	Germany	24
B2	Norway	27
C1	South Korea	21

Semifinals
D3	Denmark	32
D1	Russia	22
A1	Germany	23
B2	Norway	25

Final
D3	Denmark	33
B2	Norway	20
Third place
D1	Russia	25
A1	Germany	27

=== Round of 16 ===
France	20–30	Poland
	(11–16)

Germany	33–23	Belarus
	(16–8)

Austria	18–24	Norway
	(12–6)

Croatia	30–22	Angola
	(14–8)

South Korea	29–26	Czech Republic
	(16–10)

Denmark	30–25	Hungary
	(19–12)

Romania	33–37	Macedonia
	(33–37 - 27–27 - 29–29 - 15–13)

Russia	28–20	Ivory Coast
	(11–11)

=== Quarterfinals ===
Germany	24–19	Macedonia
	(13–7)

Poland	19–24	Russia
	(8–13)

Denmark	25–21	Croatia
	(14–7)

South Korea	21–27	Norway
	(12–15)

=== Semifinals ===
For places 1-4

Germany	23–25	Norway
	(9–11)

Denmark	32–22	Russia
	(19–12)

For places 5-8

South Korea	34–26	Macedonia
	(22–12)

Poland	19–20	Croatia
	(8–9)

=== Finals ===
Norway	20–33	Denmark
	(11–14)

Germany	27–25	Russia
	(16–12)

South Korea	33–32	Croatia
	(28–28 - 14–15)

Macedonia	36–34	Poland
	(30–30 - 18–12)

== Final standings ==
1 Denmark
2 Norway
3 Germany
4 Russia
5 South Korea
6 Croatia
7 Macedonia
8 Poland
9 Hungary
10 France
11 Austria
12 Romania
13 Czech Republic
14 Ivory Coast
15 Angola
16 Belarus
17 Japan
18 Slovenia
19 Algeria
20 Canada
21 Uzbekistan
22 China
23 Brazil
24 Uruguay

=== World champions ===
- Lene Rantala
- Anne Dorthe Tanderup
- Helle Simonsen
- Camilla Andersen
- Tina Bøttzau
- Anette Hoffman
- Lone Mathiesen
- Janne Kolling
- Merete Møller
- Anja Andersen
- Gitte Sunesen
- Gitte Madsen
- Tonje Kjaergaard
- Susanne Munk Lauritsen
- Maybrit Nielsen
- Karina Jespersen

Trainer: Ulrik Wilbek

=== Top goalscorers ===
Rank	Name	Team	Goals
1	Indira Kastratović	Macedonia	71
2	Han Sun-hee	South Korea	63
3	Tonje Sagstuen	Norway	59
4	Roxana Stănișor	Romania	57
5	Aleksandra Pawelska	Poland	55
6	Grit Jurack	Germany	54
7	Valentina Radulović	Macedonia	52
7	Klaudija Bubalo	Croatia	52
9	Anja Andersen	Denmark	51
10	Monika Ludmilová	Czech Republic	50

=== All Star Team ===
- Goalkeeper: Susanne Munk Wilbek Denmark
- Left Wing: Han Sun-hee South Korea
- Left Back: Franziska Heinz Germany
- Center Back: Camilla Andersen Denmark
- Pivot: Natalia Deriougina Russia
- Right Back: Tonje Sagstuen Norway
- Right Wing: Natalia Malakhova Russia
