= 2003 World Women's Handball Championship squads =

List of handball players

The following squads and players competed in the World Women's Handball Championship in 2003 in Croatia.

== Angola ==
1. Maria Odeth Tavares
2. Maria Pedro
3. Justina Praça
4. Mária Teresa Neto Joaquim
5. Ilda Maria Bengue
6. Teresa Ulundo
7. Bombo Calandula
8. Filomena Trindade
9. Rosa Amaral
10. Maria Inês Jololo
11. Palmira de Almeida
12. Elisa Webba-Torres
13. Marcelina Kiala
14. Luísa Kiala
15. Elzira Tavares
16. Sami Maluisa Fernandes

== Argentina ==
1. Florencia Busso
2. Valentina Kogan
3. Mariana Mansilla
4. Natalia Nicolich
5. Bibiana Barbara Ferrea
6. Magdalena Decilio
7. Guadalupe Roman
8. Georgina Visciglia
9. Natacha Melillo
10. Nazaret Barile
11. Victoria Alvarez
12. Florencia Am
13. Karina Seif
14. Maria Pilar Romero

== Australia ==
1. Vera Ignjatovic
2. Catherine Kent
3. Shelley Roy
4. Olivia Doherty
5. Rosalie Boyd
6. Marina Kopcalic
7. Tracy Ashby
8. Raelene Boulton
9. Jovana Milosevic
10. Paola Leone
11. Caitlin Wynne
12. Lilly Maher
13. Mari Edland
14. Nanna Hedberg
15. Belinda Griffiths

== Austria ==
1. Nataliya Rusnachenko
2. Beate Hofmann
3. Sylvia Strass
4. Birgit Engl
5. Rima Sypkus
6. Stephanie Ofenböck
7. Sorina Teodorovic
8. Ausra Fridrikas
9. Edith Mika
10. Laura Fritz
11. Barbara Strass
12. Katrin Engel
13. Tanja Logwin
14. Dagmar Müller
15. Veronika Kreitmayr

== Brazil ==
1. Chana Franciela Masson
2. Darly Zoqbi de Paula
3. Fabiana Diniz
4. Alexandra do Nascimento
5. Ana Amorim
6. Maria Rosa Da Costa Pedro
7. Silvia Pinheiro
8. Alessandra Medeiros
9. Daniela Piedade
10. Juceli Aparecida Sales Da Rosa
11. Viviane Jacques
12. Aline Silva Dos Santos
13. Aline Da Conceicao Da Silva
14. Idalina Mesquita
15. Milene Figueiredo
16. Ana Paula Rodrigues

== China ==
1. Jie Fan
2. Ge Li Yu
3. Chao Zhai
4. Yun Liu
5. Bing Li
6. Niu
7. Yan Xia Cong
8. Li Zhang
9. Hong Xia Zhu
10. Min Wang
11. Wang Shasha
12. Ya Nan Wu
13. Lai Miao Sun
14. Su Fen Lei
15. Weiwei Li

== Croatia ==
1. Sanela Knezović
2. Barbara Stancin
3. Klaudija Klikovac
4. Dijana Golubić
5. Maida Arslanagić
6. Renata Hodak
7. Nataša Kolega
8. Nikica Pušić
9. Antonela Pensa
10. Svitlana Pasicnik
11. Maja Mitrović
12. Marina Kevo
13. Tihana Sarić
14. Marija Culjak
15. Ljerka Vresk

== Czech Republic ==
1. Lenka Černá
2. Vendula Ajglova
3. Pavla Skavronkova
4. Iva Zamorska
5. Lucie Fabikova
6. Martina Knytlova
7. Simona Roubinkova
8. Alena Polaskova
9. Jana Fischerova
10. Marta Adamkova
11. Petra Valova
12. Petra Čumplová
13. Katerina Vaskova
14. Jana Arnosova
15. Pavla Plaminkova
16. Jana Simerska

== Denmark ==
1. Lene Rantala
2. Rikke Poulsen Schmidt
3. Karin Mortensen
4. Heidi Johansen
5. Rikke Skov
6. Tine Ladefoged
7. Rikke Nielsen
8. Christina Roslyng
9. Rikke Hørlykke Jørgensen
10. Camilla Thomsen
11. Lise Knudsen
12. Anne Petersen
13. Katrine Fruelund
14. Karen Brødsgaard
15. Line Daugaard
16. Josephine Touray

== France ==
1. Stéphanie Cano
2. Joanne Dudziak
3. Myriame Saïd Mohamed
4. Isabelle Cendier Ajaguin
5. Sophie Herbrecht
6. Estelle Vogein
7. Leila Lejeune
8. Isabelle Wendling
9. Sandrine Delerce
10. Myriam Borg-Korfanty
11. Mélinda Jacques-Szabo
12. Stéphanie Ludwig
13. Nodjialem Myaro
14. Valérie Nicolas
15. Véronique Pecqueux-Rolland
16. Raphaëlle Tervel

== Germany ==
1. Sabine Englert
2. Sylvia Harlander
3. Clara Woltering
4. Ingrida Radzeviciute
5. Nadine Krause
6. Grit Jurack
7. Milica Danilovic
8. Nina Christin Wörz
9. Susanne Henze
10. Nikola Pietzsch
11. Melanie Schliecker
12. Kathrin Blacha
13. Anja Althaus
14. Heike Ahlgrimm
15. Heike Schmidt
16. Stefanie Melbeck

== Hungary ==
1. Irina Sirina
2. Bernadett Ferling
3. Beáta Bohus
4. Ibolya Mehlmann
5. Erika Kirsner
6. Hortenzia Szrnka
7. Bojana Radulovics
8. Krisztina Pigniczki
9. Ágnes Farkas
10. Tímea Sugár
11. Anita Görbicz
12. Eszter Siti
13. Katalin Pálinger
14. Tímea Tóth
15. Zsuzsanna Lovász
16. Anita Kulcsár

== Ivory Coast ==
1. Josee Lobouo
2. Edwige Marie J. Zadi
3. Justine Koffi
4. Catherine Seri Tape
5. Gertrude Bliva
6. Elodie N’Cho Mambo
7. Celine Affoua Dongo
8. Marie-Ange Gogbe
9. Julie Toualy
10. Paula Arlette Gondo
11. Alimata Dosso
12. Rosine Koabena
13. Fatoumata Diomande
14. Adeline Koudou

== Japan ==
1. Mami Tanaka
2. Kimiko Hida
3. Minako Morimoto
4. Kaori Onozawa
5. Mineko Tanaka
6. Masayo Oishi
7. Yuko Arihama
8. Kiha Inyoshi
9. Hitomi Sakugawa
10. Aiko Hayafune
11. Akiko Kinjo
12. Yumi Tomita
13. Akane Aoto
14. Shiori Kamimachi

== Norway ==
1. Cecilie Leganger
2. Heidi Tjugum
3. Katrine Lunde
4. Ragnhild Aamodt
5. Tonje Larsen
6. Katja Nyberg
7. Unni Nyhamar Hinkel
8. Else-Marthe Sørlie Lybekk
9. Monica Sandve
10. Kristine Lunde-Borgersen
11. Gro Hammerseng
12. Berit Hynne
13. Elisabeth Hilmo
14. Anette Hovind Johansen
15. Linn-Kristin Riegelhuth
16. Vigdis Hårsaker

== Romania ==
1. Ildiko Kerekes Barbu
2. Luminita Hutupan Dinu
3. Tereza Tamas
4. Gabriela Doina Hobjila
5. Ionela Gilca
6. Carmen Lungu
7. Mihaela Ani Senocico
8. Aurelia Brădeanu
9. Nicoleta Alina Dobrin
10. Cristina Vărzaru
11. Steluța Luca
12. Valentina Ardean-Elisei
13. Simona Gogîrlă
14. Aurica Valeria Beșe
15. Nicoleta Cristina Gisca
16. Georgeta Vartic

== Russia ==
1. Tatiana Alizar
2. Inna Suslina
3. Natalya Shipilova
4. Liudmila Pazich
5. Oksana Romenskaya
6. Lyudmila Postnova
7. Anna Kareyeva
8. Lyudmila Bodniyeva
9. Nadezda Muravyeva
10. Tatiana Diadetchko
11. Alina Dolgikh
12. Irina Poltoratskaya
13. Svetlana Smirnova
14. Yelena Chaplina
15. Anna Kurepta
16. Marina Naukovich

== Serbia and Montenegro ==
1. Sladana Đerić
2. Ana Vojčić
3. Jelena Popović
4. Ana Đokić
5. Ivana Mladenović
6. Ljiljana Knezević
7. Tanja Tomanović
8. Ana Batinić
9. Maja Savić
10. Bojana Petrović
11. Tanja Milanović
12. Svetlana Ognjenović
13. Marina Rokić
14. Adrijana Budimir
15. Jelena Savković
16. Slavica Stefanovic

== Slovenia ==
1. Miša Marinček
2. Nada Tutnjic
3. Barbara Gorski
4. Olga Ceckova
5. Mojca Dercar
6. Elena Krese
7. Deja Doler
8. Silvana Ilic
9. Vesna Vinčić-Pus
10. Nataliya Derepasko
11. Katja Kurent
12. Spela Cerar
13. Tanja Dajcman
14. Tatjana Oder
15. Beata Agnieszka Matuszewska
16. Anja Frešer

== South Korea ==
1. Oh Yong-ran
2. Woo Sun-hee
3. Huh Soon-young
4. Lee Gong-joo
5. Jang So-hee
6. Kim Cha-youn
7. Oh Seong-ok
8. Huh Young-sook
9. Moon Kyeong-ha
10. Lim O-kyeong
11. Park Jung-hee
12. Lee Sang-eun
13. Lee Min-hee
14. Myoung Bok-hee
15. Choi Im-jeong
16. Moon Pil-hee

== Spain ==
1. Elisabet Lopez Valledor
2. Maria Sanchez Bravo
3. Aitziber Elejaga Vargas
4. Lidia Sanchez Alias
5. Susana Pareja Ibarra
6. Vanessa Amoros Quiles
7. Cristina Esmeralda Lopez Quiros
8. Cristina Gomez Arquer
9. Marta Elisabet Mangue Gonzales
10. Soraya Garcia Leite
11. Montserrat Puche Diaz
12. Susana Fraile Celaya
13. Gemma Lujan Suarez
14. Veronica Maria Cuadrado Dehesa
15. Noelia Oncina Morena
16. Patricia Pinedo Saenz

== Tunisia ==
1. Noura Ben Slama
2. Mouna Chebbah
3. Rym Mannai
4. Hela Msaad
5. Raja Toumi
6. Ouided Kilani
7. Haifa Abdelhak
8. Rafika Ettaqui

== Ukraine ==
1. Natalya Borysenko
2. Irina Hontcharova
3. Larysa Zaspa
4. Iryna Chernova
5. Oksana Sakada
6. Kateryna Rybina
7. Maryna Vergelyuk
8. Olena Iatsenko
9. Ganna Syukalo
10. Olena Tsyhytsia
11. Nataliya Lyapina
12. Anastasiya Borodina
13. Oksana Raykhel
14. Yana Hyrholiunas
15. Iryna Shutska Sheyenko
16. Olena Radchenko

== Uruguay ==
1. Victoria Laicouschi Klosz
2. Polcaro Infanzon
3. Grana Vinoli
4. Claudia Porteiro Rodriguez
5. Ivanna Scavino Martinez
6. Marcela Schelotto Musetti
7. Mercedes Amor Estrago
8. Terragno Barrios
9. Veronica Castro Yanez
10. Jussara Castro Yanez
11. Maria Lorena Estefanell
12. Sofia Griot Gayoso
13. Mariana Fleitas Riera
14. Maria Noel Uriarte Radmilovic
