= 2002 European Women's Handball Championship squads =

The following squads and players competed in the European Women's Handball Championship in 2002 in Denmark.

== Austria ==
1. Nataliya Rusnatchenko
2. Beate Hofmann
3. Sylvia Strass
4. Birgit Engl
5. Rima Sypkus
6. Renata Cieloch
7. Stephanie Ofenböck
8. Manuela Szivatz
9. Sorina Teodorovic
10. Ausra Fridrikas
11. Edith Mika
12. Laura Fritz
13. Barbara Strass
14. Dagmar Müller
15. Katrin Engel
16. Alexandra Materzok

== Belarus ==
1. Natallia Petrakova
2. Alena Abramovich
3. Natallia Nalivaika
4. Raisa Tsikhanovich
5. Alla Matushkowitz
6. Natallia Siarko
7. Larissa Heil
8. Iryna Artsiomenka
9. Krystsina Svatko
10. Natallia Artsiomenka
11. Alesia Kurchankova
12. Hanna Halinskaya
13. Tatsiana Silitch
14. Tatsiana Khlimankova
15. Irina Kalpakova

== Czech Republic ==
1. Lenka Cerna
2. Vendula Ajglova
3. Iva Zamorska
4. Lucie Fabikova
5. Martina Knytlova
6. Simona Roubinkova
7. Alena Polaskova
8. Marta Adamkova
9. Lenka Romanova
10. Marcela Handlova
11. Petra Valova
12. Petra Cumplova
13. Jana Simerska
14. Katerina Vaskova
15. Pavla Skavronkova

== Denmark ==
1. Lene Rantala
2. Karin Mortensen
3. Ditte Andersen
4. Mette Vestergaard
5. Christina Roslyng Hansen
6. Heidi Johansen
7. Rikke Hørlykke
8. Winnie Mølgaard
9. Trine Jensen
10. Katrine Fruelund
11. Kristine Andersen
12. Karen Brødsgaard
13. Line Daugaard
14. Josephine Touray
15. Louise Bager Nørgaard
16. Camilla Thomsen

== France ==
1. Joanne Dudziak
2. Valérie Nicolas
3. Christiane Vanparys-Torres
4. Sandrine Delerce-Mariot
5. Melinda Szabó
6. Nodjalem Myaro
7. Véronique Pecqueux-Rolland
8. Myriame Said Mohamed
9. Stéphanie Cano
10. Isabelle Wendling
11. Myriam Korfanty
12. Stéphanie Ludwig
13. Alexandra Castioni
14. Raphaelle Tervel
15. Sophie Herbrecht
16. Stephanie Moreau

== Germany ==
1. Sabine Englert
2. Christine Lindemann
3. Nadine Härdter
4. Ingrida Radzeviciute
5. Anika Ziercke
6. Maren Baumbach
7. Nadine Krause
8. Janet Grunow
9. Nikola Pietzsch
10. Melanie Wagner
11. Kathrin Blacha
12. Heike Ahlgrimm
13. Heike Schmidt
14. Stefanie Melbeck
15. Corina Christenau

== Hungary ==
1. Tímea Sugár
2. Katalin Pálinger
3. Ibolya Mehlmann
4. Ildikó Pádár
5. Erika Kirsner
6. Helga Németh
7. Hortenzia Szrnka
8. Anita Görbicz
9. Krisztina Pigniczki
10. Ágnes Farkas
11. Beatrix Balogh
12. Eszter Siti
13. Tímea Tóth
14. Anita Kulcsár
15. Zsuzsanna Lovász
16. Orsolya Vérten

== Netherlands ==
1. Joke Nynke Tienstra
2. Ingeborg Vlietstra
3. Diane Ordelmans-Roelofsen
4. Monique Feijen
5. Ana Razdorov
6. Maria Turnhout
7. Martine Hekman
8. Andrea Groot
9. Diane Lamein
10. Natasaja Burgers
11. Olga Anne Maria Assink
12. Irina Pusic
13. Sylvia Hofman
14. Pearl Chantal Van der Wissel
15. Saskia Roukema
16. Marieke van der Wal

== Norway ==
1. Heidi Tjugum
2. Mimi Kopperud Slevigen
3. Tonje Larsen
4. Katja Nyberg
5. Else-Marthe Sørlie Lybekk
6. Monica Sandve
7. Mia Hundvin
8. Gro Hammerseng
9. Janne Tuven
10. Birgitte Sættem
11. Elisabeth Hilmo
12. Katrine Lunde
13. Anette Hovind Johansen
14. Vigdis Hårsaker
15. Lina Olsson Rosenberg
16. Kari-Anne Henriksen

== Romania ==
1. Ildiko Kerekes Barbu
2. Luminita Hutupan Dinu
3. Carmen Liliana Nitescu
4. Gabriela Doina Hobjila Tanase
5. Carmen Andreea Amariei
6. Ionela Goran
7. Anna Maria Lazer
8. Aurelia Bradeanu
9. Alina Nicoleta Dobrin
10. Cristina Georgiana Varzaru
11. Steluta Luca
12. Petronica Maria Fedorneac
13. Aurica Valeria Bese
14. Nicoleta Cristina Gisca
15. Valeria Motogna

== Russia ==
1. Maria Sidorova
2. Svetlana Bogdanova
3. Natalia Shipilova
4. Elena Tschaoussova
5. Oksana Romenskaya
6. Liudmila Bodnieva
7. Nadezda Muravyeva
8. Anna Ignattchenko
9. Emiliya Turey
10. Maria Koltchina
11. Irina Poltoratskaya
12. Anna Kurepta
13. Marina Naukovich
14. Oxana Pal
15. Tatiana Dyadetchenko

== Slovenia ==
1. Sergeja Stefanisin
2. Barbara Gorski
3. Olga Ceckova
4. Branka Mijatovic
5. Mihaela Ciora
6. Deja Doler
7. Silvana Ilic
8. Vesna Vincic-Pus
9. Spela Cerar
10. Tanja Dajcman
11. Nadija Plesko
12. Mira Vincic
13. Tatjana Oder
14. Anja Freser
15. Nada Tunjic
16. Katja Kurent Tatarovac

== Spain ==
1. Maria Eugenia Sanchez Bravo
2. Aitziber Elejaga Vargas
3. Elisabet Lopez Valledor
4. Noelia Oncina Morena
5. Susana Pareja Ibarra
6. Diana Box Alonso
7. Montserrat Puche Diaz
8. Marta Elisabet Mangue Gonzales
9. Lidia Sanchez Alias
10. Susana Fraile Celaya
11. Isabel Maria Ortuno Torrico
12. Maria Teresa Andreu Rodriguez
13. Cristina Esmeralda Lopez Quiros
14. Cristina Gomez Arquer
15. Veronica Maria Cuadrado Dehesa
16. Patricia Alonso Jimenez

== Sweden ==
1. Jenny Holmgren
2. Madelene Grundström
3. Veronica Isaksson
4. Kristina Linea Flognman
5. Matilda Linnea Boson
6. Anna Ljungdahl Rapp
7. Jennie Florin
8. Theresa Claesson-Andreasson
9. Helena Andersson
10. Erika Nilsson
11. Lina Möller
12. Madelene Olsson
13. Sara Eriksson
14. Asa Elisabeth Eriksson
15. Theresa Utkovic

== Ukraine ==
1. Nataliya Borysenko
2. Irina Hontcharova
3. Svitlana Morozova
4. Natasa Kotenko
5. Oksana Sakada
6. Maryna Vergelyuk
7. Olena Iatsenko
8. Ganna Syukalo
9. Natalia Horova
10. Oksana Raykhel
11. Vita Lutkova
12. Olena Reznir
13. Tetyana Nykytenko
14. Nataliya Martynienko
15. Larysa Kharlanyuk
16. Liliya Stolpakova

== Yugoslavia ==
1. Zlatka Paplacko
2. Branka Jovanovic
3. Tatjana Medved
4. Sanja Jovovic
5. Dragana Lakovic
6. Ljiljana Knezevic
7. Biljana Balac
8. Marina Rokic
9. Snezana Damjanac
10. Maja Savic
11. Aida Selmanovic
12. Bojana Petrovic
13. Tanja Milanovic
14. Dragica Milickovic
15. Dragica Djuric
16. Zoranca Stefanovic
