= France at the 2004 Summer Olympics =

- IOC code: FRA
- NOC: French National Olympic and Sports Committee
- Website: www.franceolympique.com (in French)

in Athens
- Competitors: 308 (195 men and 113 women) in 25 sports
- Flag bearer: Jackson Richardson
- Medals Ranked 7th: Gold 11 Silver 9 Bronze 13 Total 33

Summer Olympics appearances (overview)
- 1896; 1900; ~~1904~~; 1908; 1912; 1920; 1924; 1928; 1932; 1936; 1948; 1952; 1956; 1960; 1964; 1968; 1972; 1976; 1980; 1984; 1988; 1992; 1996; 2000; 2004; 2008; 2012; 2016; 2020; 2024; 2028

Other related appearances
- 1906 Intercalated Games

France competed at the 2004 Summer Olympics in Athens, Greece, from 13 to 29 August 2004. French athletes have competed in every Summer Olympic Games of the modern era. The French Olympic Committee sent a total of 308 athletes to the Games, 195 men and 113 women, to compete in 25 sports.

== Medalists ==
Medal	Name	Sport	Event	Date
Gold	Laure Manaudou	Swimming	Women's 400 m freestyle	August 15
Gold	Brice Guyart	Fencing	Men's individual foil	August 16
Gold	Tony Estanguet	Canoeing	Men's slalom C-1	August 18
Gold	Arnaud Boiteau; Didier Courrèges; Cédric Lyard; Jean Teulère; Nicolas Touzaint	Equestrian	Team eventing	August 18
Gold	Julien Pillet; Damien Touya; Gaël Touya	Fencing	Men's team sabre	August 19
Gold	Benoît Peschier	Canoeing	Men's slalom K-1	August 20
Gold	Adrien Hardy; Sébastien Vieilledent	Rowing	Men's double sculls	August 21
Gold	Érik Boisse; Fabrice Jeannet; Jérôme Jeannet; Hugues Obry	Fencing	Men's team épée	August 22
Gold	Émilie Le Pennec	Gymnastics	Women's uneven bars	August 22
Gold	Faustine Merret	Sailing	Women's sailboard	August 25
Gold	Julien Absalon	Cycling	Men's cross-country	August 28
Silver	Frédérique Jossinet	Judo	Women's 48 kg	August 14
Silver	Laura Flessel-Colovic	Fencing	Women's individual épée	August 15
Silver	Arnaud Tournant	Cycling	Men's track time trial	August 20
Silver	Laure Manaudou	Swimming	Women's 800 m freestyle	August 20
Silver	Malia Metella	Swimming	Women's 50 m freestyle	August 21
Silver	Amélie Mauresmo	Tennis	Women's singles	August 21
Silver	Frédéric Dufour; Pascal Touron	Rowing	Men's lightweight double sculls	August 22
Silver	Myriam Baverel	Taekwondo	Women's +67 kg	August 28
Silver	Jérôme Thomas	Boxing	Flyweight	August 29
Bronze	Maureen Nisima	Fencing	Women's individual épée	August 15
Bronze	Hugues Duboscq	Swimming	Men's 100 m breaststroke	August 15
Bronze	Laure Manaudou	Swimming	Women's 100 m backstroke	August 16
Bronze	Solenne Figuès	Swimming	Women's 200 m freestyle	August 17
Bronze	Fabien Lefèvre	Canoeing	Men's slalom K-1	August 20
Bronze	Sarah Daninthe; Laura Flessel-Colovic; Hajnalka Kiraly-Picot; Maureen Nisima	Fencing	Women's team épée	August 20
Bronze	Mickaël Bourgain; Laurent Gané; Arnaud Tournant	Cycling	Men's team sprint	August 21
Bronze	Anna Gomis	Wrestling	Women's freestyle 55 kg	August 23
Bronze	Lise Legrand	Wrestling	Women's freestyle 63 kg	August 23
Bronze	Naman Keïta	Athletics	Men's 400 m hurdles	August 26
Bronze	Christine Arron; Sylviane Félix; Muriel Hurtis; Véronique Mang	Athletics	Women's 4 × 100 m relay	August 26
Bronze	Pascal Rambeau; Xavier Rohart	Sailing	Star class	August 28
Bronze	Pascal Gentil	Taekwondo	Men's +80 kg	August 28

Medals by sport
Sport	1st place, gold medalist(s)	2nd place, silver medalist(s)	3rd place, bronze medalist(s)	Total
Fencing	3	1	2	6
Canoeing	2	0	1	3
Swimming	1	2	3	6
Cycling	1	1	1	3
Rowing	1	1	0	2
Sailing	1	0	1	2
Equestrian	1	0	0	1
Gymnastics	1	0	0	1
Taekwondo	0	1	1	2
Boxing	0	1	0	1
Judo	0	1	0	1
Tennis	0	1	0	1
Athletics	0	0	2	2
Wrestling	0	0	2	1
Total	11	9	13	33

== Archery ==
France has qualified three archers each in the men's and women's team.

Men

Athlete	Event	Ranking round		Round of 64	Round of 32	Round of 16	Quarterfinals	Semifinals	Final / BM	
Athlete	Event	Score	Seed	Opposition Score	Opposition Score	Opposition Score	Opposition Score	Opposition Score	Opposition Score	Rank
Jocelyn de Grandis	Individual	663	13	Peljor (BHU); L 136–161	did not advance					
Franck Fisseux	Individual	622	56	Yamamoto (JPN); L 147–155	did not advance					
Thomas Naglieri	Individual	626	53	Cuddihy (AUS); L 127–148	did not advance					
Jocelyn de Grandis; Franck Fisseux; Thomas Naglieri	Team	1911	12	—N/a		Japan; L 241–254	did not advance			

Women

Athlete	Event	Ranking round		Round of 64	Round of 32	Round of 16	Quarterfinals	Semifinals	Final / BM	
Athlete	Event	Score	Seed	Opposition Score	Opposition Score	Opposition Score	Opposition Score	Opposition Score	Opposition Score	Rank
Alexandra Fouace	Individual	627	30	Matsushita (JPN); L 157–165	did not advance					
Bérengère Schuh	Individual	626	31	Romantzi (GRE); L 143–151	did not advance					
Aurore Trayan	Individual	594	60	Zhang Jj (CHN); L 122–135	did not advance					
Alexandra Fouace; Bérengère Schuh; Aurore Trayan	Team	1847	13	—N/a		Poland; W 226–224	India; W 228–227	South Korea; L 234–249	Chinese Taipei; L 228–242	4

== Athletics ==
French athletes have so far achieved qualifying standards in the following athletics events (up to a maximum of 3 athletes in each event at the 'A' Standard, and 1 at the 'B' Standard).

Key

- Note–Ranks given for track events are within the athlete's heat only
- Q = Qualified for the next round
- q = Qualified for the next round as a fastest loser or, in field events, by position without achieving the qualifying target
- NR = National record
- N/A = Round not applicable for the event
- Bye = Athlete not required to compete in round

Men
Track & road events

Athlete	Event	Heat		Quarterfinal		Semifinal		Final	
Athlete	Event	Result	Rank	Result	Rank	Result	Rank	Result	Rank
Nicolas Aissat	800 m	1:45.31	4 q	—N/a		1:47.14	5	Did not advance	
Mehdi Baala	1500 m	3:46.06	13	—N/a		Did not advance			
David Boulanger	50 km walk	—N/a						4:01:32	22
Eddy de Lépine	100 m	10.27	5 q	DNS		Did not advance			
Leslie Djhone	400 m	45.40	1 Q	—N/a		45.01	3 q	44.94	7
Ladji Doucouré	110 m hurdles	13.18 NR	1 Q	13.23	1 Q	13.06 NR	1 Q	13.76	8
Driss El Himer	Marathon	—N/a						2:29:07	68
Naman Keïta	400 m hurdles	48.88	2 Q	—N/a		48.24	3 q	48.26	3rd place, bronze medalist(s)
Florent Lacasse	800 m	1:46.91	3	—N/a		Did not advance			
El Hassan Lahssini	Marathon	—N/a						2:19:50	36
Denis Langlois	50 km walk	—N/a						DNF	
Vincent Le Dauphin	3000 m steeplechase	8:20.13	5 q	—N/a				8:16.15	10
Issa-Aimé Nthépé	100 m	10.67	5	Did not advance					
Ronald Pognon	100 m	10.18	2 Q	10.15	4 q	10.32	7	Did not advance	
Eddy Riva	50 km walk	—N/a						4:00:25	21
Ismaïl Sghyr	10000 m	—N/a						27:57.09	8
Bouabdellah Tahri	3000 m steeplechase	8:18.98	3 Q	—N/a				8:14.26	7
Mounir Yemmouni	1500 m	3:51.08	10	—N/a		Did not advance			
David Alerte; Frédéric Krantz; Issa-Aimé Nthépé; Ronald Pognon	4 × 100 m relay	38.93	7	—N/a				Did not advance	
Leslie Djhone; Ahmed Douhou; Abderrahim El Haouzy; Ibrahima Wade	4 × 400 m relay	3:04.39	7	—N/a				Did not advance	

Field events

Athlete	Event	Qualification		Final	
Athlete	Event	Distance	Position	Distance	Position
David Brisseault	Javelin throw	71.86	31	Did not advance	
Yann Domenech	Long jump	7.73	28	Did not advance	
Kafétien Gomis	Long jump	7.99	14	Did not advance	
Nicolas Guigon	Pole vault	5.30	=31	Did not advance	
Julien Kapek	Triple jump	16.91	12 q	16.81	10
Romain Mesnil	Pole vault	5.65	18	Did not advance	
Salim Sdiri	Long jump	8.08	9 q	7.94	12
Karl Taillepierre	Triple jump	15.50	42	Did not advance	

Combined events – Decathlon

Athlete	Event	100 m	LJ	SP	HJ	400 m	110H	DT	PV	JT	1500 m	Final	Rank
Romain Barras	Result	11.14	6.99	14.91	1.94	49.41	14.37	44.83	4.60	64.55	4:27.09	8067	13
Romain Barras	Points	830	811	784	749	842	927	763	790	807	764	8067	13
Laurent Hernu	Result	10.97	7.19	14.65	2.03	48.73	14.25	44.72	4.80	57.76	4:24.35	8237	7
Laurent Hernu	Points	867	859	768	831	874	942	761	849	704	782	8237	7

Women
Track & road events

Athlete	Event	Heat		Quarterfinal		Semifinal		Final	
Athlete	Event	Result	Rank	Result	Rank	Result	Rank	Result	Rank
Christine Arron	100 m	11.14	2 Q	11.10	1 Q	11.21	6	Did not advance	
Christine Arron	200 m	22.60	2 Q	22.90	4 q	23.05	7	Did not advance	
Hind Dehiba	1500 m	4:07.96	8	—N/a		Did not advance			
Latifa Essarokh	1500 m	4:09.08	10	—N/a		Did not advance			
Sylviane Félix	200 m	22.94	2 Q	23.08	5 q	22.99	7	Did not advance	
Linda Ferga-Khodadin	100 m hurdles	13.02	4	—N/a		Did not advance			
Reïna-Flor Okori	100 m hurdles	12.81	1 Q	—N/a		12.81	6	Did not advance	
Hafida Gadi	Marathon	—N/a						2:50:29	52
Élisabeth Grousselle	800 m	2:00.31	3 Q	—N/a		2:00.21	6	Did not advance	
Muriel Hurtis	200 m	22.77	4 Q	23.33	6	Did not advance			
Véronique Mang	100 m	11.24	2 Q	11.39	6	Did not advance			
Rakiya Maraoui-Quétier	Marathon	—N/a						DNF	
Maria Martins	1500 m	4:05.95	4 Q	—N/a		4:12.76	12	Did not advance	
Margaret Maury	5000 m	14:56.79	6 q	—N/a				15:09.77	11
Nicole Ramalalanirina	100 m hurdles	13.07	4	—N/a		Did not advance			
Corinne Raux	Marathon	—N/a						2:35:54	15
Christine Arron; Sylviane Félix; Muriel Hurtis; Véronique Mang	4 × 100 m relay	42.98	3 Q	—N/a				42.54	3rd place, bronze medalist(s)

Field events

Athlete	Event	Qualification		Final	
Athlete	Event	Distance	Position	Distance	Position
Eunice Barber	Long jump	6.37	29	Did not advance	
Vanessa Boslak	Pole vault	4.40	11 q	4.40	6
Laurence Manfredi	Shot put	17.78	16	Did not advance	
Manuela Montebrun	Hammer throw	67.90	15	Did not advance	
Marie Poissonnier	Pole vault	4.00	34	Did not advance	
Mélina Robert-Michon	Discus throw	56.70	31	Did not advance	

Combined events – Heptathlon

Athlete	Event	100H	HJ	SP	200 m	LJ	JT	800 m	Final	Rank
Marie Collonvillé	Result	13.65	1.85	12.35	25.26	6.19	49.14	2:13.62	6279	7
Marie Collonvillé	Points	1028	1041	684	863	908	843	912	6279	7

== Badminton ==
Athlete	Event	Round of 32	Round of 16	Quarterfinal	Semifinal	Final / BM	
Athlete	Event	Opposition Score	Opposition Score	Opposition Score	Opposition Score	Opposition Score	Rank
Pi Hongyan	Women's singles	Seo Y-H (KOR); L 6–11, 11–6, 7–11	Did not advance				
Svetoslav Stoyanov; Victoria Wright	Mixed doubles	Eriksen / Schjoldager (DEN); L 13–15, 15–2, 5–15	Did not advance				

== Boxing ==
France sent six boxers to Athens, mostly in the lighter weight classes. They won a silver medal. Two lost their first bouts, as the team combined for a record of 8–6. France was part of a four-way tie for 8th place in the boxing medals scoreboard.

Athlete	Event	Round of 32	Round of 16	Quarterfinals	Semifinals	Final	
Athlete	Event	Opposition Result	Opposition Result	Opposition Result	Opposition Result	Opposition Result	Rank
Redouane Asloum	Light flyweight	Nalbandyan (ARM); L 20–27	Did not advance				
Jérôme Thomas	Flyweight	Kumar (IND); W 37–16	Payano (DOM); W 36–17	Siler (USA); W 23–18	Aslanov (AZE); W 23–18	Gamboa (CUB); L 23–38	2nd place, silver medalist(s)
Ali Hallab	Bantamweight	Bouziane (ALG); L 16–19	Did not advance				
Khedafi Djelkhir	Featherweight	Nejmaoui (TUN); W 38–13	Tajbert (GER); L 26–40	Did not advance			
Willy Blain	Light welterweight	Ali Sassi (TUN); W 36–14	Maletin (RUS); W 28–20	Boonjumnong (THA); L 8–20	Did not advance		
Xavier Noël	Welterweight	Berto (HAI); W 36–34	Polyakov (UKR); L 25–32	Did not advance			

== Canoeing ==
=== Slalom ===
Athlete	Event	Preliminary						Semifinal		Final			
Athlete	Event	Run 1	Rank	Run 2	Rank	Total	Rank	Time	Rank	Time	Rank	Total	Rank
Tony Estanguet	Men's C-1	99.23	1	102.30	5	201.53	2 Q	93.37	2 Q	95.79	3	189.16	1st place, gold medalist(s)
Nicolas Peschier	Men's C-1	108.74	15	112.62	14	221.36	14	Did not advance					
Fabien Lefèvre	Men's K-1	95.00	5	95.80	4	190.80	4 Q	95.13	6 Q	95.86	2	190.99	3rd place, bronze medalist(s)
Benoît Peschier	Men's K-1	99.33	14	95.04	2	194.37	8 Q	93.93	2 Q	94.03	1	187.96	1st place, gold medalist(s)
Yann Le Pennec; Philippe Quémerais	Men's C-2	105.29	3	110.04	5	215.33	4 Q	105.79	2 Q	111.00	5	216.79	5
Peggy Dickens	Women's K-1	121.31	14	108.27	2	229.58	12 Q	104.95	2 Q	113.85	7	218.80	4

=== Sprint ===
Athlete	Event	Heats		Semifinals		Final	
Athlete	Event	Time	Rank	Time	Rank	Time	Rank
Babak Amir-Tahmasseb	Men's K-1 500 m	1:39.401	3 q	1:40.467	3 Q	1:40.187	7
Babak Amir-Tahmasseb	Men's K-1 1000 m	3:36.882	6 q	3:32.582	5	Did not advance	
Yannick Lavigne; José Lenoir	Men's C-2 500 m	1:49.940	7 q	1:45.458	7	Did not advance	
Yannick Lavigne; José Lenoir	Men's C-2 1000 m	3:35.939	5 q	3:35.232	5	Did not advance	
Nathalie Marie	Women's K-1 500 m	1:57.342	5 q	1:57.944	5	Did not advance	
Marie Delattre; Anne-Laure Viard	Women's K-2 500 m	1:45.090	5 q	1:45.626	4	Did not advance	

Qualification Legend: Q = Qualify to final; q = Qualify to semifinal

== Cycling ==
=== Road ===
Men

Athlete	Event	Time	Rank
Laurent Brochard	Road race	5:44:13	44
Sylvain Chavanel	Road race	Did not finish	
Christophe Moreau	Road race	Did not finish	
Christophe Moreau	Time trial	59:50.28	11
Richard Virenque	Road race	5:44:13	48
Thomas Voeckler	Road race	5:41:56	20

Women

Athlete	Event	Time	Rank
Sonia Huguet	Road race	3:30:30	40
Jeannie Longo-Ciprelli	Road race	3:25:23	10
Jeannie Longo-Ciprelli	Time trial	33:05.72	14
Edwige Pitel	Road race	3:28:39	32
Edwige Pitel	Time trial	34:02.35	20

=== Track ===
Sprint

Athlete	Event	Qualification		Round 1	Repechage 1	Round 2	Repechage 2	Quarterfinals	Semifinals	Final	
Athlete	Event	Time Speed (km/h)	Rank	Opposition Time Speed (km/h)	Opposition Time Speed (km/h)	Opposition Time Speed (km/h)	Opposition Time Speed (km/h)	Opposition Time Speed (km/h)	Opposition Time Speed (km/h)	Opposition Time Speed (km/h)	Rank
Mickaël Bourgain	Men's sprint	10.264; 70.148	4	Jeřábek (SVK); W 10.988; 65.526	Bye	Eadie (AUS); W 10.936; 65.837	Bye	Gané (FRA); L, L	Did not advance	5th place final Edgar (GBR); Forde (BAR); Zieliński (POL); L	8
Laurent Gané	Men's sprint	10.271; 70.100	5	Kim C-B (KOR); W 11.166; 64.481	Bye	Villanueva (ESP); W 10.772; 66.839	Bye	Bourgain (FRA); W 11.018, W 10.876	Bayley (AUS); L, L	Wolff (GER); L, L	4
Mickaël Bourgain; Laurent Gané; Arnaud Tournant	Men's team sprint	44.179; 61.115	1 Q	Greece; W 44.128; 61.185	—N/a					Australia; W 44.359; 60.867	3rd place, bronze medalist(s)

Pursuit

Athlete	Event	Qualification		Semifinals		Final	
Athlete	Event	Time	Rank	Opponent Results	Rank	Opponent Results	Rank
Fabien Sanchez	Men's individual pursuit	4:20.606	8 Q	Wiggins (GBR); L 4:21.235	6	Did not advance	
Mathieu Ladagnous; Anthony Langella; Jérôme Neuville; Fabien Sanchez	Men's team pursuit	4:07.336	7 Q	Great Britain; LAP	7	Did not advance	

Time trial

Athlete	Event	Time	Rank
Arnaud Tournant	Men's time trial	1:00.896	2nd place, silver medalist(s)
François Pervis	Men's time trial	1:02.328	6

Keirin

Athlete	Event	1st round	Repechage	2nd round	Final
Athlete	Event	Rank	Rank	Rank	Rank
Mickaël Bourgain	Men's keirin	7 R	1 Q	3 Q	4
Laurent Gané	Men's keirin	6 R	6	Did not advance	

Omnium

Athlete	Event	Points	Laps	Rank
Franck Perque	Men's points race	43	2	10
Sonia Huguet	Women's points race	2	0	13
Mathieu Ladagnous; Jérôme Neuville	Men's madison	Did not finish		

=== Mountain biking ===
Athlete	Event	Time	Rank
Julien Absalon	Men's cross-country	2:15:02	1st place, gold medalist(s)
Miguel Martinez	Men's cross-country	Did not finish	
Jean-Christophe Péraud	Men's cross-country	2:20:59	11
Laurence Leboucher	Women's cross-country	2:05:34	8

== Diving ==
France has qualified a single diver.

Women

Athlete	Event	Preliminaries		Semifinals		Final	
Athlete	Event	Points	Rank	Points	Rank	Points	Rank
Claire Febvay	10 m platform	195.06	33	Did not advance			

== Equestrian ==
France has qualified two riders in dressage, and a spot for the team each in eventing and show jumping. The team of Arnaud Boiteau, Didier Courrèges, Cédric Lyard, Jean Teulère and Nicolas Touzaint captured the gold medal in team eventing after winning an appeal against an earlier decision imposed by the FEI Ground Jury, that gave German rider Bettina Hoy and her team a triumphant gold medal double.

=== Dressage ===
Athlete	Horse	Event	Grand Prix		Grand Prix Special		Grand Prix Freestyle		Overall	
Athlete	Horse	Event	Score	Rank	Score	Rank	Score	Rank	Score	Rank
Julia Chevanne Gimel	Calimucho	Individual	68.750	19 Q	70.560	16	Did not advance			
Karen Tebar	Falada M	Individual	67.958	24 Q	67.440	21	Did not advance			

=== Eventing ===
Athlete	Horse	Event	Dressage		Cross-country			Jumping						Total	
Athlete	Horse	Event	Dressage		Cross-country			Qualifier			Final			Total	
Athlete	Horse	Event	Penalties	Rank	Penalties	Total	Rank	Penalties	Total	Rank	Penalties	Total	Rank	Penalties	Rank
Arnaud Boiteau	Expo du Moulin	Individual	45.80 #	21	Eliminated			Did not advance							
Didier Courrèges	Debat d'Estruval	Individual	45.60	20	0.00	45.60	14	15.00 #	60.60	20 Q	45.00	105.60	25	105.60	25
Cédric Lyard	Fine Mervielle	Individual	54.40 #	34	3.20 #	57.60 #	26	13.00	70.60 #	28	Did not advance			70.60	28
Jean Teulère	Espoir de la Mare	Individual	38.40	6	0.00	38.40	4	8.00	46.40	6 Q	4.00	50.40	4	50.40	4
Nicolas Touzaint	Galan de Sauvagere	Individual	29.40	1	0.00	29.40	1	4.00	33.40	1 Q	19	52.40	8	52.40	8
Arnaud Boiteau; Didier Courrèges; Cédric Lyard; Jean Teulère; Nicolas Touzaint	See above	Team	113.40	2	0.00	113.40	=1	25.00	140.40	9	—N/a			140.40	1st place, gold medalist(s)

"#" indicates that the score of this rider does not count in the team competition, since only the best three results of a team are counted.

=== Show jumping ===
Athlete	Horse	Event	Qualification								Final					Total	
Athlete	Horse	Event	Round 1		Round 2			Round 3			Round A		Round B			Total	
Athlete	Horse	Event	Penalties	Rank	Penalties	Total	Rank	Penalties	Total	Rank	Penalties	Rank	Penalties	Total	Rank	Penalties	Rank
Eugenie Angot	Cigale du Taillis	Individual	6	42	4	10	27 Q	1	11	12 Q	16	=36	Did not advance			16	=36
Florian Angot	First de Launay	Individual	4	=19	4	8	=16 Q	9	17	=21 Q	20	=40	Did not advance			20	=40
Bruno Broucqsault	Dileme de Cephe	Individual	4	=19	Retired			Did not advance									
Eric Navet	Dollar du Murier	Individual	5	=31	16	21	=48 Q	Retired			Did not advance						
Eugenie Angot; Florian Angot; Bruno Broucqsault; Eric Navet	See above	Team	—N/a								24	10	Did not advance				

== Fencing ==
Men

Athlete	Event	Round of 64	Round of 32	Round of 16	Quarterfinal	Semifinal	Final / BM	
Athlete	Event	Opposition Score	Opposition Score	Opposition Score	Opposition Score	Opposition Score	Opposition Score	Rank
Érik Boisse	Individual épée	Bye	Rathprasert (THA); W 15–9	Carillo (CUB); W 15–11	Jeannet (FRA); W 15–14	Fischer (SUI); L 9–15	Kolobkov (RUS); L 8–15	4
Fabrice Jeannet	Individual épée	Bye	Kochetkov (RUS); W 15–11	Lee (KOR); W 15–5	Boisse (FRA); L 14–15	Did not advance		
Hugues Obry	Individual épée	Bye	Carillo (CUB); L 10–15	Did not advance				
Érik Boisse; Fabrice Jeannet; Jérôme Jeannet; Hugues Obry	Team épée	—N/a			United States; W 45–32	Germany; W 45–44	Hungary; W 43–32	1st place, gold medalist(s)
Loïc Attely	Individual foil	Bye	Schlosser (AUT); W 15–14	Guyart (FRA); L 4–15	Did not advance			
Brice Guyart	Individual foil	Bye	El Azizi (ALG); W 15–3	Attely (FRA); W 15–4	Joppich (GER); W 15–12	Cassarà (ITA); W 15–14	Sanzo (ITA); W 15–13	1st place, gold medalist(s)
Erwann Le Péchoux	Individual foil	Bye	Dong Zz (CHN); W 15-9	Vanni (ITA); L 8-15	Did not advance			
Loïc Attely; Brice Guyart; Erwann Le Péchoux; Jean-Noël Ferrari	Team foil	—N/a			Russia; L 38–45	Classification semi-final Egypt; W 45–32	5th place final Germany; W 45–38	5
Julien Pillet	Individual sabre	Bye	Oh E-S (KOR); W 15–13	Sharikov (RUS); L 11–15	Did not advance			
Damien Touya	Individual sabre	Bye	Sznajder (POL); L 14–15	Did not advance				
Gaël Touya	Individual sabre	Bye	Smart (USA); L 11–15	Did not advance				
Julien Pillet; Damien Touya; Gaël Touya	Team sabre	—N/a			China; W 45–35	United States; W 45–44	Italy; W 45–42	1st place, gold medalist(s)

Women

Athlete	Event	Round of 64	Round of 32	Round of 16	Quarterfinal	Semifinal	Final / BM	
Athlete	Event	Opposition Score	Opposition Score	Opposition Score	Opposition Score	Opposition Score	Opposition Score	Rank
Laura Flessel-Colovic	Individual épée	Bye	Gómez (CUB); W 15–9	Kiraly-Picot (FRA); W 15–9	Hristou (GRE); W 15–13	Mincza-Nébald (HUN); W 15–14	Nagy (HUN); L 10–15	2nd place, silver medalist(s)
Hajnalka Kiraly-Picot	Individual épée	Bye	Shen Ww (CHN); W 11–7	Flessel-Colovic (FRA); L 9–15	Did not advance			
Maureen Nisima	Individual épée	Bye	Magkandaki (GRE); W 6-5	Halls (AUS); W 15–10	Duplitzer (GER); W 15–14	Nagy (HUN); L 14–15	Mincza-Nébald (HUN); W 15–12	3rd place, bronze medalist(s)
Laura Flessel-Colovic; Hajnalka Kiraly-Picot; Maureen Nisima	Team épée	—N/a			China; W 45–33	Germany; L 32–33	Canada; W 45–37	3rd place, bronze medalist(s)
Adeline Wuillème	Individual foil	—N/a	Silchenko (BLR); W 15–4	Granbassi (ITA); W 15–9	Vezzali (ITA); L 8–15	Did not advance		
Cécile Argiolas	Individual sabre	—N/a	Nedeshkowskaia (UKR); W 15–9	Tan X (CHN); L 11–15	Did not advance			
Léonore Perrus	Individual sabre	—N/a	Bye	E Jacobson (USA); W 15–13	S Jacobson (USA); L 11–15	Did not advance		
Anne-Lise Touya	Individual sabre	—N/a	Bye	Zhang Y (CHN); L 12–15	Did not advance			

== Gymnastics ==
=== Artistic ===
Men
Team

Athlete	Event	Qualification								Final							
Athlete	Event	Apparatus						Total	Rank	Apparatus						Total	Rank
Athlete	Event	F	PH	R	V	PB	HB	Total	Rank	F	PH	R	V	PB	HB	Total	Rank
Pierre-Yves Bény	Team	8.837	9.475	9.750 Q	9.250	—N/a				Did not advance							
Benoît Caranobe	Team	9.287	9.162	9.587	9.612	9.450	9.537	56.635	15 Q	Did not advance							
Yann Cucherat	Team	—N/a	9.512	8.912	—N/a	9.750 Q	9.700	—N/a		Did not advance							
Dimitri Karbanenko	Team	9.612	8.375	9.012	9.475	8.550	9.537	54.561	39	Did not advance							
Florent Marée	Team	9.212	—N/a	9.387	9.375	9.150	9.687	—N/a		Did not advance							
Johan Mounard	Team	8.525	9.050	—N/a	9.187	9.725	9.637	—N/a		Did not advance							
Total	Team	36.948	37.199	37.736	37.712	38.075	38.561	226.231	9	Did not advance							

Individual finals

Athlete	Event	Apparatus						Total	Rank
Athlete	Event	F	PH	R	V	PB	HB	Total	Rank
Pierre-Yves Bény	Rings	—N/a		9.800	—N/a			9.800	=5
Benoît Caranobe	All-around	9.112	9.400	9.575	9.187	9.087	9.612	55.973	17
Yann Cucherat	Parallel bars	—N/a				9.762	—N/a	9.762	6

Women
Team

Athlete	Event	Qualification						Final					
Athlete	Event	Apparatus				Total	Rank	Apparatus				Total	Rank
Athlete	Event	V	UB	BB	F	Total	Rank	V	UB	BB	F	Total	Rank
Coralie Chacon	Team	9.450 Q	—N/a	8.650	9.062	—N/a		9.462	—N/a				
Soraya Chaouch	Team	9.125	9.550	8.962	8.200	35.837	39	—N/a	8.937	—N/a	8.987	—N/a	
Marine Debauve	Team	9.150	9.500	9.425	9.362	37.437	11 Q	—N/a	9.437	9.400	9.350	—N/a	
Émilie Le Pennec	Team	9.325	9.662 Q	8.900	9.425	37.312	12 Q	9.325	8.637	8.850	9.112	—N/a	
Camille Schmutz	Team	—N/a	9.337	9.137	—N/a			—N/a		9.287	—N/a		
Isabelle Severino	Team	9.337	9.137	—N/a	9.175	—N/a		9.375	—N/a				
Total	Team	37.262	38.049	36.424	37.024	148.759	6 Q	28.162	27.011	27.537	27.449	110.157	6

Individual finals

Athlete	Event	Apparatus				Total	Rank
Athlete	Event	V	UB	BB	F	Total	Rank
Coralie Chacon	Vault	4.456	—N/a			4.456	8
Marine Debauve	All-around	9.162	9.512	9.262	9.425	37.361	7
Émilie Le Pennec	All-around	9.300	9.687	8.112	9.537	36.636	14
Émilie Le Pennec	Uneven bars	—N/a	9.687	—N/a		9.687	1st place, gold medalist(s)

=== Trampoline ===
Athlete	Event	Qualification		Final	
Athlete	Event	Score	Rank	Score	Rank
David Martin	Men's	67.40	6 Q	39.90	8

== Handball ==
=== Men's tournament ===
Roster

The following is the France roster in the men's handball tournament of the 2004 Summer Olympics.

Head coach: Claude Onesta

No.	Pos.	Name	Date of birth (age)	Height	App.	Goals	Club
1	GK	Yohann Ploquin	31 May 1978 (aged 26)	1.90 m	36	/	(France) Toulouse Handball
2	LB	Jérôme Fernandez	7 March 1977 (aged 27)	1.99 m	161	666	(Spain) FC Barcelona
3	P/DEF	Didier Dinart	18 January 1977 (aged 27)	1.97 m	182	85	(Spain) BM Ciudad Real
4	RB	Cédric Burdet	15 November 1974 (aged 29)	1.95 m	153	366	(Germany) VfL Gummersbach
5	CB	Guillaume Gille	12 July 1976 (aged 28)	1.92 m	151	449	(Germany) HSV Hamburg
6	P	Bertrand Gille	24 March 1978 (aged 26)	1.87 m	142	427	(Germany) HSV Hamburg
7	P	Guéric Kervadec	9 January 1972 (aged 32)	1.98 m	191	476	(France) US Creteil
8	LB	Daniel Narcisse	16 December 1979 (aged 24)	1.89 m	74	200	(France) Chambéry Savoie HB
9	RW	Grégory Anquetil	14 December 1970 (aged 33)	1.78 m	144	377	(France) Montpellier HB
11	LW	Olivier Girault	22 February 1973 (aged 31)	1.83 m	146	285	(France) Paris Handball
13	LB	Nikola Karabatić	11 April 1984 (aged 20)	1.95 m	29	130	(France) Montpellier HB
16	GK	Thierry Omeyer	2 November 1976 (aged 27)	1.92 m	91	/	(France) Montpellier HB
17	CB	Jackson Richardson	16 June 1969 (aged 35)	1.86 m	389	752	(Spain) Portland San Antonio
18	RW	Joël Abati	25 April 1971 (aged 33)	1.90 m	107	276	(Germany) SC Magdeburg
21	LW	Michaël Guigou	28 January 1982 (aged 22)	1.79 m	16	42	(France) Montpellier HB

Group play

Pos	Team	Pld	W	D	L	GF	GA	GD	Pts	Qualification
1	France	5	5	0	0	135	108	+27	10	Quarterfinals
2	Hungary	5	4	0	1	132	124	+8	8	Quarterfinals
3	Germany	5	3	0	2	139	110	+29	6	Quarterfinals
4	Greece (H)	5	2	0	3	117	130	−13	4	Quarterfinals
5	Brazil	5	1	0	4	105	133	−28	2	
6	Egypt	5	0	0	5	110	133	−23	0	

Rules for classification: 1) Points; 2) Head-to-head points; 3) Head-to-head goal difference; 4) Head-to-head goals scored; 5) Goal difference; 6) Goals scored; 7) Draw.
(H) Hosts

14 August 2004; 21:30	France	31 – 17	Brazil	Sports Pavilion, Athens; Referees: Arnaldsson, Vidarsson (ISL)
14 August 2004; 21:30	Anquetil 7	(14-10)	Silva 6	Sports Pavilion, Athens; Referees: Arnaldsson, Vidarsson (ISL)
14 August 2004; 21:30	3× (yellow card) 4× (suspension)		2× (yellow card) 6× (suspension)	Sports Pavilion, Athens; Referees: Arnaldsson, Vidarsson (ISL)

16 August 2004; 16:30	Greece	25 – 29	France	Sports Pavilion, Athens; Referees: Boye, Jensen (DEN)
16 August 2004; 16:30	Karypidis 7	(15-15)	Anquetil 9	Sports Pavilion, Athens; Referees: Boye, Jensen (DEN)
16 August 2004; 16:30	4× (yellow card) 9× (suspension)		3× (yellow card) 4× (suspension)	Sports Pavilion, Athens; Referees: Boye, Jensen (DEN)

18 August 2004; 14:30	France	26 – 23	Hungary	Sports Pavilion, Athens; Referees: Hansson, Olsson (SWE)
18 August 2004; 14:30	Guigou 6	(9-10)	Pérez 10	Sports Pavilion, Athens; Referees: Hansson, Olsson (SWE)
18 August 2004; 14:30	4× (yellow card) 9× (suspension)		3× (yellow card) 4× (suspension)	Sports Pavilion, Athens; Referees: Hansson, Olsson (SWE)

20 August 2004; 21:30	France	22 – 21	Egypt	Sports Pavilion, Athens; Referees: Breto, Huelin Trillo (ESP)
20 August 2004; 21:30	Girault 8	(11-13)	Keshk 6	Sports Pavilion, Athens; Referees: Breto, Huelin Trillo (ESP)
20 August 2004; 21:30	3× (yellow card) 5× (suspension)		4× (yellow card) 8× (suspension) 1× (red card)	Sports Pavilion, Athens; Referees: Breto, Huelin Trillo (ESP)

22 August 2004; 14:30	Germany	22 – 27	France	Sports Pavilion, Athens; Referees: Oie, Togstad (NOR)
22 August 2004; 14:30	Schwarzer, Kehrmann 5	(12-11)	Fernandez 6	Sports Pavilion, Athens; Referees: Oie, Togstad (NOR)
22 August 2004; 14:30	2× (yellow card) 4× (suspension)		2× (yellow card) 4× (suspension)	Sports Pavilion, Athens; Referees: Oie, Togstad (NOR)

Quarterfinal

24 August 2004; 22:05	France	24 – 26	Russia	Sports Pavilion, Athens; Referees: Nachevski, Nachevski (MKD)
24 August 2004; 22:05	Abati 6	(14-13)	Ivanov, Kokcharov 5	Sports Pavilion, Athens; Referees: Nachevski, Nachevski (MKD)
24 August 2004; 22:05	3× (yellow card) 2× (suspension)		3× (yellow card) 3× (suspension)	Sports Pavilion, Athens; Referees: Nachevski, Nachevski (MKD)

5th-8th Classification

27 August 2004; 09:30	Spain	27 – 29	France	Helliniko Olympic Indoor Arena; Referees: Boye, Jensen (DEN)
27 August 2004; 09:30	Romero, Ortega 5	(13-11)	Burdet, Girault 8	Helliniko Olympic Indoor Arena; Referees: Boye, Jensen (DEN)
27 August 2004; 09:30	3× (yellow card) 3× (suspension)		3× (yellow card) 4× (suspension)	Helliniko Olympic Indoor Arena; Referees: Boye, Jensen (DEN)

Fifth Place Final

28 August 2004; 19:30	Greece	15 – 33	France	Helliniko Olympic Indoor Arena; Referees: Lemme, Ullrich (GER)
28 August 2004; 19:30	Grammatikos 7	(7-17)	Fernandez 9	Helliniko Olympic Indoor Arena; Referees: Lemme, Ullrich (GER)
28 August 2004; 19:30	3× (yellow card) 6× (suspension)		2× (yellow card) 3× (suspension)	Helliniko Olympic Indoor Arena; Referees: Lemme, Ullrich (GER)

=== Women's tournament ===
Roster

The following is the France roster in the women's handball tournament of the 2004 Summer Olympics.

Head coaches: Olivier Krumbholz

No.	Pos.	Name	Date of birth (age)	Height	App.	Goals	Club
1	GK	Joanne Dudziak	8 June 1972 (aged 32)	1.70 m	148	1	(France) HBC Nimes
2	LB	Isabelle Cendier Ajaguin	22 May 1977 (aged 27)	1.72 m	84	132	(France) HB Metz Métropole
3	RW	Estelle Vogein	3 April 1976 (aged 28)	1.70 m	85	132	(France) HB Metz Métropole
4	LB	Leila Lejeune	16 March 1976 (aged 28)	1.76 m	156	636	(Denmark) Viborg HK
5	CB	Sandrine Delerce	26 April 1975 (aged 29)	1.73 m	155	373	(France) ESBF Besançon
6	RB	Melinda Jacques	13 October 1971 (aged 32)	1.89 m	58	263	(France) HB Metz Métropole
7	LB	Nodjialem Myaro	5 September 1976 (aged 27)	1.82 m	141	490	(Denmark) KIF Kolding
8	P	Véronique Pecqueux-Rolland	9 October 1972 (aged 31)	1.72 m	220	651	(France) ESBF Besançon
10	CB	Sophie Herbrecht	13 February 1982 (aged 22)	1.74 m	52	98	(France) ESBF Besançon
11	RW	Stéphanie Cano	17 April 1974 (aged 30)	1.64 m	176	306	(Denmark) Slagelse FH
13	P	Isabelle Wendling	30 January 1971 (aged 33)	1.75 m	232	386	(France) HB Metz Métropole
14	LB	Myriam Korfanty	18 October 1978 (aged 25)	1.80 m	119	184	(France) US Mios
16	GK	Valérie Nicolas	12 March 1975 (aged 29)	1.78 m	174	0	(Denmark) Viborg HK
17	LW	Delphine Guehl	30 July 1978 (aged 26)	1.72 m	21	44	(France) Cercle Dijon Bourgogne
20	LW	Raphaëlle Tervel	21 April 1979 (aged 25)	1.78 m	89	161	(France) ESBF Besançon

Group play

Pos	Team	Pld	W	D	L	GF	GA	GD	Pts	Qualification
1	South Korea	4	3	1	0	135	103	+32	7 (Note: South Korea 29–29 Denmark)	Quarterfinals
2	Denmark	4	3	1	0	125	98	+27	7	Quarterfinals
3	France	4	2	0	2	105	106	−1	4	Quarterfinals
4	Spain	4	0	1	3	86	110	−24	1 (Note: Spain 24–24 Angola)	Quarterfinals
5	Angola	4	0	1	3	97	131	−34	1	

Rules for classification: 1) Points; 2) Head-to-head points; 3) Head-to-head goal difference; 4) Head-to-head goals scored; 5) Goal difference; 6) Goals scored; 7) Draw.
Notes:

15 August 2004; 21:30	Denmark	35 – 26	France	Sports Pavilion, Athens; Referees: Pozeznik, Repensek (SLO)
15 August 2004; 21:30	Brødsgaard 8	(16-11)	Cendier Ajaguin, Pecqueux-Rolland 4	Sports Pavilion, Athens; Referees: Pozeznik, Repensek (SLO)
15 August 2004; 21:30	4× (yellow card) 3× (suspension)		2× (yellow card) 3× (suspension)	Sports Pavilion, Athens; Referees: Pozeznik, Repensek (SLO)

17 August 2004; 21:30	France	27 – 20	Spain	Sports Pavilion, Athens; Referees: Lemme, Ullrich (GER)
17 August 2004; 21:30	Lejeune, Tervel 6	(13-10)	Puche 5	Sports Pavilion, Athens; Referees: Lemme, Ullrich (GER)
17 August 2004; 21:30	3× (yellow card) 4× (suspension)		3× (yellow card) 3× (suspension)	Sports Pavilion, Athens; Referees: Lemme, Ullrich (GER)

21 August 2004; 14:30	Angola	21 – 29	France	Sports Pavilion, Athens; Referees: Bavas, Migas (GRE)
21 August 2004; 14:30	Bengue 7	(6-12)	Pecqueux-Rolland 8	Sports Pavilion, Athens; Referees: Bavas, Migas (GRE)
21 August 2004; 14:30	3× (yellow card) 3× (suspension)		3× (yellow card) 4× (suspension)	Sports Pavilion, Athens; Referees: Bavas, Migas (GRE)

23 August 2004; 14:30	France	23 – 30	South Korea	Sports Pavilion, Athens; Referees: Arnaldsson, Vidarsson (ISL)
23 August 2004; 14:30	Wendling 8	(13-18)	Lim 8	Sports Pavilion, Athens; Referees: Arnaldsson, Vidarsson (ISL)
23 August 2004; 14:30	3× (yellow card) 3× (suspension)		3× (yellow card) 4× (suspension)	Sports Pavilion, Athens; Referees: Arnaldsson, Vidarsson (ISL)

Quarterfinal

26 August 2004; 16:30	France	25 – 23	Hungary	Helliniko Olympic Indoor Arena; Referees: Bavas, Migas (GRE)
26 August 2004; 16:30	Lejeune 6	(10-13)	Radulovics 6	Helliniko Olympic Indoor Arena; Referees: Bavas, Migas (GRE)
26 August 2004; 16:30	4× (yellow card) 6× (suspension)		4× (yellow card) 4× (suspension)	Helliniko Olympic Indoor Arena; Referees: Bavas, Migas (GRE)

Semifinal

27 August 2004; 19:30	France	31 – 32	South Korea	Helliniko Olympic Indoor Arena; Referees: Oie, Togstad (NOR)
27 August 2004; 19:30	Pecqueux-Rolland, Cano 6	(10-13)	Lee G 7	Helliniko Olympic Indoor Arena; Referees: Oie, Togstad (NOR)
27 August 2004; 19:30	3× (yellow card) 4× (suspension)		3× (yellow card) 3× (suspension)	Helliniko Olympic Indoor Arena; Referees: Oie, Togstad (NOR)

Bronze Medal Final

28 August 2004; 16:30	Ukraine	21 – 18	France	Helliniko Olympic Indoor Arena; Referees: Pozeznik, Repensek (SLO)
28 August 2004; 16:30	Vergelyuk 6	(10-10)	Lejeune 7	Helliniko Olympic Indoor Arena; Referees: Pozeznik, Repensek (SLO)
28 August 2004; 16:30	4× (yellow card) 8× (suspension) 1× (red card)		3× (yellow card) 2× (suspension)	Helliniko Olympic Indoor Arena; Referees: Pozeznik, Repensek (SLO)

== Judo ==
France has qualified thirteen judoka.

Men

Athlete	Event	Round of 32	Round of 16	Quarterfinals	Semifinals	Repechage 1	Repechage 2	Repechage 3	Final / BM	
Athlete	Event	Opposition Result	Opposition Result	Opposition Result	Opposition Result	Opposition Result	Opposition Result	Opposition Result	Opposition Result	Rank
Benjamin Darbelet	−60 kg	Alvarenga (VEN); W 0010–0002	Choi M-H (KOR); L 0101–0113	Did not advance						
Larbi Benboudaoud	−66 kg	Demirel (TUR); L 0021–1100	Did not advance							
Daniel Fernandes	−73 kg	Xie Jh (CHN); W 0210–0101	Razvozov (ISR); W 1000–0001	Guilheiro (BRA); W 0101–0010	Makarov (RUS); L 0001–1000	Bye			Pedro (USA); L 0001–1110	5
Cédric Claverie	−81 kg	Kwon Y-W (KOR); L 0001–0111	Did not advance							
Frédéric Demontfaucon	−90 kg	Goldschmied (MEX); W 1010–0000	Olson (USA); W 1000–0000	Zviadauri (GEO); L 0000–0010	Did not advance	Bye	Taov (RUS); L 0020–0100	Did not advance		
Ghislain Lemaire	−100 kg	Pálkovács (SVK); W 1000–0000	Maksimov (RUS); W 1001–0000	Jurack (GER); L 0012–0020	Did not advance	Bye	Despaigne (CUB); W 0221–0000	Ze'evi (ISR); L 0000–1001	Did not advance	
Matthieu Bataille	+100 kg	Tangriev (UZB); L 0001–1120	Did not advance							

Women

Athlete	Event	Round of 32	Round of 16	Quarterfinals	Semifinals	Repechage 1	Repechage 2	Repechage 3	Final / BM	
Athlete	Event	Opposition Result	Opposition Result	Opposition Result	Opposition Result	Opposition Result	Opposition Result	Opposition Result	Opposition Result	Rank
Frédérique Jossinet	−48 kg	Chervonsky (AUS); W 0200–0000	Moskvina (BLR); W 1000–0000	Gao F (CHN); W 0102–0011	Matijass (GER); W 1000–0000	Bye			Tani (JPN); L 0001–0112	2nd place, silver medalist(s)
Annabelle Euranie	−52 kg	Bye	Aluaș (ROM); W 0111–0030	Monteiro (POR); W 0001–0000	Xian Dm (CHN); L 0010–1001	Bye			Heylen (BEL); L 0000–0001	5
Barbara Harel	−57 kg	Bye	Lupetey (CUB); L 0000–1000	Did not advance		Bye	Göldi (SUI); W WO	Yukhareva (RUS); W 0020–0001	Gravenstijn (NED); L 0010–1000	5
Lucie Décosse	−63 kg	Álvarez (ESP); W 1000–0001	Dixon (AUS); W 1010–0000	Krukower (ARG); L 0000–0001	Did not advance	Bye	Lee B-H (KOR); W 0111–0100	Chisholm (CAN); L 0001–1010	Did not advance	
Céline Lebrun	−78 kg	Bye	Kubes (USA); W 1011–0000	Silva (BRA); W 0001–0000	Anno (JPN); L 0000–0010	Bye			Laborde (CUB); L 0001–1001	5
Éva Bisséni	+78 kg	Patsiou (GRE); W 1000–0000	Blanco (VEN); L 0000–0002	Did not advance						

== Modern pentathlon ==
France has qualified four athletes in modern pentathlon

Athlete	Event	Shooting (10 m air pistol)			Fencing (épée one touch)			Swimming (200 m freestyle)			Riding (show jumping)			Running (3000 m)			Total points	Final rank
Athlete	Event	Points	Rank	MP Points	Results	Rank	MP points	Time	Rank	MP points	Penalties	Rank	MP points	Time	Rank	MP Points	Total points	Final rank
Raphaël Astier	Men's	163	32	892	14–17	=19	776	2:06.93	10	1280	204	27	996	10:03.64	19	988	4932	25
Sébastien Deleigne	Men's	180	10	1096	15–16	=15	804	2:12.27	24	1216	196	24	1004	9:45.31	7	1060	5180	15
Amélie Cazé	Women's	170	17	976	17–14	=7	860	2:14.44	1	1308	124	19	1076	11:39.41	23	924	5144	12
Blandine Lachèze	Women's	179	7	1084	13–18	=22	748	2:26.31	19	1168	84	11	1116	11:52.47	28	872	4988	19

== Rowing ==
Men

Athlete	Event	Heats		Repechage		Semifinals		Final	
Athlete	Event	Time	Rank	Time	Rank	Time	Rank	Time	Rank
Adrien Hardy; Sébastien Vieilledent	Double sculls	6:45.76	1 SA/B	Bye		6:12.40	2 FA	6:29.00	1st place, gold medalist(s)
Frédéric Dufour; Pascal Touron	Lightweight double sculls	6:14.55	1 SA/B	Bye		6:16.33	1 FA	6:21.46	2nd place, silver medalist(s)
Cédric Berrest; Jonathan Coeffic; Frédéric Perrier; Xavier Philippe	Quadruple sculls	5:50.74	4 R	5:50.83	4	Did not advance			
Jean-David Bernard; Laurent Cadot; Bastien Gallet; Christophe Lattaignant (cox); Jean-Baptiste Macquet; Donatien Mortelette; Anthony Perrot; Julien Peudecoeur; Bastien Ripoll	Eight	5:29.55	4 R	5:34.20	2 FA	—N/a		5:53.31	6

Women

Athlete	Event	Heats		Repechage		Final	
Athlete	Event	Time	Rank	Time	Rank	Time	Rank
Sophie Balmary; Virginie Chauvel	Pair	7:49.70	4 R	7:24.19	4 FB	7:17.94	10
Gaelle Buniet; Caroline Delas	Double sculls	7:41.23	4 R	7:03.50	4 FB	6:52.55	7

Qualification Legend: FA=Final A (medal); FB=Final B (non-medal); FC=Final C (non-medal); FD=Final D (non-medal); FE=Final E (non-medal); FF=Final F (non-medal); SA/B=Semifinals A/B; SC/D=Semifinals C/D; SE/F=Semifinals E/F; R=Repechage

== Sailing ==
Men

Athlete	Event	Race											Net points	Final rank
Athlete	Event	1	2	3	4	5	6	7	8	9	10	M*	Net points	Final rank
Julien Bontemps	Mistral	5	~~DSQ~~	9	8	12	11	6	14	4	2	18	89	9
Guillaume Florent	Finn	7	7	5	16	3	9	9	15	13	12	~~19~~	96	8
Nicolas Le Berre; Gildas Philippe	470	14	2	13	7	2	~~17~~	15	17	12	13	2	97	5
Pascal Rambeau; Xavier Rohart	Star	3	9	6	~~15~~	7	2	4	12	3	1	7	54	3rd place, bronze medalist(s)

Women

Athlete	Event	Race											Net points	Final rank
Athlete	Event	1	2	3	4	5	6	7	8	9	10	M*	Net points	Final rank
Faustine Merret	Mistral	2	~~13~~	1	4	2	4	4	5	4	3	2	31	1st place, gold medalist(s)
Blandine Rouille	Europe	~~25~~	17	4	5	5	18	3	14	14	11	6	97	11
Nadege Douroux; Ingrid Petitjean	470	8	3	5	7	7	~~20~~	19	18	10	14	9	100	10
Marion Deplanque; Anne Le Helley; Elodie Lesaffre	Yngling	3	2	~~14~~	11	9	13	10	3	2	3	1	57	5

Open

Athlete	Event	Race																Net points	Final rank
Athlete	Event	1	2	3	4	5	6	7	8	9	10	11	12	13	14	15	M*	Net points	Final rank
Felix Pruvot	Laser	10	~~DSQ~~	32	10	17	8	32	23	1	9	—N/a					1	143	15
Marc Audineau; Stéphane Christidis	49er	6	10	14	11	~~16~~	1	12	14	4	~~18~~	11	11	4	8	10	14	130	11
Olivier Backes; Laurent Voiron	Tornado	4	~~12~~	11	2	5	4	11	5	5	8	—N/a					2	57	4

M = Medal race; OCS = On course side of the starting line; DSQ = Disqualified; DNF = Did not finish; DNS= Did not start; RDG = Redress given

== Shooting ==
Men

Athlete	Event	Qualification		Final	
Athlete	Event	Points	Rank	Points	Rank
Stéphane Clamens	Trap	119	=9	Did not advance	
Franck Dumoulin	10 m air pistol	577	=20	Did not advance	
Franck Dumoulin	50 m pistol	550	=24	Did not advance	
Yves Tronc	Trap	112	=27	Did not advance	
Anthony Terras	Skeet	121	=9	Did not advance	

Women

Athlete	Event	Qualification		Final	
Athlete	Event	Points	Rank	Points	Rank
Valérie Bellenoue	10 m air rifle	392	=22	Did not advance	
Valérie Bellenoue	50 m rifle 3 positions	574	16	Did not advance	
Laurence Brize	10 m air rifle	396	8 Q	497.9	7
Laurence Brize	50 m rifle 3 positions	578	=9	Did not advance	
Stéphanie Neau	Trap	57	12	Did not advance	
Brigitte Roy	10 m air pistol	374	=30	Did not advance	
Brigitte Roy	25 m pistol	578	=10	Did not advance	

== Swimming ==
French swimmers earned qualifying standards in the following events (up to a maximum of 2 swimmers in each event at the A-standard time, and 1 at the B-standard time):

Men

Athlete	Event	Heat		Semifinal		Final	
Athlete	Event	Time	Rank	Time	Rank	Time	Rank
Romain Barnier	100 m freestyle	49.49	7 Q	49.63	12	Did not advance	
Frédérick Bousquet	50 m freestyle	22.24	2 Q	22.29	12	Did not advance	
Frédérick Bousquet	100 m freestyle	49.08	5 Q	49.25	10	Did not advance	
Frédérick Bousquet	100 m butterfly	53.63	25	Did not advance			
Hugues Duboscq	100 m breaststroke	1:01.15	6 Q	1:01.17	7 Q	1:00.88 NR	3rd place, bronze medalist(s)
Hugues Duboscq	200 m breaststroke	2:16.56	25	Did not advance			
Simon Dufour	100 m backstroke	55.76	13 Q	56.15	16	Did not advance	
Simon Dufour	200 m backstroke	1:59.52	6 Q	1:58.96	6 Q	1:58.49	6
Franck Esposito	100 m butterfly	52.61	8 Q	52.88	11	Did not advance	
Franck Esposito	200 m butterfly	1:58.12	7 Q	1:59.00	15	Did not advance	
Pierre Roger	100 m backstroke	56.07	21	Did not advance			
Nicolas Rostoucher	200 m freestyle	1:50.96	25	Did not advance			
Nicolas Rostoucher	400 m freestyle	3:50.73	12	—N/a		Did not advance	
Nicolas Rostoucher	1500 m freestyle	15:13.56	11	—N/a		Did not advance	
Julien Sicot	50 m freestyle	22.30	6 Q	22.26	10	Did not advance	
Romain Barnier; Frédérick Bousquet; Fabien Gilot; Amaury Leveaux*; Julien Sicot	4 × 100 m freestyle relay	3:17.64	=6 Q	—N/a		3:16.23	7
Fabien Horth; Nicolas Kintz; Amaury Leveaux; Nicolas Rostoucher	4 × 200 m freestyle relay	7:21.31	8 Q	—N/a		7:17.43	7
Frédérick Bousquet; Hugues Duboscq; Simon Dufour; Franck Esposito	4 × 100 m medley relay	3:37.60	6 Q	—N/a		3:36.57	5

* Competed only in heats

Women

Athlete	Event	Heat		Semifinal		Final	
Athlete	Event	Time	Rank	Time	Rank	Time	Rank
Solenne Figuès	200 m freestyle	1:59.90	5 Q	1:58.65	2 Q	1:58.45	3rd place, bronze medalist(s)
Laure Manaudou	400 m freestyle	4:06.76	1 Q	—N/a		4:05.34 EU	1st place, gold medalist(s)
Laure Manaudou	800 m freestyle	8:25.91	1 Q	—N/a		8:24.96	2nd place, silver medalist(s)
Laure Manaudou	100 m backstroke	1:01.27	1 Q	1:00.88	2 Q	1:00.88	3rd place, bronze medalist(s)
Malia Metella	50 m freestyle	25.21	3 Q	24.99	3 Q	24.89	2nd place, silver medalist(s)
Malia Metella	100 m freestyle	55.08	5 Q	54.57	4 Q	54.50	4
Malia Metella	100 m butterfly	59.38	9 Q	59.28	9	did not advance	
Aurore Mongel	100 m butterfly	1:00.65	25	did not advance			
Aurore Mongel	200 m butterfly	2:12.26	15 Q	2:11.13	11	did not advance	
Alexandra Putra	100 m backstroke	1:04.13	29	did not advance			
Alexandra Putra	200 m backstroke	2:19.75	27	did not advance			
Céline Couderc; Solenne Figuès; Malia Metella; Aurore Mongel	4 × 100 m freestyle relay	3:42.42	7 Q	—N/a		3:40.23	5
Céline Couderc; Solenne Figuès; Elsa N'Guessan; Katarin Quelennec	4 × 200 m freestyle relay	8:09.42	10	—N/a		did not advance	
Malia Metella; Aurore Mongel; Alexandra Putra; Laurie Thomassin	4 × 100 m medley relay	4:11.42	14	—N/a		did not advance	

== Synchronized swimming ==
Athlete	Event	Technical routine		Free routine (preliminary)			Free routine (final)		
Athlete	Event	Points	Rank	Points	Total (technical + free)	Rank	Points	Total (technical + free)	Rank
Virginie Dedieu; Laure Thibaud	Duet	47.667	5	47.584	95.167	6 Q	47.917	95.584	5

== Table tennis ==
Athlete	Event	Round 1	Round 2	Round 3	Round 4	Quarterfinals	Semifinals	Final / BM	
Athlete	Event	Opposition Result	Opposition Result	Opposition Result	Opposition Result	Opposition Result	Opposition Result	Opposition Result	Rank
Patrick Chila	Men's singles	Bye	Toriola (NGR); W 4–2	Boll (GER); L 1–4	did not advance				

== Taekwondo ==
Athlete	Event	Round of 16	Quarterfinals	Semifinals	Repechage 1	Repechage 2	Final / BM	
Athlete	Event	Opposition Result	Opposition Result	Opposition Result	Opposition Result	Opposition Result	Opposition Result	Rank
Christophe Negrel	Men's −80 kg	Stevens (NED); W 13–10	Ahmadov (AZE); L 17–24	did not advance				
Pascal Gentil	Men's +80 kg	Chukwumerije (NGR); W 2–0	Moitland (CRC); W 4–(−1)	Moon D-S (KOR); L 3–5	Bye	Zrouri (MAR); W 3–1	Kamal (JOR); W 6–2	3rd place, bronze medalist(s)
Gwladys Épangue	Women's −57 kg	Corsi (ITA); L 0–2	did not advance					
Myriam Baverel	Women's +67 kg	Bosshart (CAN); W 7–5	Castrignano (ITA); W 8–8 SUP	Dawani (JOR); W 3–3 SUP	Bye		Chen Z (CHN); L 5–12	2nd place, silver medalist(s)

== Tennis ==
Men

Athlete	Event	Round of 64	Round of 32	Round of 16	Quarterfinals	Semifinals	Final / BM	
Athlete	Event	Opposition Score	Opposition Score	Opposition Score	Opposition Score	Opposition Score	Opposition Score	Rank
Grégory Carraz	Singles	Baghdatis (CYP); L 7–5, 6–7^{(5–7)}, 5–7	did not advance					
Arnaud Clément	Singles	Lapentti (ECU); W 7–6^{(7–5)}, 6–2	Karlović (CRO); L 6–7^{(4–7)}, 6–4, 4–6	did not advance				
Sébastien Grosjean	Singles	Horna (PER); W 6–2, 7–5	Arthurs (AUS); W 7–6^{(7–2)}, 6–3	López (ESP); W 6–7^{(4–7)}, 6–4, 6–0	González (CHI); L 2–6, 6–2, 4–6	did not advance		
Fabrice Santoro	Singles	Volandri (ITA); W 6–1, 6–2	Robredo (ESP); L 6–1, 3–6, 4–6	did not advance				
Arnaud Clément; Sébastien Grosjean	Doubles	—N/a	Black / Ullyett (ZIM); L 7–5, 4–6, 7–9	did not advance				
Michaël Llodra; Fabrice Santoro	Doubles	—N/a	Malisse / Rochus (BEL); W 6–3, 6–2	Nestor / Niemeyer (CAN); W 6–3, 6–7^{(5–7)}, 6–3	Ančić / Ljubičić (CRO); L 6–4, 3–6, 7–9	did not advance		

Women

Athlete	Event	Round of 64	Round of 32	Round of 16	Quarterfinals	Semifinals	Final / BM	
Athlete	Event	Opposition Score	Opposition Score	Opposition Score	Opposition Score	Opposition Score	Opposition Score	Rank
Nathalie Dechy	Singles	Suárez (ARG); L 7–6^{(7–1)}, 6–7^{(5–7)}, 7–9	did not advance					
Amélie Mauresmo	Singles	Martínez (ESP); W 6–1, 6–4	Camerin (ITA); W 6–0, 6–1	Rubin (USA); W 6–3, 6–1	Kuznetsova (RUS); W 7–6^{(7–5)}, 4–6, 6–2	Molik (AUS); W 7–6^{(10–8)}, 6–3	Henin-Hardenne (BEL); L 3–6, 3–6	2nd place, silver medalist(s)
Mary Pierce	Singles	Medina Garrigues (ESP); W 6–3, 7–5	Petrova (RUS); W 6–2, 6–1	Williams (USA); W 6–4, 6–4	Henin-Hardenne (BEL); L 4–6, 4–6	did not advance		
Sandrine Testud	Singles	Elia (ITA); L 0–6, 2–6	did not advance					
Nathalie Dechy; Sandrine Testud	Doubles	—N/a	Križan / Srebotnik (SLO); W 7–5, 6–3	Kuznetsova / Likhovtseva (RUS); W 2–6, 7–6^{(7–5)}, 6–3	Suárez / Tarabini (ARG); L 4–6, 6–1, 4–6	did not advance		
Amélie Mauresmo; Mary Pierce	Doubles	—N/a	Daniilidou / Zachariadou (GRE); W 7–5, 6–1	Navratilova / Raymond (USA); L RET	did not advance			

== Triathlon ==
While the French had fewer top eight triathletes in 2004 than they had in 2000, Frédéric Belaubre earned the highest individual place of any French triathlete with a fifth-place finish. France's sole female triathlete was the last to finish.

Athlete	Event	Swim (1.5 km)	Trans 1	Bike (40 km)	Trans 2	Run (10 km)	Total Time	Rank
Frédéric Belaubre	Men's	18:04	0:19	1:00:58	0:24	32:58	1:52:00.53	5
Carl Blasco	Men's	18:06	0:18	1:01:43	0:19	33:31	1:53:20.16	12
Stéphane Poulat	Men's	18:04	0:19	1:01:43	0:20	34:04	1:53:51.35	14
Delphine Pelletier	Women's	20:40	0:19	1:18:13	0:27	43:46	2:22:39.28	44

== Volleyball ==
=== Beach ===
Athlete	Event	Preliminary round	Standing	Round of 16	Quarterfinals	Semifinals	Final	
Athlete	Event	Opposition Score	Standing	Opposition Score	Opposition Score	Opposition Score	Opposition Score	Rank
Stéphane Canet; Mathieu Hamel	Men's	Pool B Araújo – Insfran (BRA); L 0 – 2 (13–21, 14–21); Dieckmann – Scheuerpflug (GER); W 2 – 1 (17–21, 21–18, 15–10); Álvarez – Rossell (CUB); L 0 – 2 (18–21, 19–21)	4	did not advance				

=== Indoor ===
==== Men's tournament ====
Roster

The following is the French roster in the men's volleyball tournament of the 2004 Summer Olympics.

Head coach: Philippe Blain

№	Name	Date of birth	Height	Weight	Spike	Block	2004 club
2	Hubert Henno (L)	6 October 1976	1.88 m (6 ft 2 in)	83 kg (183 lb)	330 cm (130 in)	310 cm (120 in)	(France) Tours VB
3	Dominique Daquin (c)	10 November 1972	1.97 m (6 ft 6 in)	85 kg (187 lb)	352 cm (139 in)	325 cm (128 in)	(Russia) VC Dynamo Moscow
7	Stéphane Antiga	3 February 1976	2.00 m (6 ft 7 in)	94 kg (207 lb)	344 cm (135 in)	321 cm (126 in)	(Italy) Bre Banca Lannutti Cuneo
8	Laurent Capet	5 May 1972	2.02 m (6 ft 8 in)	92 kg (203 lb)	350 cm (140 in)	325 cm (128 in)	(France) Tourcoing LM
9	Frantz Granvorka	10 March 1976	1.95 m (6 ft 5 in)	90 kg (200 lb)	364 cm (143 in)	327 cm (129 in)	(Greece) Iraklis VC
10	Vincent Montmeát	1 September 1977	1.96 m (6 ft 5 in)	88 kg (194 lb)	348 cm (137 in)	330 cm (130 in)	(France) Stade Poitevin Poitiers
11	Loïc De Kergret	20 August 1970	1.93 m (6 ft 4 in)	89 kg (196 lb)	335 cm (132 in)	315 cm (124 in)	(France) Tours VB
14	Philippe Barça-Cysique	22 April 1977	1.94 m (6 ft 4 in)	88 kg (194 lb)	347 cm (137 in)	325 cm (128 in)	(France) Nice VB
15	Guillaume Samica	28 September 1981	1.96 m (6 ft 5 in)	82 kg (181 lb)	343 cm (135 in)	318 cm (125 in)	(Italy) Bre Banca Lannutti Cuneo
16	Mathias Patin	25 April 1974	1.85 m (6 ft 1 in)	73 kg (161 lb)	325 cm (128 in)	315 cm (124 in)	(France) Paris Volley
17	Oliver Kieffer	27 August 1979	2.00 m (6 ft 7 in)	85 kg (187 lb)	355 cm (140 in)	335 cm (132 in)	(France) Paris Volley
18	Sébastien Frangolacci	31 March 1976	1.92 m (6 ft 4 in)	88 kg (194 lb)	340 cm (130 in)	322 cm (127 in)	(France) Paris Volley

Group play

Pos	Team	Pld	W	L	Pts	SW	SL	SR	SPW	SPL	SPR	Qualification
1	Serbia and Montenegro	5	4	1	9	12	6	2.000	427	398	1.073	Quarterfinals
2	Greece	5	3	2	8	12	9	1.333	475	454	1.046	Quarterfinals
3	Argentina	5	3	2	8	12	9	1.333	471	457	1.031	Quarterfinals
4	Poland	5	3	2	8	10	9	1.111	422	419	1.007	Quarterfinals
5	France	5	2	3	7	8	10	0.800	405	394	1.028	
6	Tunisia	5	0	5	5	4	15	0.267	373	451	0.827	

Source: FIVB

15 August 2004; 14:00	Argentina	3–0	France	Peace and Friendship Stadium; Attendance: 2,370; Referees: Ning Wang (CHN), Hiroyuki Ito (JPN)
15 August 2004; 14:00	(25–15, 25–23, 25–22) result			Peace and Friendship Stadium; Attendance: 2,370; Referees: Ning Wang (CHN), Hiroyuki Ito (JPN)

17 August 2004; 11:25	France	0–3	Serbia and Montenegro	Peace and Friendship Stadium; Attendance: 1,000; Referees: Frank Leuthaeusser (GER), Bela Hobor (HUN)
17 August 2004; 11:25	(21–25, 28–30, 22–25) result			Peace and Friendship Stadium; Attendance: 1,000; Referees: Frank Leuthaeusser (GER), Bela Hobor (HUN)

19 August 2004; 14:00	Poland	0–3	France	Peace and Friendship Stadium; Attendance: 5,230; Referees: Jarmo Salonen (FIN), Luciano Gaspari (ITA)
19 August 2004; 14:00	(15–25, 18–25, 17–25) result			Peace and Friendship Stadium; Attendance: 5,230; Referees: Jarmo Salonen (FIN), Luciano Gaspari (ITA)

21 August 2004; 19:30	Greece	3–2	France	Peace and Friendship Stadium; Attendance: 9,360; Referees: Umit Sokullu (TUR), Frank Leuthaeusser (GER)
21 August 2004; 19:30	(25–22, 14–25, 26–24, 23–25, 15–10) result			Peace and Friendship Stadium; Attendance: 9,360; Referees: Umit Sokullu (TUR), Frank Leuthaeusser (GER)

23 August 2004; 09:00	France	3–1	Tunisia	Peace and Friendship Stadium; Attendance: 1,860; Referees: Francisco Medina (CUB), Fernando Nava (MEX)
23 August 2004; 09:00	(25–23, 18–25, 25–19, 25–19) result			Peace and Friendship Stadium; Attendance: 1,860; Referees: Francisco Medina (CUB), Fernando Nava (MEX)

== Weightlifting ==
Athlete	Event	Snatch		Clean & Jerk		Total	Rank
Athlete	Event	Result	Rank	Result	Rank	Total	Rank
Eric Bonnel	Men's −56 kg	~~112.5~~	DNF	—	—	—	DNF
Samson Ndicka	Men's −62 kg	127.5	=10	160	=5	287.5	6
Romuald Ernault	Men's −69 kg	142.5	=8	165	8	307.5	7
David Matam	Men's −85 kg	167.5	=6	~~192.5~~	DNF	167.5	DNF
Virginie Lachaume	Women's −53 kg	75	=7	100	8	175	7

== Wrestling ==
Key:

- VT – Victory by Fall.
- PP – Decision by Points – the loser with technical points.
- PO – Decision by Points – the loser without technical points.

Men's freestyle

Athlete	Event	Elimination Pool			Quarterfinal	Semifinal	Final / BM	
Athlete	Event	Opposition Result	Opposition Result	Rank	Opposition Result	Opposition Result	Opposition Result	Rank
Vincent Aka-Akesse	−84 kg	Mindorashvili (GEO); L 0–3 ^{PO}	Loizidis (GRE); L 0–3 ^{PO}	3	did not advance			20

Men's Greco-Roman

Athlete	Event	Elimination Pool			Quarterfinal	Semifinal	Final / BM	
Athlete	Event	Opposition Result	Opposition Result	Rank	Opposition Result	Opposition Result	Opposition Result	Rank
Mélonin Noumonvi	−84 kg	Tsitsiashvili (ISR); L 1–3 ^{PP}	Mishin (RUS); L 0–3 ^{PO}	3	did not advance			16
Yannick Szczepaniak	−120 kg	Galstyan (ARM); W 3–1 ^{PP}	Barreno (VEN); W 4–0 ^{ST}	1 Q	Barzi (IRI); L 0–3 ^{PO}	Did not advance	López (CUB); L 0–5 ^{VT}	6

Women's freestyle

Athlete	Event	Elimination Pool			Classification	Semifinal	Final / BM	
Athlete	Event	Opposition Result	Opposition Result	Rank	Opposition Result	Opposition Result	Opposition Result	Rank
Angélique Berthenet	−48 kg	Enkhjargal (MGL); W 3–1 ^{PP}	Ross (GBS); W 5–0 ^{VT}	1 Q	Bye	C Icho (JPN); L 1–4 ^{SP}	Miranda (USA); L 1–3 ^{PP}	4
Anna Gomis	−55 kg	Lee N-L (KOR); W 3–1 ^{PP}	Poumpouridou (GRE); W 4–0 ^{ST}	1 Q	Bye	Yoshida (JPN); L 1–3 ^{PP}	Karlsson (SWE); W 3–0 ^{PO}	3rd place, bronze medalist(s)
Lise Legrand	−63 kg	Khilko (BLR); W 3–1 ^{PP}	Ivanova (TJK); W 3–0 ^{PO}	1 Q	Bye	K Icho (JPN); L 0–3 ^{PO}	Zygouri (GRE); W 5–0 ^{VT}	3rd place, bronze medalist(s)

== See also ==
- France at the 2004 Summer Paralympics
- France at the 2005 Mediterranean Games
