= 2000 European Women's Handball Championship squads =

The following squads and players competed in the European Women's Handball Championship in 2000 in Romania.

== Austria ==
1. Nataliya Rusnatchenko (GK)
2. Kathrin Gaksch
3. Birgit Engl (CB)
4. Stephanie Ofenböck (CB)
5. Katrin Engel (RB)
6. Alexandra Materzok
7. Nina Winter
8. Erika Schweighofer
9. Ariane Maier
10. Laura Fritz
11. Barbara Strass (LW)
12. Barbara Wondrasch
13. Magdalena Materzok
14. Edith Mika
15. Nadine Urban

== Belarus ==
1. Natallia Petrakova
2. Raisa Tsikhanovich
3. Alla Matushkovitz
4. Larysa Mezhinskaya
5. Elena Koulik
6. Tatsiana Famenka
7. Hanna Halynskaya
8. Tatsiana Silitch
9. Tatsiana Khlimankova
10. Irinna Kalpakova
11. Svetlana Minevskaia
12. Natalia Anisimova
13. Natalia Tsvirko
14. Natalia Siarko

== Denmark ==
1. Lene Rantala (GK)
2. Karin Mortensen (GK)
3. Majken Larsen (RB)
4. Mette Vestergaard (RB)
5. Christina Roslyng Hansen (LW)
6. Pernille Hansen (LP)
7. Rikke Hörlykke Jörgensen (CB)
8. Anja Nielsen (RW)
9. Lotte Faldborg Kiaerskou (CB)
10. Winnie Mølgaard (CB)
11. Rikke Erhardsen Skov (LB)
12. Line Daugaard (LW)
13. Louise Pedersen (RW)
14. Merethe Hansen (RB)

== France ==
1. Joanne Dudziak (GK)
2. Valérie Nicolas (GK)
3. Estelle Vogein (RW)
4. Leila Duchemann-Lejeune (LB)
5. Sandrine Delerce-Mariot (CB)
6. Melinda Jacques-Szabo (RB)
7. Nodjialem Myaro (LB)
8. Véronique Pecqueux-Rolland (LP)
9. Stéphanie Cano (RW)
10. Isabelle Wendling (LP)
11. Seynabou Benga (LB)
12. Raphaëlle Tervel (LW)
13. Chantal Maio (LW)
14. Marie-Annick Dezert (GK)
15. Myriame Said Mohamed (LB)

== Germany ==
1. Eike Bram (GK)
2. Silke Christiansen (GK)
3. Ingrida Radzeviciute (LB)
4. Grit Jurack (RB)
5. Annika Schafferus (LB)
6. Alexandra Uhlig (CB)
7. Nikola Pietzsch (LB)
8. Melanie Schliecker (RW)
9. Kathrin Blacha (LP)
10. Franziska Heinz (LB)
11. Heike Schmidt (CB)
12. Agnieszka Tobiasz (RW)
13. Heike Ahlgrimm (LB)
14. Anke Schulz (LW)
15. Janet Grunow (CB)
16. Sylvia Harlander (GK)

== Hungary ==
1. Tímea Sugár (GK)
2. Katalin Pálinger (GK)
3. Anikó Kántor (RW)
4. Zsuzsanna Pálffy (RW)
5. Nikolett Brigovácz (RB)
6. Krisztina Nagy (RB)
7. Ildikó Pádár (LP)
8. Anita Kulcsár (LP)
9. Beáta Siti (CB)
10. Eszter Siti (CB)
11. Judit Simics (LB)
12. Ágnes Farkas (LB)
13. Krisztina Pigniczki (CB)
14. Erika Kirsner (LW)
15. Beatrix Kökény (CB)
16. Gabriella Kindl (LB)

== Macedonia ==
1. Oksana Maslova
2. Gordana Naceva
3. Biljana Crvenkoska
4. Dana Filipovska
5. Anzela Platon
6. Mirjana Cupic
7. Valentina Radulovic Tarculovska
8. Marina Abramova
9. Larisa Ferzalieva
10. Klara Boeva
11. Mileva Velkova
12. Marija Papudzieva

== Norway ==
1. Mimi J. Kopperud Slevigen (GK)
2. Hege Anett Pettersson (GK)
3. Kristine Duvholt Havnas (RW)
4. Cecilie Louise Thorsteinsen (RB)
5. Else-Marthe Sörlie-Lybekk (LP)
6. Monica Sandve (LW)
7. Camilla Nordberg Thorsen (LW)
8. Gro Hammerseng (CB)
9. Birgitte Saettem (LB)
10. Elisabeth Hilmo (LP)
11. Marianne Rokne (LB)
12. Camilla Carstens (CB)
13. Hege Christin Vikebø (LP)
14. Karoline Dyhre Breivang (CB)
15. Vigdis Haarsaker (RW)
16. Jeanett Nielsen (GK)

== Romania ==
1. Cristina Maria Dogaru (GK)
2. Luminita Hutupan (GK)
3. Carmen Liliana Nitescu (LB)
4. Mihaela Ignat (CB)
5. Cristina Nicoleta Gisca (RW)
6. Cristina Dumitrescu (RB)
7. Simona Silvia Gogirla (LB)
8. Victorina Bora (LP)
9. Cristina Georgiana Varzaru (RW)
10. Steluta Luca (RB)
11. Alina Ariton (LW)
12. Aurelia Stoica (CB)
13. Marinela Patru (LW)
14. Madalina Straton (CB)
15. Elena Roxana Gheorghe (CB)

== Russia ==
1. Tatiana Alizar (GK)
2. Inna Suslina (GK)
3. Tatiana Diadetchko (LP)
4. Oksana Romenskaya (LP)
5. Natalia Gontcharova (LW)
6. Olga Buyanova (LB)
7. Liudmila Bodnieva (LP)
8. Nadezda Muravyeva (LB)
9. Anna Ignattchenko (RW)
10. Olena Yakovleva (LB)
11. Irina Poltoratskaya (CB)
12. Marina Naukovich (LB)
13. Nigina Saidova (GK)
14. Inna Volkova (GK)
15. Nadezhda Konnova (CB)
16. Anna Kareeva (LB)

== Ukraine ==
1. Nataliya Borysenko (GK)
2. Tetyana Vorozhtsova (GK)
3. Olga Popovich (LP)
4. Liliya Stolpakova (LW)
5. Tetiana Brabinko-Salogub (LP)
6. Maryna Vergelyuk (RB)
7. Ganna Syukalo (CB)
8. Tetyana Yaresko (CB)
9. Olena Tsyhytsia (LB)
10. Olena Reznir (RB)
11. Galyna Markushevska (LP)
12. Olena Radchenko (LW)
13. Irina Honcharova (GK)
14. Larysa Kharlanyuk (LB)
15. Olena Yatsenko (RW)

== Yugoslavia ==
1. Zlata Paplacko (GK)
2. Branka Jovanovic (GK)
3. Tatjana Medved (LB)
4. Tanja Milanovic (LB)
5. Sandra Kolakovic (CB)
6. Sanja Jovovic (LB)
7. Snezana Damjanac (LW)
8. Maja Savic (LW)
9. Bojana Petrovic (LB)
10. Milanka Celebic (CB)
11. Tatjana Jeraminok (LP)
12. Dragica Milickovic (LP)
13. Aida Selmanovic (RB)
14. Emina Krasnic (RB)
15. Jelena Nisavic (LW)
