= ESBF Besançon =

French handball club

- Full name: Entente sportive Besançon féminin
- Founded: 1970
- Arena: Palais des sports Ghani-Yalouz
- Capacity: 3,380
- President: Daniel Hournon
- Head coach: Jérôme Delarue
- League: French Women's First League
- 2024–25: 5th
- Club colours
Home	Away

ESBF Besançon is a French women's handball club based in Besançon. They play in the French Women's First League.

== History ==
=== Formation ===
The club was founded as Entente sportive bisontine in 1970 after HBC Besançon had dispanded. In the beginning the team had women's and men's teams.

In 1988 the team won their first French Championship.

=== Separating the Women's team and domestic dominance ===
In 1992 the club president Jacques Mariot decided to split the men's and women's team.

The club was dominating in French handball between 1995 and 2005 together with Metz Handball. In this period they on 3 national championships, and finished 2nd in the other 7 seasons. They also won the Coupe de France four times and the Coupe de la Ligue twice, as well as the EHF Cup Winners' Cup in 2003. The 2003 French team that won the World Championship had several players from ESBF Besançon, including Valérie Nicolas, Sophie Herbrecht, Raphaëlle Tervel, Véronique Pecqueux-Rolland, Myriame Said Mohamed and Sandrine Delerce.

=== Economic difficulties ===
After 2003 the club began to have economic difficulties, and their star players began to leave. In 2005 they were relegated administratively, and got a recruitment ban. In the 2007-08 season, the team was promoted again, but they were quickly relegated.

In the 2014-15 season, the club was promoted to the First League, and finished 6th the following season. In 2017 they managed to finish 4th despite injuries to key players Amanda Kolczynski and Ana Manaut.

== Honours ==
- French Women's First League:
  - Gold: 1988, 1998, 2001, 2003
  - Bronze: 1996, 1997, 1999, 2000, 2002, 2004, 2005, 2018
- Coupe de France:
  - Winner: 2001, 2002, 2003, 2005
- Coupe de la Ligue:
  - Winner: 2003, 2004
- EHF Cup Winners' Cup:
  - Winner: 2003

== Current squad ==
Squad for the 2025–26 season

Goalkeepers

- 1 (Norway) Tonje Haug Lerstad
- 21 (France) Florence Bonnet
- 94 (France) Catherine Gabriel

Wingers
RW

- 31 (France) (Algeria) Sabrina Zazai
- 77 (France) Emilie Bellec

LW

- 11 (France) Chloé Bellonnet
- 95 (France) Zaliata Mlamali

Line players

- 23 (France) Pauline Robert
- 88 (France) Camille Mandret

Back players
LB

- 24 (Sweden) Charité Mumbongo
- 28 (France) Ilona Di Rocco
- 43 (France) Prunelle Kingue

CB

- 7 (France) Alizée Frécon-Demouge
- 18 (France) Juliette Mairot

RB

- 17 (Norway) Celine Solstad
- 19 (North Macedonia) Iva Mladenovska

=== Transfers ===
Transfers for the 2026-27 season

Joining

- (France) Juliette Faure (CB) (from (France) Brest Bretagne Handball)
- (Denmark) Julie Holm (RB) (from (Germany) Thüringer HC)
- (Brazil) Luara Bastos (LW) (from (Brazil) Criciùma Handball)
- (France) Ophélie Tonds (GK) (from (France) Saint-Amand Handball)

Leaving

- (Norway) Tonje Haug Lerstad (GK) (to (France) Toulon Métropole Var Handball)
- (Norway) Celine Solstad (RB) (to (Norway) Fana Håndball)
- (France) Zaliata Mlamali (LW) (to (Spain) Zonzamas PlusCar Lanzarote)
- (North Macedonia) Iva Mladenovska (RB) (to (Germany) Borussia Dortmund Handball)

== European record ==
Season	Competition	Round	Club	Home	Away	Aggregate
2021–22	EHF European League	Round 3	(Spain) CB Atlético Guardés	34–23	30–24	64–47
2021–22	EHF European League	Group stage (Group A)	(Hungary) Mosonmagyaróvári KC SE	34–24	30–38	2nd place
2021–22	EHF European League	Group stage (Group A)	(Norway) Sola HK	32–39	27–34	2nd place
2021–22	EHF European League	Group stage (Group A)	(Croatia) RK Lokomotiva Zagreb	28–27	31–26	2nd place
2021–22	EHF European League	Quarterfinals	(Germany) SG BBM Bietigheim	23–29	20-30	43–59
2022–23	EHF European League	Round 3	(Spain) Super Amara Bera Bera	32–29	27–24	59–53
2022–23	EHF European League	Group stage (Group A)	(Norway) Molde Elite	35–32	41–29	3rd place
2022–23	EHF European League	Group stage (Group A)	(Germany) Borussia Dortmund	21–31	27–30	3rd place
2022–23	EHF European League	Group stage (Group A)	(Hungary) Siófok KC	30–21	18–20	3rd place

== Former notable players ==
- (France) Veronique Pecqueux-Rolland
- (France) Valerie Nicolas
- (France) Joanne Dudziak
- (France) Sophie Herbrecht
- (France) Marion Limal
- (France) Raphaelle Tervel
- (France) Sandrine Delerce
- (France) Laura Glauser
- (France) Stephanie Fiossonangaye
- (France) Myriame Said Mohamed
- (France) Catherine Gabriel
- (France) Chloé Valentini
- (France) Lucie Granier
- (France) Clarisse Mairot
- (Romania) Carmen Amariei
- (Romania) Anamaria Stecz
- (Hungary) Judit Pőcze
- (Russia) Marina Gresset Khatkova
- (Russia) Sofya Berdovich
- (Tunisia) Mouna Chebbah
- (Austria) Svetlana Antic
- (Austria) Stanka Bozovic
- (Croatia) Samira Hasagic
- (Algeria) Nabila Tizi
- (Switzerland) Soka Smitran
- (Norway) Ine Karlsen Stangvik
- (Japan) / (Norway) Sakura Hauge
