= Marija Papudjieva =

Macedonian handball player

Personal information
- Nationality: Macedonian
- Born: 26 June 1977 (age 49)
- Height: 1.69 m (5 ft 7 in)

Sport
- Sport: Handball
- Position: Right wing
- Current club: Bodrum Kalikarnas
- Number: 35
National team
Years	Team	Apps	(Gls)
–	Macedonia	27	(39)
- Updated on 4 December 2012

Marija Papudjieva (born 26 June 1977) is a retired Macedonian handball player that played for Bodrum Kalikarnas and the Macedonian national team.
