= Viviane Jacques =

Brazilian handball player (born 1977)

Personal information
- Nationality: Brazilian
- Born: 1977 (age 48–49) Rio de Janeiro

Sport
- Sport: Handball
- Position: right wing
National team
- Years: Team
- –: Brazil

Viviane Jacques (born 1977) is a Brazilian handball player. She was born in Rio de Janeiro. She competed at the 2000 Summer Olympics in Sydney, where the Brazilian team placed 8th, and also at the 2004 Summer Olympics in Athens and at the 2008 Summer Olympics in Beijing.
