= Anne le Helley =

French sailor

Personal information
- Nationality: French
- Born: 30 May 1971 (age 53); Saint-Brieuc, France

Sport
- Sport: Sailing

Anne le Helley (born 30 May 1971) is a French sailor. She competed at the 2004 Summer Olympics and the 2008 Summer Olympics.
