= Millene Figueiredo =

Brazilian handball player (born 1983)

Milene Figueiredo
Personal information
- Born: 3 February 1983 (age 43) Guarulhos, Brazil

Sport
- Sport: Handball
National team
- Years: Team
- –: Brazil

Milene Figueiredo (born 3 February 1983) is a Brazilian handball player.

She was born in Guarulhos, Brazil. She competed at the 2004 Summer Olympics, where Brazil placed 7th.
