= Winnie Mølgaard =

Danish handball player (born 1977)

Personal information
- Full name: Winnie Mølgaard Ravn
- Nationality: Danish
- Born: 28 July 1977 (age 49) Odense, Denmark

Sport
- Sport: Handball
- Position: Back

Senior clubs
- Years: Team
- 1996-1998: DHG Odense
- 1998-2000: GOG Håndbold
- 2000-2001: Ferrobus Mislata
- 2001-2007: GOG Svendborg TGI
National team
Years	Team	Apps	(Gls)
1999-2005	Denmark	47	(84)
Medal record
European Championship
Gold medal – first place	2002 Denmark
Silver medal – second place	2004 Hungary

Winnie Mølgaard (born 28 July 1977) is a Danish former handball player. She was part of the Danish team that won the 2002 European championship on home soil.

She also won silver medals at the 2004 European championship and participated in the 2000 European championship, where Denmark finished 11th.

She was initially not part of the squad for the 2002 European Championship, but was included in the team when Lotte Kiærskou broke her finger a day before the tournament.

She played her last national team match against Germany on 15 October 2005.

She began her senior career at DHG Odense in 1996 as an amateur player. She joined GOG Håndbold in 1998, as she wanted to play at the top division. She turned professional when she joined Spanish top team Ferrobus Mislata from Valencia for a year in the 2000–2001 season. Afterwards she returned to GOG. She extended her contract in 2006 until 2008. She retired in 2007.
