= 2003 World Women's Handball Championship =

2003 edition of the World Women's Handball Championship

Tournament details
- Host country: Croatia
- Dates: 2 December – 14 December
- Teams: 24

Final positions
- Champions: France (1st title)
- Runners-up: Hungary
- Third place: South Korea
- Fourth place: Ukraine

Tournament statistics
- Top scorer: Bojana Radulović (HUN) (97 goals)

Awards
- Best player: Valérie Nicolas (FRA)

The 2003 World Women's Handball Championship, the 16th handball world championship for women, was played in Croatia between 2 and 14 December 2003.

France won their first ever title, beating Hungary in the final.

== Qualification ==
The following nations were qualified:

Group A	Group B	Group C	Group D
Australia	Angola	Argentina	China
Brazil	Austria	Japan	Ivory Coast
Croatia	Czech Republic	Norway	Denmark
Spain	South Korea	Romania	Germany
France	Russia	Tunisia	Hungary
Serbia and Montenegro	Uruguay	Ukraine	Slovenia

Kazakhstan won the 2002 Asian Women's Handball Championship and thus secured qualification, but decided later to withdraw, giving the spot to Japan instead.

== Preliminary round ==
=== Group A in Split ===
Pos	Team	Pld	W	D	L	GF	GA	GD	Pts	Qualification
1	France	5	5	0	0	149	98	+51	10	Main Round
2	Spain	5	4	0	1	150	120	+30	8	Main Round
3	Serbia and Montenegro	5	3	0	2	165	143	+22	6	Main Round
4	Croatia	5	2	0	3	142	122	+20	4	
5	Brazil	5	1	0	4	136	155	−19	2	
6	Australia	5	0	0	5	74	178	−104	0	

- Tuesday, 2 December:
  - Serbia and Montenegro 41 - 18 Australia
  - Croatia 32 - 25 Brazil
  - France 28 - 25 Spain
- Wednesday, 3 December:
  - Spain 33 - 27 Serbia and Montenegro
  - Australia 12 - 38 Croatia
  - Brazil 15 - 33 France
- Thursday, 4 December:
  - Spain 27 - 25 Brazil
  - Serbia and Montenegro 28 - 24 Croatia
  - France 33 - 13 Australia
- Saturday, 6 December:
  - Australia 12 - 36 Spain
  - Croatia 20 - 28 France
  - Serbia and Montenegro 44 - 41 Brazil
- Sunday, 7 December:
  - Brazil 30 - 19 Australia
  - Croatia 28 - 29 Spain
  - France 27 - 25 Serbia and Montenegro

=== Group B in Poreč ===
Pos	Team	Pld	W	D	L	GF	GA	GD	Pts	Qualification
1	Russia	5	5	0	0	153	106	+47	10	Main Round
2	South Korea	5	4	0	1	165	113	+52	8	Main Round
3	Austria	5	3	0	2	165	130	+35	6	Main Round
4	Czech Republic	5	2	0	3	126	125	+1	4	
5	Angola	5	1	0	4	119	120	−1	2	
6	Uruguay	5	0	0	5	77	211	−134	0	

- Tuesday, 2 December:
  - Russia 28 - 27 South Korea
  - Czech Republic 46 - 16 Uruguay
  - Austria 29 - 19 Angola
- Wednesday, 3 December:
  - South Korea 31 - 18 Czech Republic
  - Angola 22 - 26 Russia
  - Uruguay 20 - 47 Austria
- Thursday, 4 December:
  - South Korea 27 - 21 Angola
  - Czech Republic 22 - 29 Austria
  - Russia 38 - 15 Uruguay
- Saturday, 6 December:
  - Czech Republic 24 - 18 Angola
  - Austria 26 - 30 Russia
  - Uruguay 12 - 41 South Korea
- Sunday, 7 December:
  - Russia 31 - 16 Czech Republic
  - Austria 34 - 39 South Korea
  - Angola 39 - 14 Uruguay

=== Group C in Karlovac ===
Pos	Team	Pld	W	D	L	GF	GA	GD	Pts	Qualification
1	Ukraine	5	4	1	0	158	116	+42	9	Main Round
2	Norway	5	4	0	1	163	108	+55	8	Main Round
3	Romania	5	3	1	1	158	123	+35	7	Main Round
4	Japan	5	2	0	3	133	153	−20	4	
5	Tunisia	5	1	0	4	118	133	−15	2	
6	Argentina	5	0	0	5	74	171	−97	0	

- Tuesday, 2 December:
  - Japan 30 - 24 Tunisia
  - Norway 29 - 30 Ukraine
  - Romania 43 - 13 Argentina
- Wednesday, 3 December:
  - Ukraine 28 - 28 Romania
  - Tunisia 25 - 27 Norway
  - Argentina 16 - 24 Japan
- Thursday, 4 December:
  - Ukraine 33 - 15 Tunisia
  - Norway 45 - 13 Argentina
  - Romania 41 - 30 Japan
- Saturday, 6 December:
  - Argentina 14 - 28 Ukraine
  - Japan 19 - 33 Norway
  - Romania 25 - 23 Tunisia
- Sunday, 7 December:
  - Japan 30 - 39 Ukraine
  - Norway 29 - 21 Romania
  - Tunisia 31 - 18 Argentina

=== Group D in Čakovec ===
Pos	Team	Pld	W	D	L	GF	GA	GD	Pts	Qualification
1	Hungary	5	4	0	1	171	129	+42	8	Main Round
2	Slovenia	5	4	0	1	149	141	+8	8	Main Round
3	Germany	5	3	1	1	144	121	+23	7	Main Round
4	Denmark	5	2	1	2	113	119	−6	5	
5	China	5	1	0	4	135	153	−18	2	
6	Ivory Coast	5	0	0	5	117	166	−49	0	

- Tuesday, 2 December:
  - Hungary 43 - 25 Ivory Coast
  - Slovenia 34 - 26 China
  - Denmark 20 - 20 Germany
- Wednesday, 3 December:
  - Ivory Coast 28 - 32 Slovenia
  - Germany 30 - 27 Hungary
  - China 20 - 29 Denmark
- Thursday, 4 December:
  - Hungary 38 - 25 Slovenia
  - Germany 30 - 28 China
  - Denmark 24 - 21 Ivory Coast
- Saturday, 6 December:
  - Ivory Coast 17 - 36 Germany
  - Hungary 34 - 30 China
  - Slovenia 29 - 21 Denmark
- Sunday, 7 December:
  - China 31 - 26 Ivory Coast
  - Slovenia 29 - 28 Germany
  - Denmark 19 - 29 Hungary

== Main Round ==
Top two teams from each group advanced to the Semifinals. The third placed teams from each group competed in the 5th/6th placement match.

=== Group I ===
Pos	Team	Pld	W	D	L	GF	GA	GD	Pts	Qualification
1	France	5	4	0	1	128	121	+7	8	Semifinals
2	South Korea	5	3	0	2	158	151	+7	6	Semifinals
3	Spain	5	2	1	2	139	138	+1	5	Fifth place game
4	Russia	5	2	1	2	129	129	0	5	
5	Serbia and Montenegro	5	2	0	3	145	158	−13	4	
6	Austria	5	1	0	4	149	151	−2	2	

- Tuesday, 9 December:
  - Spain 27 - 26 Austria
  - Serbia and Montenegro 31 - 27 Russia
  - France 25 - 27 South Korea
- Wednesday, 10 December:
  - Russia 25 - 25 Spain
  - Austria 25 - 28 France
  - South Korea 33 - 35 Serbia and Montenegro
- Thursday, 11 December:
  - Serbia and Montenegro 27 - 38 Austria
  - Spain 29 - 32 South Korea
  - France 20 - 19 Russia

=== Group II in Rijeka ===
Pos	Team	Pld	W	D	L	GF	GA	GD	Pts	Qualification
1	Hungary	5	3	1	1	154	129	+25	7	Semifinals
2	Ukraine	5	3	1	1	132	140	−8	7	Semifinals
3	Norway	5	3	1	1	142	133	+9	7	Fifth place game
4	Slovenia	5	2	0	3	137	149	−12	4	
5	Romania	5	1	1	3	135	140	−5	3	
6	Germany	5	1	0	4	134	143	−9	2	

- Tuesday, 9 December:
  - Norway 31 - 30 Germany
  - Romania 27 - 30 Hungary
  - Ukraine 26 - 25 Slovenia
- Wednesday, 10 December:
  - Hungary 24 - 24 Norway
  - Germany 23 - 25 Ukraine
  - Slovenia 30 - 28 Romania
- Thursday, 11 December:
  - Romania 31 - 23 Germany
  - Norway 29 - 28 Slovenia
  - Ukraine 23 - 35 Hungary

== Final round ==
In Zagreb

Semifinal
13 December - 16:00
France	28
Ukraine	26
13 December - 19:15
Hungary	40
South Korea	38

Final
14 December - 19:15
France (ET)	32
Hungary	29
Bronze Match
14 December - 16:00
Ukraine	29
South Korea	31

5th/6th place
1	Spain	27
2	Norway	26

== Ranking and statistics ==
=== Final ranking ===
Gold medal	France
Silver medal	Hungary
Bronze medal	South Korea
4	Ukraine
5	Spain
6	Norway
7	Russia
8	Slovenia
9	Serbia and Montenegro
10	Romania
11	Austria
12	Germany
13	Denmark
14	Croatia
15	Czech Republic
16	Japan
17	Angola
18	Tunisia
19	China
20	Brazil
21	Ivory Coast
22	Argentina
23	Australia
24	Uruguay

2003 Women's World Champions

France
First Title

Team roster

Stéphanie Cano, Joanne Dudziak, Myriame Said Mohamed, Isabelle Cendier Ajaguin, Sophie Herbrecht, Estelle Vogein, Leila Lejeune, Isabelle Wendling, Sandrine Delerce, Myriam Borg-Korfanty, Mélinda Jacques-Szabo, Stéphanie Ludwig, Nodjialem Myaro, Valérie Nicolas, Véronique Pecqueux-Rolland, Raphaëlle Tervel.
Head coach: Olivier Krumbholz.

=== All Star Team ===
- Goalkeeper: Valérie Nicolas (FRA)
- Left wing: Tanja Oder (SLO)
- Left back: Olena Tsyhytsia (UKR)
- Pivot: Isabelle Wendling (FRA)
- Centre back: Anita Görbicz (HUN)
- Right back: Bojana Radulović (HUN)
- Right wing: Woo Sun-Hee (KOR)

=== Top Goalkeepers ===
Rank	Name	Team	%	Saves	Shots
1	Joanne Dudziak	France	47%	57	122
2	Heidi Tjugum	Norway	46%	66	145
3	Cecilie Leganger	Norway	43%	89	207
3	Lene Rantala	Denmark	43%	21	49
5	Katalin Pálinger	Hungary	42%	141	336
6	Tatiana Alizar	Russia	41%	58	141
7	Ildiko Barbu	Romania	40%	34	84
7	Irina Sirina	Hungary	40%	30	75
9	Luminita Dinu	Romania	39%	93	239
9	Valérie Nicolas	France	39%	103	262

=== Top goalscorers ===
Rank	Name	Team	Goals	Shots	%
1	Bojana Radulović	Hungary	97	170	57%
2	Olena Tsyhytsia	Ukraine	66	120	55%
3	Bojana Petrović	Serbia and Montenegro	58	104	56%
4	Susana Fraile Celaya	Spain	50	116	43%
5	Zsuzsanna Lovasz	Hungary	48	68	71%
6	Montserrat Puche Díaz	Spain	47	84	56%
7	Grit Jurack	Germany	46	90	51%
8	Woo Sun-Hee	South Korea	45	75	60%
9	Ausra Fridrikas	Austria	45	82	55%
10	Elodie Mambo	Ivory Coast	43	86	50%

=== Statistics ===
The total average number of shots and throws taken in the preliminary round was 51.79 with a shot efficacy of 52.46%. The greatest efficacy was acquired by shots at the goal line (70%). Teams won on average 4.58 penalty (7m) throws. The winning teams took on average 3.55 shots more that the defeated teams. Defeated teams were also 17.98% less efficient than the winning ones, not only in goal-scoring but also in number and efficacy of the fast breaks and assists.

== Medalists ==
Gold	Silver	Bronze
France: Stéphanie Cano; Joanne Dudziak; Myriame Said Mohamed; Isabelle Cendier Ajaguin; Sophie Herbrecht; Estelle Vogein; Leila Lejeune; Isabelle Wendling; Sandrine Delerce; Myriam Borg-Korfanty; Mélinda Jacques-Szabo; Stéphanie Ludwig; Nodjialem Myaro; Valérie Nicolas; Véronique Pecqueux-Rolland; Raphaëlle Tervel Head coach : Mr. Olivier Krumbholz	Hungary: Irina Sirina; Bernadett Ferling; Beáta Bohus; Ibolya Mehlmann; Erika Kirsner; Hortenzia Szrnka; Bojana Radulovics; Krisztina Pigniczki; Ágnes Farkas; Tímea Sugár; Anita Görbicz; Eszter Siti; Katalin Pálinger; Tímea Tóth; Zsuzsanna Lovász; Anita Kulcsár Head coach : Mr. Lajos Mocsai	South Korea: Oh Yong-ran; Woo Sun-hee; Huh Soon-young; Lee Gong-joo; Jang So-hee; Kim Cha-youn; Oh Seong-ok; Huh Young-sook; Moon Kyeong-ha; Lim O-kyeong; Park Jung-hee; Lee Sang-eun; Lee Min-hee; Myoung Bok-hee; Choi Im-jeong; Moon Pil-hee Head coach : ?

== Literature ==
- Ohnjec, Katarina; Vuleta, Dinko; Milanović, Dragan; Gruić, Igor (2008). "Performance indicators of teams at the 2003 World handball championship for women in Croatia" (PDF). Kinesiology. 40 (1): 69-79. ISSN 1331-1441.
