= Cristina López (handballer) =

Spanish handball player (born 1975)

Personal information
- Nationality: Spanish
- Born: 8 July 1975 (age 51) Cádiz, Spain

Sport
- Sport: Handball
National team
- Years: Team
- –: Spain

Cristina López (born 8 July 1975) is a Spanish handball player.

She was born in Cádiz, Spain. She competed at the 2004 Summer Olympics, where Spain finished 6th.
