= Stéphanie Ludwig =

French handball player (born 1972)

Personal information
- Nationality: French
- Born: 29 November 1972 (age 53) Casablanca, Morocco
- Height: 171 cm (67 in)

Sport
- Sport: Handball
- Position: left wing

Youth career
- Years: Team
- 1983-1988: ASPTT Bar-le-Duc
- 1988-1991: Bordeaux Étudiants Club

Senior clubs
- Years: Team
- 1991-1992: Bordeaux Étudiants Club
- 1992-1996: Stade béthunois handball
- 1996-1998: AS Bondy
- 1998-2002: ASPTT Metz
- 2002-2003: Ferrobus Mislata
- 2003-2004: ASPTT Metz
- 2004-2006: ESC Yutz HB
- 2006-2007: HB Plan de Cuques
- 2007-2013: Case Cressonnière
National team
Years	Team	Apps	(Gls)
1995-??	France	153	(320)
Medal record
Women's handball
Representing France
World Championship
Gold medal – first place	2003 Croatia	Team
Silver medal – second place	1999 Denmark/Norway	Team
European Championship
Bronze medal – third place	2002 Denmark	Team
Mediterranean Games
Gold medal – first place	1997 Bari	Team
Gold medal – first place	2001 Tunis	Team

Stéphanie Ludwig (born 29 November 1972) is a French handball player. She was part of the French team that won gold medals at the 2003 World Women's Handball Championship.

She was born in Casablanca, Morocco.

== Career ==
Ludwig started playing handball at Bar-le-Duc when she was 10. Her first senior club was Béthunois BL, where she made her debut in 1992. Her biggest achievement here was finishing second in the 1994-95 season. She then joined AS Bondy in 1996. In 1998 she joined Metz Handball. Here she won the French championship four times; in 1999, 2000, 2002 and 2004 and the French cup in 1999. She then joined Spanish club Ferrobus Mislata for a season, before returning to Metz Handball. Her last professional clubs were ESC Yutz followed by a single season at Handball Plan de Cuques. From 2007 to 2013 she played lower league handball at Case Cressonnière.

== National team ==
Ludwig made her debut for the French national team in 1995. In 1999 she won her first medals with the French team at the 1999 World Championship. She competed at the 2000 Summer Olympics, when the French team finished 6th. At the 2002 European Championship she won bronze medals. At the 2003 World Women's Handball Championship she won a gold medal.
