= Isabelle Cendier Ajaguin =

French team handball player (born 1977)

Sonia Cendier Ajaguin
Personal information
- Full name: Isabelle Cendier Ajaguin
- Nationality: French
- Born: 22 May 1977 (age 49) Le Port, Réunion
- Height: 172 cm (68 in)

Sport
- Sport: Handball
- Position: Back
- Current club: Retired

Youth career
- Years: Team
- 1990-1996: AS Saint-Gilles les Hauts

Senior clubs
- Years: Team
- 1996-2000: Toulouse Féminin Handball
- 2000-2007: Metz Handball
- 2007-2009: Yutz
- 2009-2010: Toulouse Féminin Handball
- 2010-2011: Bruguières OC 31
National team
Years	Team	Apps	(Gls)
1999-2004	France	98	(188)
Medal record
Representing France
World Championship
Gold medal – first place	2003 Croatia	Team
Silver medal – second place	1999 Denmark/Norway	Team
Mediterranean Games
Gold medal – first place	2001 Tunis	Team

Isabelle "Sonia" Cendier Ajaguin (born 22 May 1977) is a French team handball player. In 2003 she won the World Championship with France. She competed at the 2000 Summer Olympics in Sydney, where the French team placed sixth. She also competed at the 2004 Summer Olympics in Athens, where France placed fourth.

== Career ==
Cendier started playing handball at the age of 13 at Saint-Gilles on Réunion. In 1996 she joined Toulouse Féminin HB. After three seasons she was promoted to the top division LFH Division 1 Féminine with the team. In 2000 she joined Metz Handball, one of the dominating teams in France. Here she won the French Championship 5 times and the League Cup three times. In 2007 she joined Yutz in the second tier. In 2009 she rejoined Toulouse Feminin HB. In 2011 she retired.

She debuted for the French national team in 1999 in a match against Ukraine.

Her first name is legally Isabelle, but she goes by Sonia.
