= Melanie Schliecker =

German handball player (born 1974)

Personal information
- Born: 26 January 1974 (age 52) Stade, West Germany
- Height: 173 cm (68 in)

Sport
- Sport: Handball
- Position: Right wing / pivot

Senior clubs
- Years: Team
- –1993: VfL Horneburg
- 1993–2006: Buxtehuder SV
- 2006–2013: SG Handball Rosengarten
- 2015–2018: VfL Stade
National team
Years	Team	Apps	(Gls)
–	Germany	114	(220)

Melanie Wagner (née Melanie Schliecker 26 January 1974) is a German former handball player. She competed in the women's tournament at the 1996 Summer Olympics.

She also participated in the 2002 European Women's Handball Championship.
