= Myriam Korfanty =

French handball player (born 1978)

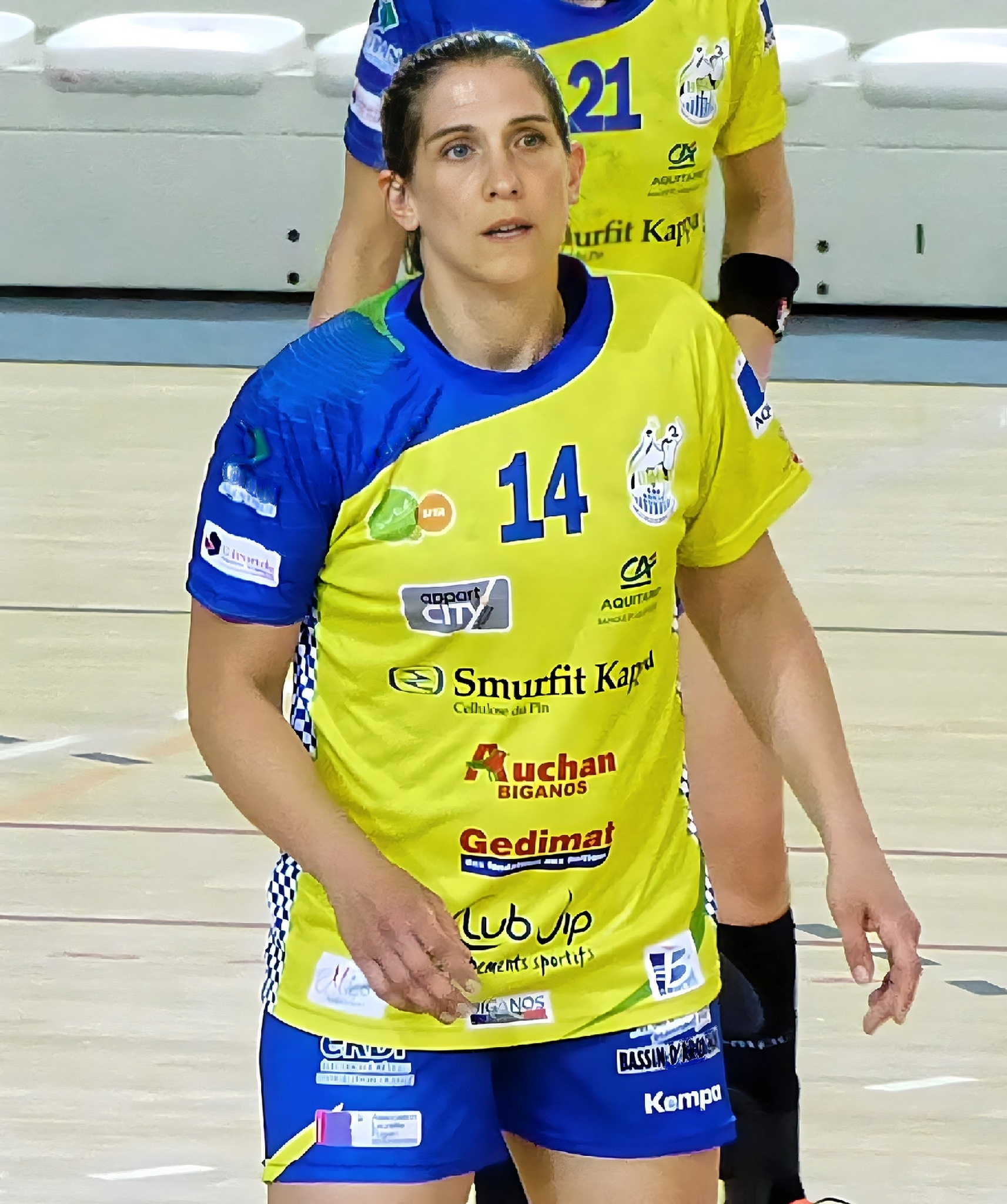
- Myriam Borg in 2014

Personal information
- Full name: Myriam Borg-Korfanty
- Nationality: French
- Born: 18 October 1978 (age 48) Pessac, France
- Height: 180 cm (71 in)

Sport
- Sport: Handball
- Position: Centre back
- Current club: Retired

Senior clubs
- Years: Team
- 1986-2000: US Mios
- 2000-2003: Mérignac Handball
- 2003-2012: US Mios-Biganos
- 2012-2013: CA Béglais
- 2014-2015: US Mios-Biganos-Bègles
- 2016-2019: US Mios-Biganos
National team
Years	Team	Apps	(Gls)
1997-2008	France	165	(261)
Medal record
Women's handball
Representing France
World Championship
Gold medal – first place	2003 Croatia	Team
European Championship
Bronze medal – third place	2002 Denmark	Team
Mediterranean Games
Gold medal – first place	2001 Tunis	Team
- Updated on 22 March 2023

Myriam Korfanty (born 18 October 1978), also known as Myriam Borg or Myriam Borg-Korfanty, is a French team handball player. She competed at the 2000 Summer Olympics in Sydney, where the French team placed sixth. She also competed at the 2004 Summer Olympics in Athens, where France placed fourth.

She retired in 2019 after having played for US Mios-Biganos in the third highest tier since 2016.
