= Estelle Vogein =

French handball player (born 1976)

Personal information
- Nationality: French
- Born: 3 April 1976 (age 50) Metz
- Height: 170 cm (67 in)

Sport
- Sport: Handball
- Position: Right wing

Youth career
- Years: Team
- –: Marly

Senior clubs
- Years: Team
- 1993-2006: ASPTT Metz
National team
Years	Team	Apps	(Gls)
1995-2005	France	105	(151)
Medal record
World Championship
Gold medal – first place	2003 Croatia	Team

Estelle Vogein (born 1976) is a French team handball player. At the 2003 World Championship, she won gold medals with the French team. She also competed at the 2004 Summer Olympics in Athens, where France placed fourth.

She played her entire senior career for ASPTT Metz. Here she won 10 French championships and three French cups. When the club celebrated its 50 year anniversary, she was named the best Left wing in club history.
