= Sophie Herbrecht =

French handball player (born 1982)

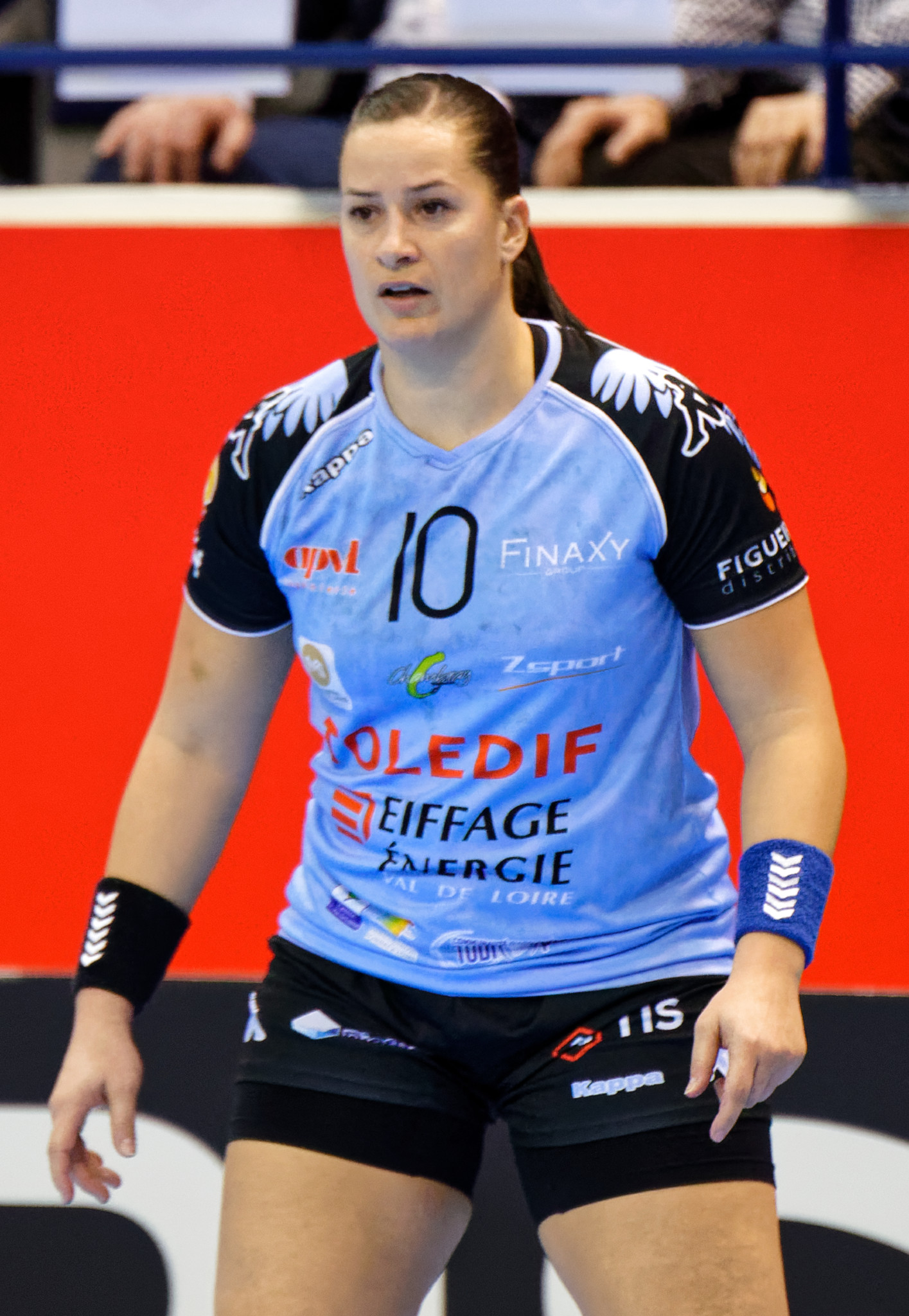
- Herbrecht in 2017

Personal information
- Nationality: French
- Born: 13 February 1982 (age 44) Mulhouse, France
- Height: 174 cm (69 in)

Sport
- Sport: Handball
- Position: Back
- Current club: Retired

Senior clubs
- Years: Team
- -1998: HBC Kingersheim
- 1998-2004: ES Besançon
- 2004-2006: Le Havre AC
- 2006-2009: Issy-les-Moulineaux Handball
- 2009-2010: Toulouse Feminin HB
- 2010-2012: HBC Nîmes
- 2012-2014: Toulon/Saint-Cyr
- 2014-2017: Chambray Touraine Handball
- 2017-2018: Brest Bretagne Handball
- 2018-2020: US Altkirch
National team
Years	Team	Apps	(Gls)
2001-2018	France	193	(569)

Teams managed
- 2020-2024: HBC Thann-Steinbach
- 2024-: ASCA Wittelsheim
Medal record
Representing France
Women's handball
World Championship
Gold medal – first place	2003 Croatia	Team
European Championship
Bronze medal – third place	2002 Denmark	Team
Bronze medal – third place	2006 Sweden	Team
- Updated on 2023

Sophie Herbrecht (born 13 February 1982) is a French retired handball player. She retired in 2020, playing for US Altkirch.

She became World Champion in 2003, when France won the 2003 World Championship in Croatia.

She represented France at the 2004 Summer Olympic Games in Athens, where the French team placed 4th, at the 2008 Summer Olympic Games in Beijing, where France placed 5th and at the 2012 Summer Olympics, where France also finished in 5th.
