= Myriame Saïd Mohamed =

French handball player (born 1977)

Personal information
- Nationality: French
- Born: 7 June 1977 (age 49) Lyon, France
- Height: 167 cm (66 in)

Sport
- Sport: Handball
- Position: Centre back

Youth career
- Years: Team
- 1991-1993: CO Saint-Fons
- 1993-1996: ASUL Vaulx

Senior clubs
- Years: Team
- 1996-2001: ASUL Vaulx-en-Velin
- 2001-2006: ES Besançon
- 2006-2008: CS Vesoul
- 2008-2010: Cercle Dijon Bourgogne HB
- 2010-2011: Santanders Marina Park
- 2011-2012: BM Elda Prestigio
National team
| Years | Team | Apps | (Gls) |
| 2000-2004 | France | 64 | (84) |
Medal record
World Championship
| Gold medal – first place | 2003 Croatia | Team |
European Championship
| Bronze medal – third place | 2002 Denmark | Team |

Myriame Saïd Mohamed (born 7 June 1977) is a French former handball player. She won the World Championship with France in 2003.

== Career ==
Saïd Mohamed started playing handball at CO Saint-Fons at the age of 14. Her first senior club was ASUL Vaulx-en-Velin from Lyon. In 2001 she signed her first professional contract with ES Besançon. In 2003 she won no less than 4 titles with the club; the French Championship, Cup, League Cup and the EHF Cup Winners' Cup. This was the first time a French club won a European title.

In 2006 she left ES Besançon and joined CS Vesoul. In the 2008 the team were relegated from the French league after finishing last, and Saïd Mohamed left for Cercle Dijon Bourgogne HB, where she played until 2010. She then left for Spain, where she played for Santander Marina Park and BM Elda Prestigio. She retired in 2012.

After her playing career she has been a coach at the French youth national team.

== National team ==
Saïd Mohamed played for the French youth team between 1996 and 1997. Between 2000 and 2004 she played 64 matches for the French national team. Her first major international tournament was the 2000 European Championship. Afterwards she played at the 2001 World Championship and the 2002 European Championship.

In 2003 she won the 2003 World Championship with France. This was the first time ever, that France became world champions.
