= Joanne Dudziak =

French handball player (born 1972)

Personal information
- Born: 8 June 1972 (age 54) Strasbourg, France
- Height: 170 cm (67 in)

Sport
- Sport: Handball
- Position: Goalkeeper
- Current club: Retired

Youth career
- Years: Team
- –: ASPTT Nice

Senior clubs
- Years: Team
- -1996: AL Bouillargues
- 1997-2000: HBC Nîmes
- 2000-2001: ES Besançon
- 2000-2001: HBC Nîmes
National team
- Years: Team
- –: France
Medal record
Women's handball
Representing France
World Championship
Gold medal – first place	2003 Croatia	Team
European Championship
Bronze medal – third place	2002 Denmark	Team
Mediterranean Games
Gold medal – first place	2001 Tunis	Team

Joanne Dudziak (born 8 June 1972 in Strasbourg) is a French handball goalkeeper. She has played for the Club HBC Nîmes and for the French national team.

She became World Champion in 2003, when France won the 2003 World Women's Handball Championship in Croatia.

She represented France at the 2000 Summer Olympics in Sydney, when France placed 6th, and at the 2004 Summer Olympics in Athens, where the French team placed 4th.
