= Valérie Nicolas =

French handball player (born 1975)

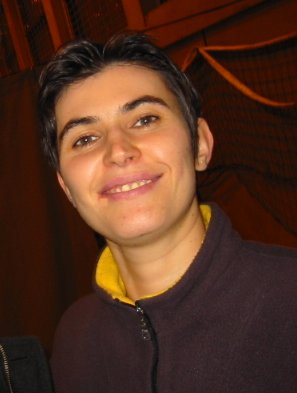

Personal information
- Born: 12 March 1975 (age 51) Lampaul-Guimiliau, France
- Height: 1.78 m (5 ft 10 in)

Sport
- Sport: Handball
- Position: Goalkeeper
- Current club: Retired

Senior clubs
- Years: Team
- 1993–1995: USM Gagny
- 1995–2003: ES Besançon
- 2003–2007: Viborg HK
- 2007–2008: Ikast/Bording EH
- 2008–2012: ASPTT Nice
National team
Years	Team	Apps	(Gls)
1995–2008	France	234	(0)
Medal record
Women's handball
Representing France
World Championship
Gold medal – first place	2003 Croatia	Team
Silver medal – second place	1999 Denmark/Norway	Team
European Championship
Bronze medal – third place	2002 Denmark	Team
Bronze medal – third place	2006 Sweden	Team
Mediterranean Games
Gold medal – first place	1997 Bari	Team
Gold medal – first place	2001 Tunis	Team

Valérie Nicolas (born 12 March 1975) is a French handball goalkeeper and former player of the French national team. She became World Champion in 2003 with the French team, and was also voted Most Valuable Player and Best Goalkeeper. She was voted into the All-Star Team in the 2007 World Championship. Among her other triumphs are a silver medal from the World Championships, two bronze medals from the European Championships, victories at the Champions League, the EHF Cup, the Cup Winners' Cup, and both French and Danish national championships.

She was included in the European Handball Federation Hall of Fame in 2023.

== Club career ==
Nicolas was born in Lampaul-Guimiliau, Finistère, and started her professional career in USM Gagny. From 1995 to 2003 she played for top club ES Besançon. With Besançon she won the French Championship in 1998 and in 2001, and the French Cup in 2001 and 2002. In 2003, she won the French Championship, the French Cup and the Cup Winners' Cup. After this successful season, she moved to Denmark to play for Viborg HK. She stayed at Viborg from 2003 to 2007, winning two Danish Championships (in 2004 and 2006), two Danish Cups, the Champions League in 2006 and the EHF Cup in 2004. She then played for Ikast/Bording EH one season, 2007/08, before returning to France to play for N2 (French fourth division) club ASPTT Nice.

== National team ==
Nicolas made her debut on the French national team in 1995. Until her retirement from the national team in 2008 (after the Summer Olympics), Valérie Nicolas played 234 international matches. In 1997, she finished 10th at the World Championship. She won a silver medal at the 1999 World Championship, after a final match between France and Norway in Lillehammer, which needed two overtimes to break the tie, ending 25-24 to Norway. In 2000, she finished 6th at the Olympics in Sydney and 5th at the European Championship. She finished fifth at the 2001 World Championship with the French team and won a bronze medal at the 2002 European Women's Handball Championship. She won a gold medal with the French team at the 2003 World Championship and was voted Most Valuable Player and All-Star Team goalkeeper at the championship. At the 2004 Summer Olympics in Athens, she finished fourth with the national team. She finished 12th at the 2005 World Championship in Russia and won a bronze medal at the 2006 European Women's Handball Championship. At the 2007 World Championship in France, where the French team placed fifth, her performance was recognised again, and she was selected as a member of the All-Star Team together with her Ikast teammates Gro Hammerseng and Katja Nyberg. She competed at the 2008 Summer Olympics in Beijing, where the French team finished fifth, and she ranked joint second on the Top Goalkeepers list with a 40% save rate.

== Honours ==
=== Results ===
- Champions League

Winner: 2006

- EHF Cup

Winner: 2004

- EHF Cup Winners' Cup

Winner: 2003

- French Championship

Winner: 1998, 2001, 2003

- French Cup

Winner: 2001, 2002, 2003

- Danish Championship

Gold: 2004, 2006
Silver: 2007, 2008

- Danish Cup

Winner: 2004/05, 2006/07

=== Awards ===
- MVP and member of the All Star Team of the 2003 World Championship
- Member of the All Star Team of the 2007 World Championship
- EHF Hall of Fame in 2023.
