= Melinda Jacques =

French handball player (born 1971)

Personal information
- Nationality: French, Hungarian
- Born: 13 October 1971 (age 55) Karcag, Hungary
- Height: 189 cm (74 in)

Sport
- Sport: Handball
- Position: Right back
- Current club: Retired

Youth career
- Years: Team
- –: Eger
- –: Györi Richards
- –1990: Secotex Szegeg

Senior clubs
- Years: Team
- 1990–1991: Secotex Szegeg
- 1991–1998: Vasas SC
- 1998–2004: Metz Handball
National team
| Years | Team | Apps | (Gls) |
| 1988–1998 | Hungary | 116 | (306) |
| 2000–2004 | France | 68 | (292) |
Medal record
World Championship
| Gold medal – first place | 2003 Croatia | Team |
European Championship
| Bronze medal – third place | 2002 Denmark | Team |

Melinda Jacques (née Szabó; former Melinda Tóthné Szabó; born 13 October 1971) is a Hungarian born French handball player. Internationally, she represented both Hungary and France. With the latter she won the 2003 World Championship and won a bronze medal at the 2002 European Women's Handball Championship.

== Career ==
She started played handball at the club Hungarian Eger, followed by Győri Richards and then Secotex Szegeg, where she made her senior debut.

She played her first match for the Hungarian national team at the age of 17.

In 1991 she joined Vasas SC, where she won the Hungarian Championship in 1992 and 1993, and reached the final of the 1993-94 Champions League, where they lost to Austrian Hypo Niederösterreich. She also won silver medals at the 1995 EHF City Cup, where they lost to Russian Rotor Volgograd.

She represented Hungary at the 1993 World Women's Handball Championship, where they finished 7th. Her last tournament with Hungary was the 1997 World Championship, where Hungary got 9th place.

In 1998 she joined the French club Metz, where she played until 2004, where she retired. With Metz she won the French Championship in 1999, 2000, 2002, 2004 and the French Cup in 1999.

In 2000 she optained French citizenship, and was called up for the 2000 Summer Olympics for France, but she missed the tournament due to a thigh injury. Her first official match for France was at the 2000 European Women's Handball Championship, where she made the tournament all-star team, when France finished 5th.

Two years later she won a bronze medal at the 2002 European Women's Handball Championship, losing to Norway in the semifinal and beating Russia in the third place play-off.

The following year she was part of the French team that won the 2003 World Women's Handball Championship, beating her native Hungary in the final.

She competed at the 2004 Summer Olympics, where France finished 4th by losing to South Korea in the semifinal and to Ukraine in the third place play-off.

== Titles ==
- Silver - EHF Champions League 1994 - Vasas SC
- Silver - EHF City Cup 1995 - Vasas SC
- Silver - Hungarian Cup 1992 and 1993 - Vasas SC
- Gold - Hungarian Championship 1992 and 1993 - Vasas SC
- Gold - French Championship 1999, 2000, 2002 and 2004 - Metz
- Gold - French Cup 1999 - Metz

== Private life ==
Her daughter is Emma Jacques, also handball player, and plays the same position.
