= Raphaëlle Tervel =

French handball player (born 1979)

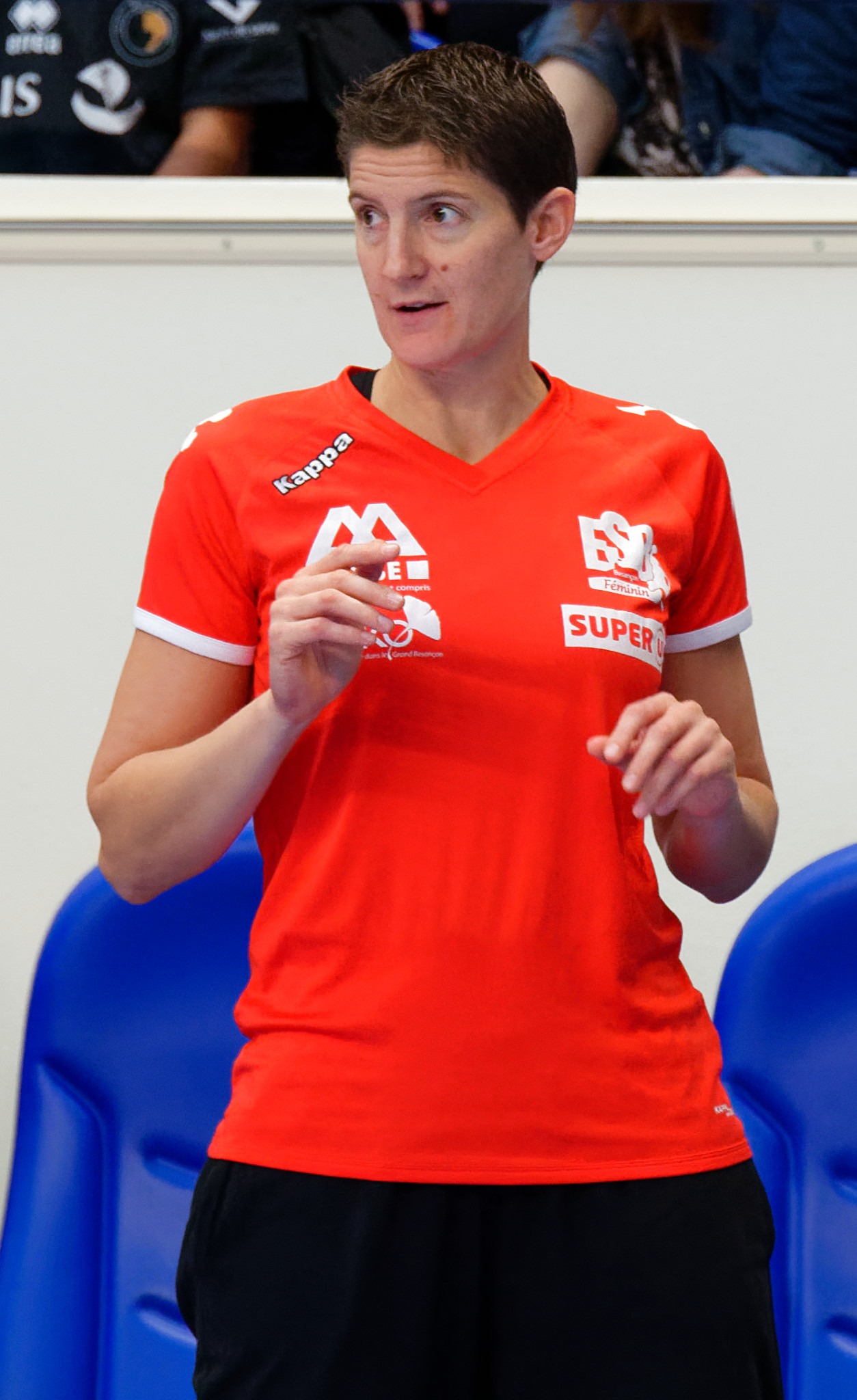

Personal information
- Full name: Raphaëlle Tervel
- Nationality: French
- Born: 21 April 1979 (age 47) Besançon, France
- Height: 1.79 m (5 ft 10 in)

Sport
- Sport: Handball
- Position: Left wing

Senior clubs
- Years: Team
- 1996–2006: ESBF Besançon
- 2006–2009: BM Bera Bera
- 2009–2010: Larvik HK
- 2010–2012: SD Itxako
- 2012–2014: Győri ETO KC
- 2022: Győri ETO KC
National team
Years	Team	Apps	(Gls)
1998–2012	France	249	(372)

Teams managed
- 2014–2021: ESBF Besançon
- 2022–2023: Győri ETO KC (assistant)
- 2024–: Brest Bretagne Handball
Medal record
World Championship
Gold medal – first place	2003 Croatia	Team
Silver medal – second place	2009 China	Team
Silver medal – second place	2011 Brazil	Team
European Championship
Bronze medal – third place	2002 Denmark	Team
Bronze medal – third place	2006 Sweden	Team

Raphaëlle Tervel (born 21 April 1979) is a former French handballer and current head coach of Brest Bretagne Handball. She was born in Besançon.

She made her debut with the national team in 1998. She won gold medals with the French team at the 2003 World Women's Handball Championship in Croatia. She competed at the Summer Olympics in 2000, 2004, 2008 and 2012. She also participated at the 2009 World Women's Handball Championship in China, winning a silver medal with the French team.

Raphaëlle won the EHF Women's Champions League with Győri Audi ETO KC in 2013 and 2014 then she retired.

She returned to handball court in 2022 as a player-coach at Győri Audi ETO KC, after a lot of injuries in the team.
