= 2005 World Women's Handball Championship squads =

List of handball players

The following squads and players competed in the World Women's Handball Championship in 2005 in Russia, Saint Petersburg.

== Angola ==
1. Cristina Branco
2. Marta Joaquiem
3. Ilda Bengue
4. Belina Miguel
5. Filomena Trindade
6. Bombo Calandula
7. Maria Goncalves
8. Nair Almeida
9. Isabel Fernandes
10. Marcelina Kiala
11. Maria Pedro
12. Anica Neto
13. Justina Praca
14. Cilizia Tavares
15. Elzira Tavares
16. Lourdes Monteiro

Coach: Jeronimo Neto

== Argentina ==
1. Maria Celeste Mena
2. Melisa Bok
3. Maricel Bueno
4. Georgina Constantino
5. Mariana Sanguinetti
6. Magdalena Decilio
7. Pilar Romero
8. Gisele Leis
9. Natacha Melillo
10. Bibiana Ferrea
11. Cynthia Basile
12. Valentina Kogan
13. Lucia Fernandez
14. Solange Tagliavini
15. Patricia Ces
16. Maria Emilia Acosta

Coach: Giselle Pintos

== Australia ==
1. Megan Miller
2. Shelley Roy
3. Olivia Doherty
4. Katia Boyd
5. Belinda Griffiths
6. Lilly Maher
7. Katherina Napier
8. Raelene Boulton
9. Courtney Gahan
10. Caitlin Wynne
11. Catherine Kent
12. Michelle Rossoukas
13. Meaghan Gurr
14. Kimberly Tennant
15. Rosalie Boyd
16. Simone Montie

Coach: Geoffrey Latta

== Austria ==
1. Natalia Rusnatchenko
2. Ariane Maier
3. Ljiljana Paras
4. Monika Richter
5. Laura Magelinskas
6. Sorina Teodorovic
7. Marina Budecevic
8. Elisabeth Herbst
9. Isabel Plach
10. Sabrina Thurner
11. Petra Blazek
12. Katrin Engel
13. Tatjana Logvin
14. Gabriela Rotis Nagy
15. Simona Spiridon
16. Katharina Reingruber

Coach: Herbert Müller

== Brazil ==
1. Channa Masson de Souza
2. Alexandra do Nascimento
3. Fabiana Kuestner
4. Silvia Araujo Pinheiro
5. Daniela de Oliveira Piedade
6. Alessandra Medeiros de Oliveira
7. Tayra Rodrigues
8. Millene Brune Figueiredo
9. Vivianne Rodigues Jacques
10. Jacqueline Oliveira Santana
11. Lucila da Silva
12. Juceli Sales da Rosa
13. Aline da Silva
14. Idalina Borges Mesquita
15. Aline dos Santos
16. Francine de Moraes

Coach: Juan Oliver

== Cameroon ==
1. Laurentine Balilumin
2. Celestine Nyestok A Ebeng
3. Forsuh Perpetua Lemnwie
4. Emilienne Ady Dipoko
5. Ursula Ngoh Mbah
6. Carole Nanda Kouakam
7. Nicole Magne Kenmogoe
8. Kermine Ngo Kaldjop
9. Marthe Virginie Eke Bissono
10. Agata Aurore Dooh Soppo Oho
11. Evelyne Madjotah Tapfou
12. Labelle Kun Nguidjol
13. Honoree Kaldjop
14. Loualine Shuri Ndeh
15. Marguerita Tchagam
16. Jacqueline Mossy Solle

Coach: Pascal Teufack

== China ==
1. Liu Guini
2. Liu Yun
3. Zhang Hongli
4. Yu Le
5. Huang Dongjie
6. Wang Chanchan
7. Wang Min
8. Wang Shasha
9. Zhang Zhiqing
10. Huang Hong
11. Wu Yanan
12. Liu Xiaomei
13. Sun Laimiao
14. Yu Geli
15. Wu Wenjuan
16. Li Weiwei

Coach: Kim Gap-soo

== Croatia ==
1. Barbara Stancin
2. Miranda Tatari
3. Ivanka Hrgovic
4. Maja Cop
5. Dijana Golubic
6. Maida Arslanagic
7. Nikica Pusic
8. Maja Koznjak
9. Jelena Grubisic
10. Lidija Horvat
11. Svitlana Pasicnik
12. Ivana Jelcic
13. Marija Popovic
14. Kristina Franic
15. Ljerka Vresk
16. Antonela Pensa

Coach: Ratko Balenovic

== Denmark ==
1. Ditte Andersen
2. Jane Wangsöe
3. Rikke Nielsen
4. Kristina Bille-Hansen
5. Mette Sjøberg
6. Mette Vestergaard
7. Louise Mortensen
8. Rikke Hørlykke
9. Lene Lund Nielsen
10. Karin Mortensen
11. Lise Knudsen
12. Katrine Fruelund
13. Rikke Schmidt
14. Lene Thomsen
15. Karen Brødsgaard
16. Josephine Touray

Coach: Jan Pytlick

== France ==
1. Stéphanie Lambert
2. Nina Kamto Njitam
3. Amelie Goudjo
4. Angelique Spincer
5. Paule Baudouin
6. Sophie Herbrecht
7. Stella Joseph-Matthieu
8. Isabelle Wendling
9. Myriam Korfanty
10. Sabrina Legenty
11. Valérie Nicolas
12. Sandy Demangeon
13. Alissa Gomis
14. Christine Vanparys-Torres
15. Raphaelle Tervel
16. Laurence Maho

Coach: Olivier Krumbholz

== Germany ==
1. Sabine Englert
2. Clara Woltering
3. Alexandra Gräfer
4. Anne Müller
5. Anna Loerper
6. Nadine Krause
7. Sabrina Neukamp
8. Mariella Bohm
9. Silke Meier
10. Anja Althaus
11. Susanne Henze
12. Stefanie Melbeck
13. Nina Wörz
14. Nora Reiche
15. Nadine Härdter
16. Grit Jurack

Coach: Armin Emrich

== Hungary ==
1. Katalin Pálinger
2. Tímea Sugár
3. Beatrix Balogh
4. Mónika Kovacsicz
5. Ibolya Mehlmann
6. Ágnes Hornyák
7. Rita Borbás
8. Cecília Őri
9. Bernadett Ferling
10. Anita Görbicz
11. Eszter Siti
12. Tímea Tóth
13. Gabriella Szűcs
14. Gabriella Kindl
15. Orsolya Vérten
16. Fanni Kenyeres

Coach: András Németh

== Ivory Coast ==
1. Rufine Lobouo
2. Candido Zazan
3. Alimata Dosso
4. Elodie Mambo
5. Celine Dongo
6. Nathalie Kregbo
7. Julie Toualy
8. Robeace Abogny
9. Sandrine Douhou
10. Mari Josee Guibi
11. Edwige Zadi
12. Adeline Koudou
13. Laurette Bodua
14. Fatoumata Diomande
15. Elisabeth Sokouri
16. Christiane Guede

Coach: Julienne Mme Akpa

== Japan ==
1. Mami Tanaka
2. Yuko Arihama
3. Mariko Komatsu
4. Mao Higuchi
5. Mineko Tanaka
6. Natsuki Takei
7. Akiko Kinjo
8. Hitomi Sakugawa
9. Tomoko Sakamoto
10. Naomi Nakamura
11. Aiko Hayafune
12. Kimiko Hida
13. Keiko Mizuno
14. Noriko Omae
15. Hisyao Taniguchi
16. Yakari Asai

Coach: Bert Bouwer

== Macedonia ==
1. Olga Kolesnik
2. Robertina Mecevska
3. Natasa Kocevska
4. Anzela Platon Dimovska
5. Olga Bujanova
6. Klara Boeva
7. Valentina Radulovic
8. Lence Ilkova
9. Alexandra Ristovska
10. Semra Radoncik
11. Natalija Todorovska
12. Julija Portjanko
13. Biljana Crvenkoska
14. Tanja Andrejeva
15. Elena Gjorgjijevska
16. Mirjeta Bajramoska

Coach: Andrij Portnoj

== Netherlands ==
1. Marieke van der Wal
2. Jokelyn Tienstra
3. Debbie Klijn
4. Diane Roelofsen
5. Saskia Mulder
6. Evelien van der Koelen
7. Miranda Robben
8. Joyce Hilster
9. Arjenne Paap
10. Andrea Groot
11. Diane Lamein
12. Natasja Burgers
13. Maura Visser
14. Irina Pusic
15. Silvia Hofman
16. Pearl van der Wissel

Coach: Sjors Röttger

== Norway ==
1. Terese Pedersen
2. Ragnhild Aamodt
3. Anette Hovind Johansen
4. Randi Gustad
5. Karoline Dyhre Breivang
6. Kristine Lunde
7. Kari Mette Johansen
8. Kjersti Beck
9. Linn Jørum Sulland
10. Camilla Thorsen
11. Katrine Lunde
12. Marianne Rokne
13. Tonje Nøstvold
14. Isabell Blanco

Coach: Marit Breivik

== Poland ==
1. Sabina Kubisztal
2. Iwona Blaszkowska
3. Iwona Szafulska
4. Joanna Dworaczyk
5. Magdalena Milot
6. Ewa Damiecka
7. Dagmara Kowalska
8. Hanna Strzalkowska
9. Karolina Siodmiak
10. Kinga Polenz
11. Iwona Lacz
12. Karolina Kudlacz
13. Agatha Wypych
14. Magdalena Chemicz
15. Sabina Wlodek
16. Marzena Kot

Coach: Zygfryd Kuchta

== Romania ==
1. Tereza Tamas
2. Ramona Maier
3. Oana Soit
4. Raluca Ivan
5. Roxana Gatzel
6. Ana Maria Lazer
7. Aurelia Bradeanu
8. Ionela Gilca
9. Paula Radulescu
10. Cristina Varzaru
11. Steluta Luca
12. Valentina Nelli Ardean Elisei
13. Luminita Dinu
14. Simona Gogirla
15. Mihaela Tivadar
16. Narcisa Lecusanu

Coach: Gheorghe Tadici

== Russia ==
1. Tatiana Alizar
2. Polina Vyakhireva
3. Oxana Romenskaya
4. Liudmila Postnova
5. Anna Kareeva
6. Liudmila Bodnieva
7. Yana Uskova
8. Yelena Polenova
9. Emilia Turey
10. Elena Sergeeva
11. Natalia Shipilova
12. Maria Sidorova
13. Ekaterina Marennikova
14. Irina Bliznova
15. Anna Kurepta
16. Irina Poltoratskaya

Coach: Evgeny Trefilov

== Slovenia ==
1. Urska Wertl
2. Nina Potočnik
3. Mojca Dercar
4. Deja Doler
5. Mihaela Ciora
6. Mia Bosnjak
7. Vesna Pus
8. Nataliya Derepasko
9. Katja Kurent Tatarovac
10. Tanja Cigoja
11. Sergeja Stefanišin
12. Manuela Hrnjic
13. Barbara Gorski
14. Tatjana Oder
15. Martine Strmsek
16. Anja Frešer

Coach: Robert Begus

== South Korea ==
1. Son Min Ji
2. Woo Sun Hee
3. Huh Soon Young
4. Lee Gong Joo
5. Song Hai Rim
6. Kim Eun Jung
7. Kim Cha Youn
8. Huh Young Sook
9. Moon Kyeong Ha
10. Yoo Hyun Ji
11. Kim Jin Soon
12. Lee Min Hee
13. Myoung Bok Hee
14. Kang Ji Hey
15. Choi Im Jeong
16. Moon Pil Hee

Coach: Kang Tae Ko

== Ukraine ==
1. Viktoriya Tymoshenkova
2. Oksana Sakada
3. Tetyana Shynkarenko
4. Maryna Vergelyuk
5. Olena Iatsenko
6. Ganna Siukalo
7. Olena Radchenko
8. Regina Shymkute
9. Iryna Shybanova
10. Olena Reznir
11. Tetiana Vorozhtsova
12. Nataliya Lyapina
13. Anastasiya Borodina
14. Mariya Boklashchuk
15. Maria Makarenko
16. Iryna Shutska

Coach: Leonid Ratner

== Uruguay ==
1. Magdalena Gutierrez
2. Claudia Porteiro
3. Soledad Faedo
4. Lucia Miranda
5. Eliana Falco
6. Paola Lucas
7. Fabiana Sencion
8. Cecilia Saiz
9. Alejandra Sencion
10. Ivanna Scavino
11. Paula Gambera
12. Jussara Castro
13. Victoria Grana
14. Maria Noel Uriarte
15. Alejandra Ferrari
16. Ximena Diaz

Coach: Gonzalo Peluffo
