= 2004 European Women's Handball Championship squads =

The following squads and players competed in the European Women's Handball Championship in 2004 in Hungary.

== Austria ==
1. Nataliya Rusnatchenko
2. Elisabeth Herbst
3. Petra Blazek
4. Sylvia Strass
5. Katharina Reingruber
6. Birgit Engl
7. Stephanie Ofenböck
8. Sorina Teodorovic
9. Marina Budecevic
10. Simona Spiridon
11. Barbara Strass
12. Katrin Engel
13. Tatjana Logvin
14. Gabriela Eugenia Rotis-Nagy

== Belarus ==
1. Natallia Petrakova
2. Alena Abramovich
3. Alesya Safonova
4. Natallia Artsiomenka
5. Raisa Tsikhanovich
6. Hanna Sukhamirava
7. Iryna Artsiomenka
8. Hanna Stsiapanava
9. Volha Kandratsyeva
10. Krystsina Svatko
11. Volha Kryuko
12. Tatsiana Khlimankova
13. Alesia Kurchankova
14. Natallia Maylichka
15. Natalia Platanovich

== Czech Republic ==
1. Kristyna Selicharova
2. Vendula Ajglova
3. Iva Zamorska
4. Lucie Fabikova
5. Lenka Kysucanova
6. Martina Knytlova
7. Simona Roubinkova
8. Jana Fischerova
9. Martina Saskova
10. Lenka Flekova
11. Jana Arnosova
12. Petra Valova
13. Martina Jonasova
14. Jana Simerska
15. Alena Polaskova
16. Katerina Vaskova

== Croatia ==
1. Ana Krizanac
2. Ivana Jelcic
3. Miranda Tatari
4. Ivanka Hrgovic
5. Maja Cop Andesilic
6. Dijana Golubic
7. Zdenka Kruselj
8. Anita Gace
9. Maida Arslanagic
10. Nikica Pusic
11. Lidija Horvat
12. Marija Popovic
13. Maja Zebic
14. Marija Borozan
15. Tihana Ambros
16. Sandra Stojkovic
17. Ivana Petkovic

== Denmark ==
1. Karin Mortensen
2. Rikke Schmidt
3. Louise Bager Nørgaard
4. Rikke Erhardsen Skov
5. Henriette Rønde Mikkelsen
6. Anne Petersen
7. Laura Danielsen
8. Rikke Hørlykke Jørgensen
9. Camilla Thomsen
10. Lise Knudsen
11. Winnie Mølgaard
12. Mette Sjøberg
13. Karen Brødsgaard
14. Lene Tobiasen
15. Josephine Touray
16. Rikke Nielsen

== France ==
1. Maylis Bordenave
2. Stella Joseph-Mathieu
3. Mariama Signaté
4. Leila Duchemann Lejeune
5. Véronique Pecqueux-Rolland
6. Paule Baudouin
7. Sophie Herbrecht
8. Stéphanie Cano
9. Isabelle Wendling
10. Nina Kamto Njitam
11. Sabrina Legenty
12. Stéphanie Fiossonangaye
13. Christiane Vanparys-Torres
14. Raphaelle Tervel
15. Marie Vautherot
16. Bertile Betare

== Germany ==
1. Sabine Englert
2. Alexandra Gräfer
3. Nadine Härdter
4. Grit Jurack
5. Marion Erfmann
6. Nina Christin Wörz
7. Maren Baumbach
8. Susanne Henze
9. Nikola Pietzsch
10. Kathrin Blacha
11. Milica Danilovic
12. Heike Schmidt
13. Stefanie Melbeck
14. Anja Althaus
15. Daniela Harke
16. Clara Woltering

== Hungary ==
1. Katalin Pálinger
2. Irina Sirina
3. Zsuzsanna Lovász
4. Bojana Radulovics
5. Ibolya Mehlmann
6. Anita Kulcsár
7. Beáta Bohus
8. Bernadett Ferling
9. Eszter Siti
10. Anita Görbicz
11. Gabriella Kindl
12. Tímea Tóth
13. Gabriella Szűcs
14. Ivett Nagy
15. Beatrix Balogh
16. Krisztina Pigniczki

== Norway ==
1. Kjersti Beck
2. Katrine Lunde Haraldsen
3. Katja Nyberg
4. Ragnhild Margrethe Aamodt
5. Randi H. Gustad
6. Karoline Charlotte Dyhre Breivang
7. Kristine Lunde-Borgersen
8. Gro Hammerseng
9. Kari Mette Johansen
10. Elisabeth Hilmo
11. Camilla Nordberg Thorsen
12. Linn-Kristin Riegelhuth
13. Vigdis Haarsaker
14. Isabel Blanco
15. Göril Snorroeggen
16. Terese Pedersen

== Romania ==
1. Paula Claudia Radulescu
2. Luminita Hutupan Dinu
3. Ramona Petruta Farcau
4. Anisoara Durac
5. Carmen Lungu
6. Adina Olariu
7. Mihaela Ani Secocico
8. Aurelia Bradeanu
9. Madalina Simule
10. Oana Andreea Manea
11. Cristina Georgiana Varzaru
12. Valentina Neli Ardean Elisei
13. Simona Silvia Gogirla
14. Elena Avadanii
15. Roxana Gatzel
16. Ionica Munteanu
17. Ionela Gilca

== Russia ==
1. Tatiana Alizar
2. Maria Sidorova
3. Natalia Shipilova
4. Elena Sergeeva
5. Liudmila Postnova
6. Liudmila Bodnieva
7. Nadezda Muravyeva
8. Yana Uskova
9. Emiliya Turey
10. Anna Kurepta
11. Evgenia Rvacheva
12. Alina Dolgikh
13. Ekaterina Marennikova
14. Oksana Korolyova
15. Natalia Parshina

== Serbia and Montenegro ==
1. Jelena Savkovic
2. Ana Vojcic
3. Jelena Popovic
4. Ana Djokic
5. Mirjana Milenkovic
6. Andrijana Budimir
7. Maja Lojpur
8. Jelena Nisavic
9. Ana Batinic
10. Ana Milovanovic
11. Tanja Milanovic
12. Svetlana Ognjenovic
13. Marina Rokic
14. Ivana Milosevic
15. Katarina Bulatovic
16. Sladjana Djeric

== Slovenia ==
1. Sergeja Stefanisin
2. Barbara Gorski
3. Olga Ceckova
4. Anja Argenti
5. Mojca Dercar
6. Mihaela Ana Ciora
7. Silvana Ilic
8. Vesna Vincic-Pus
9. Nataliya Derepasko
10. Katja Kurent Tatarovac
11. Spela Cerar
12. Tanja Dajcman
13. Tatjana Oder
14. Anja Freser
15. Nadiza Plesko

== Spain ==
1. Elisabet Lopez Valledor
2. Maria Eugenia Sanchez Bravo
3. Soraya Garcia Leite
4. Susana Pareja Ibarra
5. Davinia Lopez Hernandez
6. Beatriz Morales Tendero
7. Marta Elisabet Mangue Gonzales
8. Macarena Aguilar Diaz
9. Rocio Guerola Galera
10. Patricia Alonso Jimenez
11. Isabel Maria Ortuno Torrico
12. Veronica Maria Cuadrado Dehesa
13. Noelia Oncina Morena
14. Aitziber Elejaga Vargas
15. Nelly Carla Alberto Fransisca
16. Lidia Sanchez Alias

== Sweden ==
1. Therese Brosson
2. Madelene Grundström
3. Helena Andersson
4. Kristina Linea Flognman
5. Matilda Linnea Boson
6. Anna Ljungdahl
7. Fanny Lagerström
8. Erika Nilsson
9. Asa Koensberg
10. Katarina Arfwidsson Chrifi
11. Jessica Enström
12. Sara Eriksson
13. Asa Elisabeth Eriksson
14. Johanna Aronsson
15. Maria Lindqvist
16. Sara Holmgren

== Ukraine ==
1. Nataliya Borysenko
2. Larysa Zaspa
3. Olena Reznir
4. Hanna Burmystrova
5. Tetyana Shynkarenko
6. Ganna Syukalo
7. Iryna Shutska Sheyenko
8. Lyudmyla Shevchenko
9. Vita Mukhina
10. Nataliya Datsenko Lyapina
11. Anastasiya Pidpalova Borodina
12. Anastasiya Sokol
13. Kateryna Valyushek
14. Mariya Boklaschuk
15. Olena Radchenko
16. Maria Makarenko
