= 2005 World Women's Handball Championship =

2005 edition of the World Women's Handball Championship

Tournament details
- Host country: Russia
- Venues: 3 (in 1 host city)
- Dates: 5–18 December
- Teams: 24 (from 5 confederations)

Final positions
- Champions: Russia (2nd title)
- Runners-up: Romania
- Third place: Hungary
- Fourth place: Denmark

Tournament statistics
- Matches played: 84
- Goals scored: 4,831 (57.51 per match)
- Top scorers: (Austria) Tatjana Logvin (Germany) Nadine Krause (60 goals each)

Awards
- Best player: (Russia) Lyudmila Bodniyeva

The 2005 World Women's Handball Championship, the 17th team handball world championship for women, was played in Saint Petersburg, Russia between 5 and 18 December 2005. Russia won their second title.

== Qualification ==
Competition	Dates	Host	Vacancies	Qualified
Host nation			1	Russia
2003 World Championship	2–14 December 2003	Croatia	1	France
2004 African Championship	9–18 April 2004	(Egypt) Cairo	3	Angola; Cameroon; Ivory Coast
2004 Asian Championship	23–25 July 2004	(Japan) Hiroshima	~~4~~ 3	Japan; China; South Korea; ~~Chinese Taipei~~
2004 European Championship	9–19 December 2004	Hungary	3	Norway; Denmark; Hungary
2005 Oceania Championship	24–28 May 2005	(Australia) Sydney	1	Australia
2005 Pan American Championship	25–29 May 2005	(Brazil) São Bernardo do Campo	3	Brazil; Argentina; Uruguay
European qualification	23 November 2004 – 18 June 2005	Various	8	Austria; Croatia; Macedonia; Netherlands; Poland; Romania; Slovenia; Ukraine
Reallocation			1	Germany

== Preliminary round ==
All times are local UTC+3.

=== Group A ===
Pos	Team	Pld	W	D	L	GF	GA	GD	Pts	Qualification
1	Russia (H)	5	5	0	0	176	110	+66	10	Main round
2	Netherlands	5	4	0	1	145	123	+22	8	Main round
3	Croatia	5	3	0	2	165	126	+39	6	Main round
4	China	5	2	0	3	154	146	+8	4	
5	Japan	5	1	0	4	152	155	−3	2	
6	Uruguay	5	0	0	5	73	205	−132	0	

Source: IHF
Rules for classification: 1) points; 2) head-to-head points; 3) head-to-head goal difference; 4) head-to-head number of goals scored; 5) goal difference.
(H) Hosts

5 December 2005; 16:00	Netherlands	29–27	Croatia	Ice Palace; Attendance: 500; Referees: Olesen, Pedersen (DEN)
5 December 2005; 16:00	van der Wissel 8	(17–11)	Pasičnik 6	Ice Palace; Attendance: 500; Referees: Olesen, Pedersen (DEN)
5 December 2005; 16:00		Report		Ice Palace; Attendance: 500; Referees: Olesen, Pedersen (DEN)

5 December 2005; 19:00	Russia	43–16	Uruguay	Ice Palace; Attendance: 1,000; Referees: Horáček, Novotný (CZE)
5 December 2005; 19:00	Shipilova, Turey 7	(25–8)	Miranda 6	Ice Palace; Attendance: 1,000; Referees: Horáček, Novotný (CZE)
5 December 2005; 19:00	3× (yellow card) 4× (suspension)	Report	3× (yellow card) 4× (suspension)	Ice Palace; Attendance: 1,000; Referees: Horáček, Novotný (CZE)

5 December 2005; 21:00	Japan	27–33	China	Ice Palace; Attendance: 300; Referees: Bord, Buy (FRA)
5 December 2005; 21:00	Tanaka 9	(18–14)	Li 11	Ice Palace; Attendance: 300; Referees: Bord, Buy (FRA)
5 December 2005; 21:00		Report		Ice Palace; Attendance: 300; Referees: Bord, Buy (FRA)

6 December 2005; 17:00	Uruguay	8–29	Netherlands	Ice Palace; Attendance: 250; Referees: Ljudovik, Vakula (UKR)
6 December 2005; 17:00	Castro, Scavino 2	(4–17)	Roelofsen 6	Ice Palace; Attendance: 250; Referees: Ljudovik, Vakula (UKR)
6 December 2005; 17:00		Report		Ice Palace; Attendance: 250; Referees: Ljudovik, Vakula (UKR)

6 December 2005; 19:00	China	20–36	Russia	Ice Palace; Attendance: 500; Referees: Olesen, Pedersen (DEN)
6 December 2005; 19:00	three players 4	(9–16)	Marennikova 7	Ice Palace; Attendance: 500; Referees: Olesen, Pedersen (DEN)
6 December 2005; 19:00	2× (yellow card) 5× (suspension)	Report	3× (yellow card) 5× (suspension)	Ice Palace; Attendance: 500; Referees: Olesen, Pedersen (DEN)

6 December 2005; 21:00	Croatia	31–30	Japan	Ice Palace; Attendance: 200; Referees: Muro, Rodríguez (ESP)
6 December 2005; 21:00	Golubić 10	(11–14)	Tanaka 8	Ice Palace; Attendance: 200; Referees: Muro, Rodríguez (ESP)
6 December 2005; 21:00		Report		Ice Palace; Attendance: 200; Referees: Muro, Rodríguez (ESP)

7 December 2005; 17:00	Japan	44–22	Uruguay	Ice Palace; Attendance: 200; Referees: Līcis, Stoļarovs (LAT)
7 December 2005; 17:00	three players 6	(24–10)	Castro 6	Ice Palace; Attendance: 200; Referees: Līcis, Stoļarovs (LAT)
7 December 2005; 17:00		Report		Ice Palace; Attendance: 200; Referees: Līcis, Stoļarovs (LAT)

7 December 2005; 19:00	Russia	34–22	Netherlands	Ice Palace; Attendance: 500; Referees: Gardinovački, Marić (SCG)
7 December 2005; 19:00	Bodniyeva 8	(16–10)	four players 4	Ice Palace; Attendance: 500; Referees: Gardinovački, Marić (SCG)
7 December 2005; 19:00	4× (yellow card) 8× (suspension)	Report	2× (yellow card) 4× (suspension)	Ice Palace; Attendance: 500; Referees: Gardinovački, Marić (SCG)

7 December 2005; 21:00	China	29–35	Croatia	Ice Palace; Attendance: 200; Referees: Ljudovik, Vakula (UKR)
7 December 2005; 21:00	Li 10	(16–18)	Pasičnik 12	Ice Palace; Attendance: 200; Referees: Ljudovik, Vakula (UKR)
7 December 2005; 21:00		Report		Ice Palace; Attendance: 200; Referees: Ljudovik, Vakula (UKR)

9 December 2005; 17:00	Netherlands	35–27	Japan	Ice Palace; Attendance: 200; Referees: Souza, Pereira (BRA)
9 December 2005; 17:00	van der Wissel 8	(19–13)	Kinjo, Tanaka 5	Ice Palace; Attendance: 200; Referees: Souza, Pereira (BRA)
9 December 2005; 17:00		Report		Ice Palace; Attendance: 200; Referees: Souza, Pereira (BRA)

9 December 2005; 19:00	Russia	29–28	Croatia	Ice Palace; Attendance: 1,500; Referees: Bord, Buy (FRA)
9 December 2005; 19:00	Bodniyeva 8	(18–16)	Pasičnik 9	Ice Palace; Attendance: 1,500; Referees: Bord, Buy (FRA)
9 December 2005; 19:00	3× (yellow card) 7× (suspension)	Report	3× (yellow card) 7× (suspension) 1× (red card)	Ice Palace; Attendance: 1,500; Referees: Bord, Buy (FRA)

9 December 2005; 21:00	Uruguay	18–45	China	Ice Palace; Attendance: 200; Referees: Doumbia, Gbela (CIV)
9 December 2005; 21:00	three players 4	(7–24)	Wang C. 8	Ice Palace; Attendance: 200; Referees: Doumbia, Gbela (CIV)
9 December 2005; 21:00		Report		Ice Palace; Attendance: 200; Referees: Doumbia, Gbela (CIV)

10 December 2005; 17:00	Netherlands	30–27	China	Ice Palace; Attendance: 300; Referees: Horáček, Novotný (CZE)
10 December 2005; 17:00	Hilster 7	(14–16)	Li 10	Ice Palace; Attendance: 300; Referees: Horáček, Novotný (CZE)
10 December 2005; 17:00		Report		Ice Palace; Attendance: 300; Referees: Horáček, Novotný (CZE)

10 December 2005; 19:00	Japan	24–34	Russia	Ice Palace; Attendance: 2,500; Referees: Karbaschi, Kohladouzan (IRI)
10 December 2005; 19:00	Kinjo 7	(8–17)	Polenova 8	Ice Palace; Attendance: 2,500; Referees: Karbaschi, Kohladouzan (IRI)
10 December 2005; 19:00	3× (yellow card) 4× (suspension)	Report	3× (yellow card) 6× (suspension)	Ice Palace; Attendance: 2,500; Referees: Karbaschi, Kohladouzan (IRI)

10 December 2005; 21:00	Croatia	44–9	Uruguay	Ice Palace; Attendance: 400; Referees: Souza, Pereira (BRA)
10 December 2005; 21:00	Pensa 9	(20–3)	Castro 4	Ice Palace; Attendance: 400; Referees: Souza, Pereira (BRA)
10 December 2005; 21:00		Report		Ice Palace; Attendance: 400; Referees: Souza, Pereira (BRA)

=== Group B ===
Pos	Team	Pld	W	D	L	GF	GA	GD	Pts	Qualification
1	Hungary	5	4	1	0	180	113	+67	9	Main round
2	South Korea	5	3	0	2	173	155	+18	6 (Note: South Korea 30–25 Norway)	Main round
3	Norway	5	3	0	2	155	112	+43	6	Main round
4	Slovenia	5	2	1	2	159	132	+27	5	
5	Angola	5	2	0	3	167	140	+27	4	
6	Australia	5	0	0	5	54	236	−182	0	

Source: IHF
Rules for classification: 1) points; 2) head-to-head points; 3) head-to-head goal difference; 4) head-to-head number of goals scored; 5) goal difference.
Notes:

5 December 2005; 17:00	Hungary	57–9	Australia	SCC Peterburgsky; Attendance: 100; Referees: Doumbia, Gbela (CIV)
5 December 2005; 17:00	Kenyeres 13	(27–5)	Roy 5	SCC Peterburgsky; Attendance: 100; Referees: Doumbia, Gbela (CIV)
5 December 2005; 17:00		Report		SCC Peterburgsky; Attendance: 100; Referees: Doumbia, Gbela (CIV)

5 December 2005; 19:00	Slovenia	42–35	South Korea	SCC Peterburgsky; Attendance: 100; Referees: Ljudovik, Vakula (UKR)
5 December 2005; 19:00	Derepasko 12	(20–18)	Kim C., Huh 7	SCC Peterburgsky; Attendance: 100; Referees: Ljudovik, Vakula (UKR)
5 December 2005; 19:00		Report		SCC Peterburgsky; Attendance: 100; Referees: Ljudovik, Vakula (UKR)

5 December 2005; 21:10	Norway	36–30	Angola	SCC Peterburgsky; Attendance: 100; Referees: Souza, Pereira (BRA)
5 December 2005; 21:10	Johansen, Rokne 8	(19–16)	Bengue, Tavares 8	SCC Peterburgsky; Attendance: 100; Referees: Souza, Pereira (BRA)
5 December 2005; 21:10		Report		SCC Peterburgsky; Attendance: 100; Referees: Souza, Pereira (BRA)

6 December 2005; 17:00	Australia	13–41	Slovenia	SCC Peterburgsky; Attendance: 100; Referees: Souza, Pereira (BRA)
6 December 2005; 17:00	Roy 5	(4–19)	Hrnjič 8	SCC Peterburgsky; Attendance: 100; Referees: Souza, Pereira (BRA)
6 December 2005; 17:00		Report		SCC Peterburgsky; Attendance: 100; Referees: Souza, Pereira (BRA)

6 December 2005; 19:00	Angola	30–34	Hungary	SCC Peterburgsky; Attendance: 100; Referees: Gardinovački, Marić (SCG)
6 December 2005; 19:00	Kiala 10	(17–14)	Görbicz 8	SCC Peterburgsky; Attendance: 100; Referees: Gardinovački, Marić (SCG)
6 December 2005; 19:00		Report		SCC Peterburgsky; Attendance: 100; Referees: Gardinovački, Marić (SCG)

6 December 2005; 21:00	South Korea	30–25	Norway	SCC Peterburgsky; Attendance: 250; Referees: Bord, Buy (FRA)
6 December 2005; 21:00	Moon P. 7	(11–13)	Breivang, Rokne 6	SCC Peterburgsky; Attendance: 250; Referees: Bord, Buy (FRA)
6 December 2005; 21:00		Report		SCC Peterburgsky; Attendance: 250; Referees: Bord, Buy (FRA)

7 December 2005; 17:00	Hungary	27–27	Slovenia	SCC Peterburgsky; Attendance: 100; Referees: Olesen, Pedersen (DEN)
7 December 2005; 17:00	Görbicz 7	(11–14)	Derepasko, Oder 7	SCC Peterburgsky; Attendance: 100; Referees: Olesen, Pedersen (DEN)
7 December 2005; 17:00		Report		SCC Peterburgsky; Attendance: 100; Referees: Olesen, Pedersen (DEN)

7 December 2005; 19:00	Angola	32–35	South Korea	SCC Peterburgsky; Attendance: 100; Referees: Karbaschi, Kohladouzan (IRI)
7 December 2005; 19:00	Kiala 12	(16–13)	Huh 11	SCC Peterburgsky; Attendance: 100; Referees: Karbaschi, Kohladouzan (IRI)
7 December 2005; 19:00		Report		SCC Peterburgsky; Attendance: 100; Referees: Karbaschi, Kohladouzan (IRI)

7 December 2005; 21:10	Norway	47–10	Australia	SCC Peterburgsky; Attendance: 100; Referees: Liachovičius, Paškevičius (LTU)
7 December 2005; 21:10	Nøstvold 10	(22–4)	Roy 4	SCC Peterburgsky; Attendance: 100; Referees: Liachovičius, Paškevičius (LTU)
7 December 2005; 21:10		Report		SCC Peterburgsky; Attendance: 100; Referees: Liachovičius, Paškevičius (LTU)

9 December 2005; 17:00	Australia	8–47	Angola	SCC Peterburgsky; Attendance: 100; Referees: Olesen, Pedersen (DEN)
9 December 2005; 17:00	three players 2	(5–26)	Almeida, Fernandes 7	SCC Peterburgsky; Attendance: 100; Referees: Olesen, Pedersen (DEN)
9 December 2005; 17:00		Report		SCC Peterburgsky; Attendance: 100; Referees: Olesen, Pedersen (DEN)

9 December 2005; 19:00	Hungary	42–29	South Korea	SCC Peterburgsky; Attendance: 300; Referees: Håkansson, Nilsson (SWE)
9 December 2005; 19:00	Mehlmann 10	(22–13)	Kim C. 6	SCC Peterburgsky; Attendance: 300; Referees: Håkansson, Nilsson (SWE)
9 December 2005; 19:00		Report		SCC Peterburgsky; Attendance: 300; Referees: Håkansson, Nilsson (SWE)

9 December 2005; 21:10	Slovenia	22–29	Norway	SCC Peterburgsky; Attendance: 300; Referees: Muro, Rodríguez (ESP)
9 December 2005; 21:10	Derepasko, Frešer 5	(10–16)	Aamodt, Rokne 5	SCC Peterburgsky; Attendance: 300; Referees: Muro, Rodríguez (ESP)
9 December 2005; 21:10		Report		SCC Peterburgsky; Attendance: 300; Referees: Muro, Rodríguez (ESP)

10 December 2005; 17:00	South Korea	44–14	Australia	SCC Peterburgsky; Attendance: 100; Referees: Doumbia, Gbela (CIV)
10 December 2005; 17:00	three players 6	(21–7)	Boyd, Roy 3	SCC Peterburgsky; Attendance: 100; Referees: Doumbia, Gbela (CIV)
10 December 2005; 17:00		Report		SCC Peterburgsky; Attendance: 100; Referees: Doumbia, Gbela (CIV)

10 December 2005; 19:00	Slovenia	27–28	Angola	SCC Peterburgsky; Attendance: 200; Referees: Liachovičius, Paškevičius (LTU)
10 December 2005; 19:00	Derepasko 7	(12–12)	Fernandes 6	SCC Peterburgsky; Attendance: 200; Referees: Liachovičius, Paškevičius (LTU)
10 December 2005; 19:00		Report		SCC Peterburgsky; Attendance: 200; Referees: Liachovičius, Paškevičius (LTU)

10 December 2005; 21:10	Norway	18–20	Hungary	SCC Peterburgsky; Attendance: 500; Referees: Ljudovik, Vakula (UKR)
10 December 2005; 21:10	Johansen 4	(9–6)	Görbicz 7	SCC Peterburgsky; Attendance: 500; Referees: Ljudovik, Vakula (UKR)
10 December 2005; 21:10		Report		SCC Peterburgsky; Attendance: 500; Referees: Ljudovik, Vakula (UKR)

=== Group C ===
Pos	Team	Pld	W	D	L	GF	GA	GD	Pts	Qualification
1	Denmark	5	4	0	1	168	139	+29	8 (Note: Denmark 27–26 Germany)	Main round
2	Germany	5	4	0	1	165	123	+42	8	Main round
3	Brazil	5	3	0	2	146	149	−3	6 (Note: Austria 29–32 Brazil)	Main round
4	Austria	5	3	0	2	158	147	+11	6	
5	Poland	5	1	0	4	136	154	−18	2	
6	Ivory Coast	5	0	0	5	118	179	−61	0	

Source: IHF
Rules for classification: 1) points; 2) head-to-head points; 3) head-to-head goal difference; 4) head-to-head number of goals scored; 5) goal difference.
Notes:

5 December 2005; 17:00	Austria	32–21	Ivory Coast	Yubileyny Sports Palace – Hall I Attendance: 100; Referees: Līcis, Stoļarovs (LAT)
5 December 2005; 17:00	Logvin 12	(18–7)	Dosso, Koudou 5	Yubileyny Sports Palace – Hall I Attendance: 100; Referees: Līcis, Stoļarovs (LAT)
5 December 2005; 17:00		Report		Yubileyny Sports Palace – Hall I Attendance: 100; Referees: Līcis, Stoļarovs (LAT)

5 December 2005; 19:00	Poland	21–33	Germany	Yubileyny Sports Palace – Hall I Attendance: 400; Referees: Hansen, Pettersen (NOR)
5 December 2005; 19:00	Kowalska 6	(12–16)	Krause 8	Yubileyny Sports Palace – Hall I Attendance: 400; Referees: Hansen, Pettersen (NOR)
5 December 2005; 19:00		Report		Yubileyny Sports Palace – Hall I Attendance: 400; Referees: Hansen, Pettersen (NOR)

5 December 2005; 21:00	Denmark	31–22	Brazil	Yubileyny Sports Palace – Hall I Attendance: 400; Referees: Liachovičius, Paškevičius (LTU)
5 December 2005; 21:00	Touray 7	(12–13)	Mesquita, dos Santos 6	Yubileyny Sports Palace – Hall I Attendance: 400; Referees: Liachovičius, Paškevičius (LTU)
5 December 2005; 21:00		Report		Yubileyny Sports Palace – Hall I Attendance: 400; Referees: Liachovičius, Paškevičius (LTU)

6 December 2005; 17:00	Brazil	34–31	Poland	Yubileyny Sports Palace – Hall I Attendance: 300; Referees: Håkansson, Nilsson (SWE)
6 December 2005; 17:00	Mesquita 8	(17–13)	Milot, Włodek 6	Yubileyny Sports Palace – Hall I Attendance: 300; Referees: Håkansson, Nilsson (SWE)
6 December 2005; 17:00		Report		Yubileyny Sports Palace – Hall I Attendance: 300; Referees: Håkansson, Nilsson (SWE)

6 December 2005; 19:00	Germany	34–27	Austria	Yubileyny Sports Palace – Hall I Attendance: 500; Referees: Poladenko, Chernega (RUS)
6 December 2005; 19:00	Jurack 8	(17–14)	Logvin 10	Yubileyny Sports Palace – Hall I Attendance: 500; Referees: Poladenko, Chernega (RUS)
6 December 2005; 19:00		Report		Yubileyny Sports Palace – Hall I Attendance: 500; Referees: Poladenko, Chernega (RUS)

6 December 2005; 21:00	Ivory Coast	21–42	Denmark	Yubileyny Sports Palace – Hall I Attendance: 400; Referees: Horáček, Novotný (CZE)
6 December 2005; 21:00	Mambo 8	(9–22)	Fruelund 7	Yubileyny Sports Palace – Hall I Attendance: 400; Referees: Horáček, Novotný (CZE)
6 December 2005; 21:00		Report		Yubileyny Sports Palace – Hall I Attendance: 400; Referees: Horáček, Novotný (CZE)

7 December 2005; 17:00	Poland	25–28	Austria	Yubileyny Sports Palace – Hall I Attendance: 200; Referees: Horáček, Novotný (CZE)
7 December 2005; 17:00	Kudłacz, Milot 5	(14–13)	Rotiș 12	Yubileyny Sports Palace – Hall I Attendance: 200; Referees: Horáček, Novotný (CZE)
7 December 2005; 17:00		Report		Yubileyny Sports Palace – Hall I Attendance: 200; Referees: Horáček, Novotný (CZE)

7 December 2005; 19:00	Brazil	34–26	Ivory Coast	Yubileyny Sports Palace – Hall I Attendance: 300; Referees: Hansen, Pettersen (NOR)
7 December 2005; 19:00	Jacques 6	(17–14)	Mambo 10	Yubileyny Sports Palace – Hall I Attendance: 300; Referees: Hansen, Pettersen (NOR)
7 December 2005; 19:00		Report		Yubileyny Sports Palace – Hall I Attendance: 300; Referees: Hansen, Pettersen (NOR)

7 December 2005; 21:00	Denmark	27–26	Germany	Yubileyny Sports Palace – Hall I Attendance: 600; Referees: Muro, Rodríguez (ESP)
7 December 2005; 21:00	Fruelund 7	(12–14)	Krause 9	Yubileyny Sports Palace – Hall I Attendance: 600; Referees: Muro, Rodríguez (ESP)
7 December 2005; 21:00		Report		Yubileyny Sports Palace – Hall I Attendance: 600; Referees: Muro, Rodríguez (ESP)

9 December 2005; 17:00	Poland	31–26	Ivory Coast	Yubileyny Sports Palace – Hall I Attendance: 250; Referees: Liachovičius, Paškevičius (LTU)
9 December 2005; 17:00	Włodek 10	(13–17)	Mambo 8	Yubileyny Sports Palace – Hall I Attendance: 250; Referees: Liachovičius, Paškevičius (LTU)
9 December 2005; 17:00		Report		Yubileyny Sports Palace – Hall I Attendance: 250; Referees: Liachovičius, Paškevičius (LTU)

9 December 2005; 19:00	Germany	32–24	Brazil	Yubileyny Sports Palace – Hall I Attendance: 400; Referees: Gardinovački, Marić (SCG)
9 December 2005; 19:00	Krause, Wörz 6	(17–9)	Mesquita 8	Yubileyny Sports Palace – Hall I Attendance: 400; Referees: Gardinovački, Marić (SCG)
9 December 2005; 19:00		Report		Yubileyny Sports Palace – Hall I Attendance: 400; Referees: Gardinovački, Marić (SCG)

9 December 2005; 21:00	Austria	42–35	Denmark	Yubileyny Sports Palace – Hall I Referees: Herczeg, Südi (HUN)
9 December 2005; 21:00	Logvin 15	(23–17)	Hørlykke 6	Yubileyny Sports Palace – Hall I Referees: Herczeg, Südi (HUN)
9 December 2005; 21:00		Report		Yubileyny Sports Palace – Hall I Referees: Herczeg, Südi (HUN)

10 December 2005; 17:00	Austria	29–32	Brazil	Yubileyny Sports Palace – Hall I Attendance: 250; Referees: Muro, Rodríguez (ESP)
10 December 2005; 17:00	Logvin 15	(16–13)	do Nascimento 9	Yubileyny Sports Palace – Hall I Attendance: 250; Referees: Muro, Rodríguez (ESP)
10 December 2005; 17:00		Report		Yubileyny Sports Palace – Hall I Attendance: 250; Referees: Muro, Rodríguez (ESP)

10 December 2005; 19:00	Ivory Coast	24–40	Germany	Yubileyny Sports Palace – Hall I Attendance: 350; Referees: Guseva, Vartanian (RUS)
10 December 2005; 19:00	Dosso, Mambo 5	(10–19)	Althaus, Neukamp 7	Yubileyny Sports Palace – Hall I Attendance: 350; Referees: Guseva, Vartanian (RUS)
10 December 2005; 19:00		Report		Yubileyny Sports Palace – Hall I Attendance: 350; Referees: Guseva, Vartanian (RUS)

10 December 2005; 21:00	Denmark	33–28	Poland	Yubileyny Sports Palace – Hall I Attendance: 500; Referees: Poladenko, Chernega (RUS)
10 December 2005; 21:00	Mortensen 7	(16–11)	Włodek 7	Yubileyny Sports Palace – Hall I Attendance: 500; Referees: Poladenko, Chernega (RUS)
10 December 2005; 21:00		Report		Yubileyny Sports Palace – Hall I Attendance: 500; Referees: Poladenko, Chernega (RUS)

=== Group D ===
Pos	Team	Pld	W	D	L	GF	GA	GD	Pts	Qualification
1	Romania	5	5	0	0	168	109	+59	10	Main round
2	Ukraine	5	3	1	1	156	126	+30	7	Main round
3	France	5	3	0	2	144	110	+34	6	Main round
4	Macedonia	5	2	1	2	149	122	+27	5	
5	Argentina	5	1	0	4	79	150	−71	2	
6	Cameroon	5	0	0	5	103	182	−79	0	

Source: IHF
Rules for classification: 1) points; 2) head-to-head points; 3) head-to-head goal difference; 4) head-to-head number of goals scored; 5) goal difference.

5 December 2005; 16:30	Ukraine	34–23	Cameroon	Yubileyny Sports Palace – Hall II; Attendance: 200; Referees: Karbaschi, Kohladouzan (IRI)
5 December 2005; 16:30	Reznir 10	(18–10)	Bissono 10	Yubileyny Sports Palace – Hall II; Attendance: 200; Referees: Karbaschi, Kohladouzan (IRI)
5 December 2005; 16:30		Report		Yubileyny Sports Palace – Hall II; Attendance: 200; Referees: Karbaschi, Kohladouzan (IRI)

5 December 2005; 18:30	Romania	31–15	Argentina	Yubileyny Sports Palace – Hall II; Attendance: 250; Referees: Poladenko, Chernega (RUS)
5 December 2005; 18:30	Ardean-Elisei 7	(17–7)	Acosta, Decilio 4	Yubileyny Sports Palace – Hall II; Attendance: 250; Referees: Poladenko, Chernega (RUS)
5 December 2005; 18:30		Report		Yubileyny Sports Palace – Hall II; Attendance: 250; Referees: Poladenko, Chernega (RUS)

5 December 2005; 20:30	France	25–22	Macedonia	Yubileyny Sports Palace – Hall II; Attendance: 250; Referees: Herczeg, Südi (HUN)
5 December 2005; 20:30	Spincer 8	(9–13)	Radulović 10	Yubileyny Sports Palace – Hall II; Attendance: 250; Referees: Herczeg, Südi (HUN)
5 December 2005; 20:30		Report		Yubileyny Sports Palace – Hall II; Attendance: 250; Referees: Herczeg, Südi (HUN)

6 December 2005; 16:30	Cameroon	19–50	Romania	Yubileyny Sports Palace – Hall II; Attendance: 250; Referees: Līcis, Stoļarovs (LAT)
6 December 2005; 16:30	Lemnwie, Mbah 4	(8–26)	Gâlcă, Gogîrlă 7	Yubileyny Sports Palace – Hall II; Attendance: 250; Referees: Līcis, Stoļarovs (LAT)
6 December 2005; 16:30		Report		Yubileyny Sports Palace – Hall II; Attendance: 250; Referees: Līcis, Stoļarovs (LAT)

6 December 2005; 18:30	Macedonia	29–29	Ukraine	Yubileyny Sports Palace – Hall II; Attendance: 250; Referees: Hansen, Pettersen (NOR)
6 December 2005; 18:30	five players 5	(12–17)	Borodina 7	Yubileyny Sports Palace – Hall II; Attendance: 250; Referees: Hansen, Pettersen (NOR)
6 December 2005; 18:30		Report		Yubileyny Sports Palace – Hall II; Attendance: 250; Referees: Hansen, Pettersen (NOR)

6 December 2005; 20:30	Argentina	11–33	France	Yubileyny Sports Palace – Hall II; Attendance: 250; Referees: Doumbia, Gbela (CIV)
6 December 2005; 20:30	Sanguinetti 3	(4–13)	Spincer 7	Yubileyny Sports Palace – Hall II; Attendance: 250; Referees: Doumbia, Gbela (CIV)
6 December 2005; 20:30		Report		Yubileyny Sports Palace – Hall II; Attendance: 250; Referees: Doumbia, Gbela (CIV)

7 December 2005; 16:30	Ukraine	27–30	Romania	Yubileyny Sports Palace – Hall II; Attendance: 300; Referees: Herczeg, Südi (HUN)
7 December 2005; 16:30	Borodina, Shutska 6	(10–17)	Luca, Gogîrlă 7	Yubileyny Sports Palace – Hall II; Attendance: 300; Referees: Herczeg, Südi (HUN)
7 December 2005; 16:30		Report		Yubileyny Sports Palace – Hall II; Attendance: 300; Referees: Herczeg, Südi (HUN)

7 December 2005; 18:30	Macedonia	32–15	Argentina	Yubileyny Sports Palace – Hall II; Attendance: 300; Referees: Håkansson, Nilsson (SWE)
7 December 2005; 18:30	Boeva 13	(16–9)	Decilio 6	Yubileyny Sports Palace – Hall II; Attendance: 300; Referees: Håkansson, Nilsson (SWE)
7 December 2005; 18:30		Report		Yubileyny Sports Palace – Hall II; Attendance: 300; Referees: Håkansson, Nilsson (SWE)

7 December 2005; 20:30	France	33–17	Cameroon	Yubileyny Sports Palace – Hall II; Attendance: 150; Referees: Poladenko, Chernega (RUS)
7 December 2005; 20:30	Kamto 7	(14–9)	three players 3	Yubileyny Sports Palace – Hall II; Attendance: 150; Referees: Poladenko, Chernega (RUS)
7 December 2005; 20:30		Report		Yubileyny Sports Palace – Hall II; Attendance: 150; Referees: Poladenko, Chernega (RUS)

9 December 2005; 16:30	Cameroon	24–44	Macedonia	Yubileyny Sports Palace – Hall II; Attendance: 200; Referees: Horáček, Novotný (CZE)
9 December 2005; 16:30	Kouakam, Ndeh 5	(9–22)	Todorovska 21	Yubileyny Sports Palace – Hall II; Attendance: 200; Referees: Horáček, Novotný (CZE)
9 December 2005; 16:30		Report		Yubileyny Sports Palace – Hall II; Attendance: 200; Referees: Horáček, Novotný (CZE)

9 December 2005; 18:30	Ukraine	34–17	Argentina	Yubileyny Sports Palace – Hall II; Attendance: 100; Referees: Karbaschi, Kohladouzan (IRI)
9 December 2005; 18:30	Lyapina, Reznir 5	(15–11)	Decilio 4	Yubileyny Sports Palace – Hall II; Attendance: 100; Referees: Karbaschi, Kohladouzan (IRI)
9 December 2005; 18:30		Report		Yubileyny Sports Palace – Hall II; Attendance: 100; Referees: Karbaschi, Kohladouzan (IRI)

9 December 2005; 20:30	Romania	28–26	France	Yubileyny Sports Palace – Hall II; Attendance: 150; Referees: Hansen, Pettersen (NOR)
9 December 2005; 20:30	Várzaru 10	(16–11)	Herbrecht 6	Yubileyny Sports Palace – Hall II; Attendance: 150; Referees: Hansen, Pettersen (NOR)
9 December 2005; 20:30		Report		Yubileyny Sports Palace – Hall II; Attendance: 150; Referees: Hansen, Pettersen (NOR)

10 December 2005; 16:30	Argentina	21–20	Cameroon	Yubileyny Sports Palace – Hall II; Attendance: 150; Referees: Gardinovački, Marić (SCG)
10 December 2005; 16:30	Ferrea 4	(10–10)	Bissono 5	Yubileyny Sports Palace – Hall II; Attendance: 150; Referees: Gardinovački, Marić (SCG)
10 December 2005; 16:30		Report		Yubileyny Sports Palace – Hall II; Attendance: 150; Referees: Gardinovački, Marić (SCG)

10 December 2005; 18:30	Romania	29–22	Macedonia	Yubileyny Sports Palace – Hall II; Attendance: 300; Referees: Līcis, Stoļarovs (LAT)
10 December 2005; 18:30	Várzaru 7	(18–8)	Bujanova, Portjanko 6	Yubileyny Sports Palace – Hall II; Attendance: 300; Referees: Līcis, Stoļarovs (LAT)
10 December 2005; 18:30		Report		Yubileyny Sports Palace – Hall II; Attendance: 300; Referees: Līcis, Stoļarovs (LAT)

10 December 2005; 20:30	France	27–32	Ukraine	Yubileyny Sports Palace – Hall II; Attendance: 300; Referees: Håkansson, Nilsson (SWE)
10 December 2005; 20:30	Spincer 13	(14–14)	Reznir 11	Yubileyny Sports Palace – Hall II; Attendance: 300; Referees: Håkansson, Nilsson (SWE)
10 December 2005; 20:30		Report		Yubileyny Sports Palace – Hall II; Attendance: 300; Referees: Håkansson, Nilsson (SWE)

== Main round ==
=== Group I ===
Pos	Team	Pld	W	D	L	GF	GA	GD	Pts	Qualification
1	Russia (H)	5	5	0	0	156	132	+24	10	Semifinals
2	Hungary	5	4	0	1	159	138	+21	8	Semifinals
3	Netherlands	5	2	1	2	140	154	−14	5	Fifth-place game
4	South Korea	5	2	0	3	150	162	−12	4	Seventh-place game
5	Norway	5	1	1	3	132	131	+1	3	
6	Croatia	5	0	0	5	140	160	−20	0	

Source: IHF
Rules for classification: 1) points; 2) head-to-head points; 3) head-to-head goal difference; 4) head-to-head number of goals scored; 5) goal difference.
(H) Hosts

12 December 2005; 17:00	Croatia	26–27	Hungary	Ice Palace; Attendance: 300; Referees: Olesen, Pedersen (DEN)
12 December 2005; 17:00	Pasičnik, Tatari 6	(13–16)	Tóth 8	Ice Palace; Attendance: 300; Referees: Olesen, Pedersen (DEN)
12 December 2005; 17:00		Report		Ice Palace; Attendance: 300; Referees: Olesen, Pedersen (DEN)

12 December 2005; 19:00	Russia	32–27	South Korea	Ice Palace; Attendance: 1,500; Referees: Ljudovik, Vakula (UKR)
12 December 2005; 19:00	Bliznova 7	(17–13)	Song 6	Ice Palace; Attendance: 1,500; Referees: Ljudovik, Vakula (UKR)
12 December 2005; 19:00	3× (yellow card) 4× (suspension)	Report	3× (yellow card) 3× (suspension)	Ice Palace; Attendance: 1,500; Referees: Ljudovik, Vakula (UKR)

12 December 2005; 21:10	Netherlands	30–30	Norway	Ice Palace; Attendance: 1,000; Referees: Gardinovački, Marić (SCG)
12 December 2005; 21:10	Lamein, van der Wissel 6	(16–12)	Lunde 11	Ice Palace; Attendance: 1,000; Referees: Gardinovački, Marić (SCG)
12 December 2005; 21:10		Report		Ice Palace; Attendance: 1,000; Referees: Gardinovački, Marić (SCG)

13 December 2005; 17:00	South Korea	38–34	Croatia	Ice Palace; Attendance: 300; Referees: Souza, Pereira (BRA)
13 December 2005; 17:00	Huh 12	(20–19)	Pasičnik, Pušić 7	Ice Palace; Attendance: 300; Referees: Souza, Pereira (BRA)
13 December 2005; 17:00		Report		Ice Palace; Attendance: 300; Referees: Souza, Pereira (BRA)

13 December 2005; 19:00	Hungary	37–30	Netherlands	Ice Palace; Attendance: 800; Referees: Ljudovik, Vakula (UKR)
13 December 2005; 19:00	Görbicz, Mehlmann 7	(21–16)	Mulder, van der Wissel 6	Ice Palace; Attendance: 800; Referees: Ljudovik, Vakula (UKR)
13 December 2005; 19:00		Report		Ice Palace; Attendance: 800; Referees: Ljudovik, Vakula (UKR)

13 December 2005; 21:10	Norway	22–26	Russia	Ice Palace; Attendance: 2,500; Referees: Bord, Buy (FRA)
13 December 2005; 21:10	Rokne 6	(11–12)	Bliznova 6	Ice Palace; Attendance: 2,500; Referees: Bord, Buy (FRA)
13 December 2005; 21:10	3× (yellow card) 6× (suspension)	Report	4× (yellow card) 6× (suspension) 1× (red card)	Ice Palace; Attendance: 2,500; Referees: Bord, Buy (FRA)

15 December 2005; 17:00	Netherlands	29–26	South Korea	Ice Palace; Attendance: 800; Referees: Olesen, Pedersen (DEN)
15 December 2005; 17:00	Lamein, Pusic 5	(16–14)	Choi 6	Ice Palace; Attendance: 800; Referees: Olesen, Pedersen (DEN)
15 December 2005; 17:00		Report		Ice Palace; Attendance: 800; Referees: Olesen, Pedersen (DEN)

15 December 2005; 19:00	Russia	35–33	Hungary	Ice Palace; Attendance: 3,500; Referees: Hansen, Pettersen (NOR)
15 December 2005; 19:00	Polenova 11	(15–17)	Kovacsicz 9	Ice Palace; Attendance: 3,500; Referees: Hansen, Pettersen (NOR)
15 December 2005; 19:00	3× (yellow card) 5× (suspension)	Report	3× (yellow card) 4× (suspension) 1× (red card)	Ice Palace; Attendance: 3,500; Referees: Hansen, Pettersen (NOR)

15 December 2005; 21:10	Croatia	25–37	Norway	Ice Palace; Attendance: 1,000; Referees: Herczeg, Südi (HUN)
15 December 2005; 21:10	Golubić, Pasičnik 6	(12–18)	Rokne 9	Ice Palace; Attendance: 1,000; Referees: Herczeg, Südi (HUN)
15 December 2005; 21:10		Report		Ice Palace; Attendance: 1,000; Referees: Herczeg, Südi (HUN)

=== Group II ===
Pos	Team	Pld	W	D	L	GF	GA	GD	Pts	Qualification
1	Romania	5	5	0	0	163	141	+22	10	Semifinals
2	Denmark	5	3	1	1	137	128	+9	7	Semifinals
3	Germany	5	3	0	2	145	140	+5	6	Fifth place game
4	Brazil	5	2	0	3	147	153	−6	4	Seventh place game
5	Ukraine	5	1	1	3	145	147	−2	3	
6	France	5	0	0	5	121	149	−28	0	

Source: IHF
Rules for classification: 1) points; 2) head-to-head points; 3) head-to-head goal difference; 4) head-to-head number of goals scored; 5) goal difference.

12 December 2005; 17:00	Germany	32–26	France	SCC Peterburgsky; Attendance: 200; Referees: Hansen, Pettersen (NOR)
12 December 2005; 17:00	Krause 8	(18–13)	Herbrecht 7	SCC Peterburgsky; Attendance: 200; Referees: Hansen, Pettersen (NOR)
12 December 2005; 17:00		Report		SCC Peterburgsky; Attendance: 200; Referees: Hansen, Pettersen (NOR)

12 December 2005; 19:00	Brazil	33–35	Romania	SCC Peterburgsky; Attendance: 250; Referees: Poladenko, Chernega (RUS)
12 December 2005; 19:00	do Nascimento, Piedade 6	(15–17)	Gogîrlă 11	SCC Peterburgsky; Attendance: 250; Referees: Poladenko, Chernega (RUS)
12 December 2005; 19:00		Report		SCC Peterburgsky; Attendance: 250; Referees: Poladenko, Chernega (RUS)

12 December 2005; 21:00	Denmark	28–28	Ukraine	SCC Peterburgsky; Attendance: 250; Referees: Herczeg, Südi (HUN)
12 December 2005; 21:00	Fruelund 8	(13–17)	Borodina 9	SCC Peterburgsky; Attendance: 250; Referees: Herczeg, Südi (HUN)
12 December 2005; 21:00		Report		SCC Peterburgsky; Attendance: 250; Referees: Herczeg, Südi (HUN)

13 December 2005; 17:00	Romania	37–26	Germany	SCC Peterburgsky; Attendance: 200; Referees: Håkansson, Nilsson (SWE)
13 December 2005; 17:00	Ardean-Elisei 12	(20–14)	Jurack, Wörz 6	SCC Peterburgsky; Attendance: 200; Referees: Håkansson, Nilsson (SWE)
13 December 2005; 17:00		Report		SCC Peterburgsky; Attendance: 200; Referees: Håkansson, Nilsson (SWE)

13 December 2005; 19:00	Ukraine	32–33	Brazil	SCC Peterburgsky; Attendance: 250; Referees: Hansen, Pettersen (NOR)
13 December 2005; 19:00	Reznir 12	(16–17)	Mesquita 8	SCC Peterburgsky; Attendance: 250; Referees: Hansen, Pettersen (NOR)
13 December 2005; 19:00		Report		SCC Peterburgsky; Attendance: 250; Referees: Hansen, Pettersen (NOR)

13 December 2005; 21:00	France	19–22	Denmark	SCC Peterburgsky; Attendance: 350; Referees: Poladenko, Chernega (RUS)
13 December 2005; 21:00	Herbrecht, Kamto 4	(10–11)	Fruelund 6	SCC Peterburgsky; Attendance: 350; Referees: Poladenko, Chernega (RUS)
13 December 2005; 21:00		Report		SCC Peterburgsky; Attendance: 350; Referees: Poladenko, Chernega (RUS)

15 December 2005; 17:00	Brazil	35–23	France	SCC Peterburgsky; Attendance: 300; Referees: Håkansson, Nilsson (SWE)
15 December 2005; 17:00	da Silva 8	(19–14)	Spincer 5	SCC Peterburgsky; Attendance: 300; Referees: Håkansson, Nilsson (SWE)
15 December 2005; 17:00		Report		SCC Peterburgsky; Attendance: 300; Referees: Håkansson, Nilsson (SWE)

15 December 2005; 19:00	Germany	29–26	Ukraine	SCC Peterburgsky; Attendance: 400; Referees: Bord, Buy (FRA)
15 December 2005; 19:00	Jurack 7	(16–15)	Radchenko 7	SCC Peterburgsky; Attendance: 400; Referees: Bord, Buy (FRA)
15 December 2005; 19:00		Report		SCC Peterburgsky; Attendance: 400; Referees: Bord, Buy (FRA)

15 December 2005; 21:00	Denmark	29–33	Romania	SCC Peterburgsky; Attendance: 500; Referees: Gardinovački, Marić (SCG)
15 December 2005; 21:00	Sjøberg 6	(13–16)	Ardean-Elisei 8	SCC Peterburgsky; Attendance: 500; Referees: Gardinovački, Marić (SCG)
15 December 2005; 21:00		Report		SCC Peterburgsky; Attendance: 500; Referees: Gardinovački, Marić (SCG)

== Final round ==
=== Bracket ===
Semifinals
17 December
Russia	31
Denmark	24
17 December
Romania	26
Hungary	24

Final
18 December
Russia	28
Romania	23
Third place
18 December
Denmark	24
Hungary	27

=== Semifinals ===
17 December 2005; 15:30	Romania	26–24	Hungary	Ice Palace; Attendance: 4,000; Referees: Håkansson, Nilsson (SWE)
17 December 2005; 15:30	three players 4	(15–14)	Mehlmann 6	Ice Palace; Attendance: 4,000; Referees: Håkansson, Nilsson (SWE)
17 December 2005; 15:30	3× (yellow card) 6× (suspension)	Report	4× (yellow card) 3× (suspension)	Ice Palace; Attendance: 4,000; Referees: Håkansson, Nilsson (SWE)

17 December 2005; 18:00	Russia	31–24	Denmark	Ice Palace; Attendance: 7,000; Referees: Ljudovik, Vakula (UKR)
17 December 2005; 18:00	Poltoratskaya 7	(16–9)	Hørlykke 5	Ice Palace; Attendance: 7,000; Referees: Ljudovik, Vakula (UKR)
17 December 2005; 18:00	3× (yellow card) 8× (suspension)	Report	3× (yellow card) 6× (suspension)	Ice Palace; Attendance: 7,000; Referees: Ljudovik, Vakula (UKR)

=== Seventh-place game ===
17 December 2005; 13:00	South Korea	28–29	Brazil	Ice Palace; Attendance: 300; Referees: Hansen, Pettersen (NOR)
17 December 2005; 13:00	Huh 7	(14–15)	do Nascimento 10	Ice Palace; Attendance: 300; Referees: Hansen, Pettersen (NOR)
17 December 2005; 13:00	3× (yellow card) 4× (suspension)	Report	3× (yellow card) 5× (suspension)	Ice Palace; Attendance: 300; Referees: Hansen, Pettersen (NOR)

=== Fifth-place game ===
18 December 2005; 12:00	Netherlands	28–26	Germany	Ice Palace; Attendance: 1,000; Referees: Gardinovački, Marić (SCG)
18 December 2005; 12:00	Lamein 7	(17–12)	Jurack 9	Ice Palace; Attendance: 1,000; Referees: Gardinovački, Marić (SCG)
18 December 2005; 12:00	3× (yellow card) 6× (suspension)	Report	3× (yellow card) 3× (suspension)	Ice Palace; Attendance: 1,000; Referees: Gardinovački, Marić (SCG)

=== Bronze medal game ===
18 December 2005; 14:30	Denmark	24–27	Hungary	Ice Palace; Attendance: 4,500; Referees: Poladenko, Chernega (RUS)
18 December 2005; 14:30	Fruelund 7	(15–14)	Görbicz 7	Ice Palace; Attendance: 4,500; Referees: Poladenko, Chernega (RUS)
18 December 2005; 14:30	3× (yellow card) 2× (suspension)	Report	2× (yellow card) 5× (suspension)	Ice Palace; Attendance: 4,500; Referees: Poladenko, Chernega (RUS)

=== Final ===
18 December 2005; 17:00	Russia	28–23	Romania	Ice Palace; Attendance: 10,500; Referees: Bord, Buy (FRA)
18 December 2005; 17:00	Postnova 7	(17–12)	Ardean-Elisei 7	Ice Palace; Attendance: 10,500; Referees: Bord, Buy (FRA)
18 December 2005; 17:00	3× (yellow card) 6× (suspension)	Report	3× (yellow card) 5× (suspension)	Ice Palace; Attendance: 10,500; Referees: Bord, Buy (FRA)

== Final rankings ==
Gold medal	Russia
Silver medal	Romania
Bronze medal	Hungary
4	Denmark
5	Netherlands
6	Germany
7	Brazil
8	South Korea
9	Norway
10	Ukraine
11	Croatia
12	France
13	Austria
14	Slovenia
15	Macedonia
16	Angola
17	China
18	Japan
19	Poland
20	Argentina
21	Ivory Coast
22	Cameroon
23	Uruguay
24	Australia

== Statistics ==
=== Top goalscorers ===
Rank	Name	Team	Goals	Shots	%
1	Nadine Krause	Germany	60	107	56
1	Tatjana Logvin	Austria	60	94	64
3	Anita Görbicz	Hungary	56	101	55
4	Grit Jurack	Germany	55	102	54
5	Katrine Fruelund	Denmark	54	98	55
6	Idalina Mesquita	Brazil	53	83	64
6	Woo Sun-hee	South Korea	53	83	64
8	Svitlana Pasičnik	Croatia	52	95	55
8	Olena Reznir	Ukraine	52	92	57
10	Valentina Ardean-Elisei	Romania	51	80	64

Source: IHF

=== Top goalkeepers ===
Rank	Name	Team	%	Saves	Shots
1	Laurence Maho	France	48	38	80
2	Tatiana Alizar	Russia	45	80	182
3	Luminița Dinu	Romania	43	117	275
3	Katrine Lunde	Norway	43	74	174
5	Katalin Pálinger	Hungary	40	131	324
6	Olga Kolesnik	Macedonia	39	58	148
7	Tereza Tamaș	Romania	39	37	96
8	Barbara Gorski	Slovenia	38	27	71
8	Justina Praça	Angola	38	17	45
10	Nataliya Rusnachenko	Austria	37	75	202

Source: IHF

== All star team ==
- Goalkeeper: Luminiţa Dinu (ROU)
- Left wing: Valentina Ardean-Elisei (ROU)
- Left back: Pearl van der Wissel (NED)
- Centre back: Anita Görbicz (HUN)
- Right back: Grit Jurack (GER)
- Right wing: Woo Sun-hee (KOR)
- Pivot: Lyudmila Bodniyeva (RUS)

Source: IHF

== Medalists ==
Medalists are:

Gold	Silver	Bronze
Russia Tatiana Alizar; Polina Vyakhireva; Oksana Romenskaya; Liudmila Postnova; Anna Kareeva; Liudmila Bodnieva; Yana Uskova; Yelena Polenova; Emiliya Turey; Elena Slinvinskaya; Natalya Shipilova; Maria Sidorova; Ekaterina Marennikova; Irina Bliznova; Anna Kurepta; Irina Poltoratskaya Head coach Yevgeni Trefilov	Romania Tereza Tamaș; Ramona Maier; Oana Soit; Raluca Ivan; Roxana Gatzel; Ana Maria Lazer; Aurelia Brădeanu; Ionela Stanca-Gâlcă; Paula Rădulescu; Cristina Vărzaru; Steluța Luca; Valentina Ardean-Elisei; Luminița Dinu; Simona Gogîrlă; Mihaela Tivadar; Narcisa Lecușanu Head coach Gheorghe Tadici	Hungary Beatrix Balogh; Rita Borbás; Bernadett Ferling; Anita Görbicz; Ágnes Hornyák; Fanni Kenyeres; Gabriella Kindl; Mónika Kovacsicz; Ibolya Mehlmann; Cecilia Őri; Katalin Pálinger; Eszter Siti; Tímea Sugár; Gabriella Szűcs; Tímea Tóth; Orsolya Vérten Head coach András Németh
