= Pâslaru =

Pâslaru, meaning "felt shoemaker", is a Romanian surname. Notable people with the surname include:

- Eugen Pâslaru, Moldovan politician
- Margareta Pâslaru, Romanian-American singer and actress
- Tereza Pîslaru, Romanian handball player
