= 2006 European Women's Handball Championship =

2006 EHF European Women's Handball Championship

Tournament details
- Host country: Sweden
- Venues: 4 (in 4 host cities)
- Dates: 7–17 December
- Teams: 16 (from 1 confederation)

Final positions
- Champions: Norway (3rd title)
- Runners-up: Russia
- Third place: France
- Fourth place: Germany

Tournament statistics
- Matches played: 47
- Goals scored: 2,510 (53.4 per match)
- Top scorer(s): Nadine Krause (GER) (58 goals)

Awards
- Best player: Gro Hammerseng (NOR)

The 2006 EHF European Women's Handball Championship was held in Sweden from 7 to 17 December. It was won by Norway after beating Russia 27–24 in the final match.

This championship was also the European qualifying event for 2008 Olympics, and Norway earned a spot at the 2008 Games for being the European champion. If Norway also becomes the 2007 World champion, the 2nd place team will qualify for the Olympics. In addition, the 1 or 2 (if Europe finishes in the top 2 continents at the world championship) best ranked teams in this championship, which are outside top 7 at the world championship, will participate at the Olympic qualifying tournament.

== Venues ==
The European Championships will be held in the following cities:

- Skövde, Skövde Arena (Preliminary Group A)
- Malmö, Baltiska Hallen (Preliminary Group D)
- Gothenburg, Scandinavium (Preliminary Group B, Main Group 1)
- Stockholm, Hovet (Preliminary Group C, Main Group 2, Final Round)

== Qualification ==
Country	Qualified as	Previous appearances in tournament
Sweden	Host	4 (1994, 1996, 2002, 2004)
Norway	Semifinalist of 2004 European Championship	6 (1994, 1996, **1998**, 2000, 2002, **2004**)
Denmark	Semifinalist of 2004 European Championship	6 (**1994**, **1996**, 1998, 2000, **2002**, 2004)
Hungary	Semifinalist of 2004 European Championship	6 (1994, 1996, 1998, **2000**, 2002, 2004)
Russia	Semifinalist of 2004 European Championship	6 (1994, 1996, 1998, 2000, 2002, 2004)
Germany	Fifth place of 2004 European Championship	6 (1994, 1996, 1998, 2000, 2002, 2004)
Austria	Playoff winner	6 (1994, 1996, 1998, 2000, 2002, 2004)
Croatia	Playoff winner	3 (1994, 1996, 2004)
France	Playoff winner	3 (2000, 2002, 2004)
Macedonia	Playoff winner	2 (1998, 2000)
Netherlands	Playoff winner	2 (1998, 2002)
Poland	Playoff winner	2 (1996, 1998)
Serbia	Playoff winner	0 (Debut)
Slovenia	Playoff winner	2 (2002, 2004)
Spain	Playoff winner	3 (1998, 2002, 2004)
Ukraine	Playoff winner	6 (1994, 1996, 1998, 2000, 2002, 2004)

Note: Bold indicates champion for that year. Italic indicates host for that year.

== Draw ==
The draw was held on 6 July 2006 in Gothenburg, Sweden.

Pot 1	Pot 2	Pot 3	Pot 4
Norway; Denmark; Hungary; Russia	Germany; Ukraine; Serbia; Spain	Slovenia; Austria; France; Croatia	Sweden; Netherlands; Macedonia; Poland

== Competition format ==
- Preliminary round: 16 teams are divided into four groups. They play each other in a single round robin system, so each team plays three matches. A win is worth two points, while a draw is worth one point. The top three teams from each group advance to the main round.
- Main round: 12 teams are divided in two groups. They play against the teams they didn't play in the preliminary round, so each team plays 3 matches. All points from the preliminary round, except the points gained against the 4th place team in the preliminary group, are carried forward into the main round. Same round robin rules apply as in the preliminary round. Top 2 teams from each group advance to the Semifinals, while the third placed team from each group advances to the 5th-6th Place Play-off.
- Final round: 6 teams play in the final weekend of the championships. 3rd place teams from the main round play in the 5th-6th Place Play-off. Other teams play in the semifinals. Losers of the semifinals advance to the 3rd-4th Place Play-off, and winners advance to the Final.

== Preliminary round ==
=== Group A ===
Pos	Team	Pld	W	D	L	GF	GA	GD	Pts	Qualification
1	Hungary	3	3	0	0	107	72	+35	6	Main round
2	Austria	3	2	0	1	83	94	−11	4	Main round
3	Macedonia	3	1	0	2	72	81	−9	2	Main round
4	Serbia	3	0	0	3	77	92	−15	0	

Source: EHF
Rules for classification: 1) points; 2) head-to-head points; 3) head-to-head goal difference; 4) head-to-head number of goals scored; 5) goal difference.

7 December 2006; 18:00	Serbia	23–25	Macedonia	Arena Skövde, Skövde; Attendance: 500
7 December 2006; 18:00		(11–14)		Arena Skövde, Skövde; Attendance: 500
7 December 2006; 18:00		Report		Arena Skövde, Skövde; Attendance: 500

7 December 2006; 20:15	Hungary	42–23	Austria	Arena Skövde, Skövde; Attendance: 300
7 December 2006; 20:15		(15–12)		Arena Skövde, Skövde; Attendance: 300
7 December 2006; 20:15		Report		Arena Skövde, Skövde; Attendance: 300

8 December 2006; 18:00	Austria	32–27	Serbia	Arena Skövde, Skövde; Attendance: 700
8 December 2006; 18:00		(17–10)		Arena Skövde, Skövde; Attendance: 700
8 December 2006; 18:00		Report		Arena Skövde, Skövde; Attendance: 700

8 December 2006; 20:15	Macedonia	22–30	Hungary	Arena Skövde, Skövde; Attendance: 800
8 December 2006; 20:15		(10–16)		Arena Skövde, Skövde; Attendance: 800
8 December 2006; 20:15		Report		Arena Skövde, Skövde; Attendance: 800

10 December 2006; 15:00	Austria	28–25	Macedonia	Arena Skövde, Skövde; Attendance: 800
10 December 2006; 15:00		(15–15)		Arena Skövde, Skövde; Attendance: 800
10 December 2006; 15:00		Report		Arena Skövde, Skövde; Attendance: 800

10 December 2006; 17:15	Hungary	35–27	Serbia	Arena Skövde, Skövde; Attendance: 600
10 December 2006; 17:15		(16–10)		Arena Skövde, Skövde; Attendance: 600
10 December 2006; 17:15		Report		Arena Skövde, Skövde; Attendance: 600

=== Group B ===
Pos	Team	Pld	W	D	L	GF	GA	GD	Pts	Qualification
1	Norway	3	3	0	0	102	63	+39	6	Main round
2	Germany	3	2	0	1	83	77	+6	4	Main round
3	Poland	3	1	0	2	75	92	−17	2	Main round
4	Slovenia	3	0	0	3	80	108	−28	0	

Source: EHF
Rules for classification: 1) points; 2) head-to-head points; 3) head-to-head goal difference; 4) head-to-head number of goals scored; 5) goal difference.

7 December 2006; 17:00	Germany	30–20	Poland	Scandinavium, Gothenburg; Attendance: 2,243
7 December 2006; 17:00		(14–9)		Scandinavium, Gothenburg; Attendance: 2,243
7 December 2006; 17:00		Report		Scandinavium, Gothenburg; Attendance: 2,243

7 December 2006; 19:15	Norway	43–20	Slovenia	Scandinavium, Gothenburg; Attendance: 1,500
7 December 2006; 19:15		(19–9)		Scandinavium, Gothenburg; Attendance: 1,500
7 December 2006; 19:15		Report		Scandinavium, Gothenburg; Attendance: 1,500

8 December 2006; 17:00	Slovenia	30–31	Germany	Scandinavium, Gothenburg; Attendance: 3,420
8 December 2006; 17:00		(13–18)		Scandinavium, Gothenburg; Attendance: 3,420
8 December 2006; 17:00		Report		Scandinavium, Gothenburg; Attendance: 3,420

8 December 2006; 19:15	Poland	21–32	Norway	Scandinavium, Gothenburg; Attendance: 3,642
8 December 2006; 19:15		(12–18)		Scandinavium, Gothenburg; Attendance: 3,642
8 December 2006; 19:15		Report		Scandinavium, Gothenburg; Attendance: 3,642

10 December 2006; 14:15	Slovenia	30–34	Poland	Scandinavium, Gothenburg; Attendance: 4,072
10 December 2006; 14:15		(10–18)		Scandinavium, Gothenburg; Attendance: 4,072
10 December 2006; 14:15		Report		Scandinavium, Gothenburg; Attendance: 4,072

10 December 2006; 16:30	Norway	27–22	Germany	Scandinavium, Gothenburg; Attendance: 4,351
10 December 2006; 16:30		(15–9)		Scandinavium, Gothenburg; Attendance: 4,351
10 December 2006; 16:30		Report		Scandinavium, Gothenburg; Attendance: 4,351

=== Group C ===
Pos	Team	Pld	W	D	L	GF	GA	GD	Pts	Qualification
1	Russia	3	3	0	0	97	69	+28	6	Main round
2	Croatia	3	2	0	1	67	70	−3	4	Main round
3	Sweden (H)	3	1	0	2	57	69	−12	2	Main round
4	Ukraine	3	0	0	3	73	86	−13	0	

Source: EHF
Rules for classification: 1) points; 2) head-to-head points; 3) head-to-head goal difference; 4) head-to-head number of goals scored; 5) goal difference.
(H) Hosts

7 December 2006; 17:45	Russia	27–22	Croatia	Hovet, Stockholm; Attendance: 1,000; Referees: Förström, Mitrunen (FIN)
7 December 2006; 17:45	Yakovleva 5	(14–10)	Arslanagić 7	Hovet, Stockholm; Attendance: 1,000; Referees: Förström, Mitrunen (FIN)
7 December 2006; 17:45	2× (yellow card) 2× (suspension)	Report	4× (yellow card) 4× (suspension)	Hovet, Stockholm; Attendance: 1,000; Referees: Förström, Mitrunen (FIN)

7 December 2006; 20:15	Ukraine	18–22	Sweden	Hovet, Stockholm; Attendance: 2,516
7 December 2006; 20:15		(8–11)		Hovet, Stockholm; Attendance: 2,516
7 December 2006; 20:15		Report		Hovet, Stockholm; Attendance: 2,516

9 December 2006; 15:00	Croatia	24–23	Ukraine	Hovet, Stockholm; Attendance: 2,000
9 December 2006; 15:00		(11–11)		Hovet, Stockholm; Attendance: 2,000
9 December 2006; 15:00		Report		Hovet, Stockholm; Attendance: 2,000

9 December 2006; 17:15	Sweden	15–30	Russia	Hovet, Stockholm; Attendance: 3,500; Referees: Cohen, Peretz (ISR)
9 December 2006; 17:15	Boson 4	(7–15)	four players 5	Hovet, Stockholm; Attendance: 3,500; Referees: Cohen, Peretz (ISR)
9 December 2006; 17:15	4× (yellow card) 5× (suspension)	Report	3× (yellow card) 8× (suspension) 1× (red card)	Hovet, Stockholm; Attendance: 3,500; Referees: Cohen, Peretz (ISR)

10 December 2006; 14:00	Russia	40–32	Ukraine	Hovet, Stockholm; Attendance: 1,000; Referees: Liachovičius, Paškevičius (LTU)
10 December 2006; 14:00	Polenova 9	(18–19)	Boklaschuk, Reznir 6	Hovet, Stockholm; Attendance: 1,000; Referees: Liachovičius, Paškevičius (LTU)
10 December 2006; 14:00	3× (yellow card) 2× (suspension)	Report	3× (yellow card) 3× (suspension)	Hovet, Stockholm; Attendance: 1,000; Referees: Liachovičius, Paškevičius (LTU)

10 December 2006; 16:15	Croatia	21–20	Sweden	Hovet, Stockholm; Attendance: 3,317
10 December 2006; 16:15		(10–12)		Hovet, Stockholm; Attendance: 3,317
10 December 2006; 16:15		Report		Hovet, Stockholm; Attendance: 3,317

=== Group D ===
Pos	Team	Pld	W	D	L	GF	GA	GD	Pts	Qualification
1	Spain	3	2	0	1	78	67	+11	4 (Note: Spain 2 Pts, +1 GD; France 2 Pts, 0 GD; Denmark 2 Pts, –1 GD)	Main round
2	France	3	2	0	1	76	74	+2	4	Main round
3	Denmark	3	2	0	1	77	71	+6	4	Main round
4	Netherlands	3	0	0	3	65	84	−19	0	

Source: EHF
Rules for classification: 1) points; 2) head-to-head points; 3) head-to-head goal difference; 4) head-to-head number of goals scored; 5) goal difference.
Notes:

7 December 2006; 18:00	Spain	26–16	Netherlands	Baltiska Hallen, Malmö; Attendance: 1,650
7 December 2006; 18:00		(11–9)		Baltiska Hallen, Malmö; Attendance: 1,650
7 December 2006; 18:00		Report		Baltiska Hallen, Malmö; Attendance: 1,650

7 December 2006; 20:15	Denmark	20–24	France	Baltiska Hallen, Malmö; Attendance: 3,128
7 December 2006; 20:15		(10–8)		Baltiska Hallen, Malmö; Attendance: 3,128
7 December 2006; 20:15		Report		Baltiska Hallen, Malmö; Attendance: 3,128

9 December 2006; 18:00	France	24–28	Spain	Baltiska Hallen, Malmö; Attendance: 2,700
9 December 2006; 18:00		(12–15)		Baltiska Hallen, Malmö; Attendance: 2,700
9 December 2006; 18:00		Report		Baltiska Hallen, Malmö; Attendance: 2,700

9 December 2006; 20:15	Netherlands	23–30	Denmark	Baltiska Hallen, Malmö; Attendance: 3,278
9 December 2006; 20:15		(12–17)		Baltiska Hallen, Malmö; Attendance: 3,278
9 December 2006; 20:15		Report		Baltiska Hallen, Malmö; Attendance: 3,278

10 December 2006; 16:15	Denmark	27–24	Spain	Baltiska Hallen, Malmö; Attendance: 3,214
10 December 2006; 16:15		(17–12)		Baltiska Hallen, Malmö; Attendance: 3,214
10 December 2006; 16:15		Report		Baltiska Hallen, Malmö; Attendance: 3,214

10 December 2006; 18:30	France	28–26	Netherlands	Baltiska Hallen, Malmö; Attendance: 2,200
10 December 2006; 18:30		(11–13)		Baltiska Hallen, Malmö; Attendance: 2,200
10 December 2006; 18:30		Report		Baltiska Hallen, Malmö; Attendance: 2,200

== Main round ==
=== Group I ===
Pos	Team	Pld	W	D	L	GF	GA	GD	Pts	Qualification
1	Norway	5	5	0	0	160	111	+49	10	Semifinals
2	Germany	5	4	0	1	143	116	+27	8	Semifinals
3	Hungary	5	3	0	2	167	134	+33	6	Fifth place game
4	Poland	5	2	0	3	130	156	−26	4	
5	Austria	5	1	0	4	121	173	−52	2	
6	Macedonia	5	0	0	5	113	144	−31	0	

Source: EHF
Rules for classification: 1) points; 2) head-to-head points; 3) head-to-head goal difference; 4) head-to-head number of goals scored; 5) goal difference.

12 December 2006; 15:00	Macedonia	33–35	Poland	Scandinavium, Gothenburg; Attendance: 2,077
12 December 2006; 15:00		(21–16)		Scandinavium, Gothenburg; Attendance: 2,077
12 December 2006; 15:00		Report		Scandinavium, Gothenburg; Attendance: 2,077

12 December 2006; 17:00	Hungary	27–34	Germany	Scandinavium, Gothenburg; Attendance: 2,189
12 December 2006; 17:00		(9–19)		Scandinavium, Gothenburg; Attendance: 2,189
12 December 2006; 17:00		Report		Scandinavium, Gothenburg; Attendance: 2,189

12 December 2006; 19:15	Austria	24–39	Norway	Scandinavium, Gothenburg; Attendance: 2,278
12 December 2006; 19:15		(14–18)		Scandinavium, Gothenburg; Attendance: 2,278
12 December 2006; 19:15		Report		Scandinavium, Gothenburg; Attendance: 2,278

13 December 2006; 15:00	Hungary	37–21	Poland	Scandinavium, Gothenburg; Attendance: 2,051
13 December 2006; 15:00		(16–9)		Scandinavium, Gothenburg; Attendance: 2,051
13 December 2006; 15:00		Report		Scandinavium, Gothenburg; Attendance: 2,051

13 December 2006; 17:00	Austria	22–34	Germany	Scandinavium, Gothenburg; Attendance: 2,225
13 December 2006; 17:00		(11–19)		Scandinavium, Gothenburg; Attendance: 2,225
13 December 2006; 17:00		Report		Scandinavium, Gothenburg; Attendance: 2,225

13 December 2006; 19:15	Macedonia	13–28	Norway	Scandinavium, Gothenburg; Attendance: 2,307
13 December 2006; 19:15		(10–17)		Scandinavium, Gothenburg; Attendance: 2,307
13 December 2006; 19:15		Report		Scandinavium, Gothenburg; Attendance: 2,307

14 December 2006; 15:00	Austria	24–33	Poland	Scandinavium, Gothenburg; Attendance: 2,049
14 December 2006; 15:00		(12–20)		Scandinavium, Gothenburg; Attendance: 2,049
14 December 2006; 15:00		Report		Scandinavium, Gothenburg; Attendance: 2,049

14 December 2006; 17:00	Macedonia	20–23	Germany	Scandinavium, Gothenburg; Attendance: 2,235
14 December 2006; 17:00		(10–10)		Scandinavium, Gothenburg; Attendance: 2,235
14 December 2006; 17:00		Report		Scandinavium, Gothenburg; Attendance: 2,235

14 December 2006; 19:15	Hungary	31–34	Norway	Scandinavium, Gothenburg; Attendance: 2,434
14 December 2006; 19:15		(16–17)		Scandinavium, Gothenburg; Attendance: 2,434
14 December 2006; 19:15		Report		Scandinavium, Gothenburg; Attendance: 2,434

=== Group II ===
Pos	Team	Pld	W	D	L	GF	GA	GD	Pts	Qualification
1	Russia	5	5	0	0	145	112	+33	10	Semifinals
2	France	5	3	0	2	122	117	+5	6	Semifinals
3	Sweden (H)	5	2	0	3	109	120	−11	4 (Note: Sweden 2 Pts, +4 GD; Croatia 2 Pts, –1 GD; Spain 2 Pts, –3 GD)	Fifth place game
4	Croatia	5	2	0	3	117	120	−3	4	
5	Spain	5	2	0	3	124	133	−9	4	
6	Denmark	5	1	0	4	118	133	−15	2	

Source: EHF
Rules for classification: 1) points; 2) head-to-head points; 3) head-to-head goal difference; 4) head-to-head number of goals scored; 5) goal difference.
(H) Hosts
Notes:

12 December 2006; 16:00	Croatia	27–29	Spain	Hovet, Stockholm; Attendance: 200
12 December 2006; 16:00		(21–16)		Hovet, Stockholm; Attendance: 200
12 December 2006; 16:00		Report		Hovet, Stockholm; Attendance: 200

12 December 2006; 16:00	Russia	25–24	France	Hovet, Stockholm; Attendance: 500; Referees: Cirligeanu, Bejinariu (ROU)
12 December 2006; 16:00	Poltoratskaya 8	(10–11)	Dembélé 5	Hovet, Stockholm; Attendance: 500; Referees: Cirligeanu, Bejinariu (ROU)
12 December 2006; 16:00	2× (yellow card) 1× (suspension)	Report	3× (yellow card) 3× (suspension)	Hovet, Stockholm; Attendance: 500; Referees: Cirligeanu, Bejinariu (ROU)

12 December 2006; 20:15	Sweden	27–22	Denmark	Hovet, Stockholm; Attendance: 1,252
12 December 2006; 20:15		(15–12)		Hovet, Stockholm; Attendance: 1,252
12 December 2006; 20:15		Report		Hovet, Stockholm; Attendance: 1,252

13 December 2006; 16:00	Croatia	21–22	France	Hovet, Stockholm; Attendance: 300
13 December 2006; 16:00		(10–8)		Hovet, Stockholm; Attendance: 300
13 December 2006; 16:00		Report		Hovet, Stockholm; Attendance: 300

13 December 2006; 18:00	Sweden	24–19	Spain	Hovet, Stockholm; Attendance: 1,500
13 December 2006; 18:00		(10–10)		Hovet, Stockholm; Attendance: 1,500
13 December 2006; 18:00		Report		Hovet, Stockholm; Attendance: 1,500

13 December 2006; 20:15	Russia	32–27	Denmark	Hovet, Stockholm; Referees: Baum, Góralczyk (POL)
13 December 2006; 20:15	Polenova 7	(17–13)	Mikkelsen 7	Hovet, Stockholm; Referees: Baum, Góralczyk (POL)
13 December 2006; 20:15	2× (yellow card) 4× (suspension)	Report	4× (yellow card) 7× (suspension)	Hovet, Stockholm; Referees: Baum, Góralczyk (POL)

14 December 2006; 16:00	Sweden	23–28	France	Hovet, Stockholm; Attendance: 2,135
14 December 2006; 16:00		(13–13)		Hovet, Stockholm; Attendance: 2,135
14 December 2006; 16:00		Report		Hovet, Stockholm; Attendance: 2,135

14 December 2006; 18:00	Croatia	26–22	Denmark	Hovet, Stockholm; Attendance: 850
14 December 2006; 18:00		(16–9)		Hovet, Stockholm; Attendance: 850
14 December 2006; 18:00		Report		Hovet, Stockholm; Attendance: 850

14 December 2006; 20:15	Russia	31–24	Spain	Hovet, Stockholm; Attendance: 450
14 December 2006; 20:15	Levina 7	(14–11)	Aguilar 6	Hovet, Stockholm; Attendance: 450
14 December 2006; 20:15	3× (yellow card) 3× (suspension) 1× (red card)	Report	3× (yellow card) 5× (suspension)	Hovet, Stockholm; Attendance: 450

== Knockout stage ==
=== Bracket ===
Semifinals
16 December
Norway	28
France	24
16 December
Germany	29
Russia	33

Final
17 December
Norway	27
Russia	24
Third place
17 December
France	29
Germany	25

=== Fifth place game ===
16 December 2006; 12:00	Hungary	32–25	Sweden	Hovet, Stockholm; Attendance: 2,500; Referees: Liachovičius, Paškevičius (LTU)
16 December 2006; 12:00	Mehlmann 8	(17–12)	Chrifi 9	Hovet, Stockholm; Attendance: 2,500; Referees: Liachovičius, Paškevičius (LTU)
16 December 2006; 12:00	3× (yellow card) 3× (suspension)	Report	4× (yellow card) 1× (suspension)	Hovet, Stockholm; Attendance: 2,500; Referees: Liachovičius, Paškevičius (LTU)

=== Semifinals ===
16 December 2006; 14:30	Germany	29–33	Russia	Hovet, Stockholm; Attendance: 3,054; Referees: Goulão, Macau (POR)
16 December 2006; 14:30	Jurack 8	(13–16)	Turey 5	Hovet, Stockholm; Attendance: 3,054; Referees: Goulão, Macau (POR)
16 December 2006; 14:30	2× (yellow card) 3× (suspension)	Report	2× (yellow card) 4× (suspension) 1× (red card)	Hovet, Stockholm; Attendance: 3,054; Referees: Goulão, Macau (POR)

16 December 2006; 17:00	Norway	28–24	France	Hovet, Stockholm; Attendance: 3,617; Referees: Laursen, Nielsen (DEN)
16 December 2006; 17:00	Hammerseng 8	(15–12)	Spincer, Vanparys-Torres 5	Hovet, Stockholm; Attendance: 3,617; Referees: Laursen, Nielsen (DEN)
16 December 2006; 17:00	3× (yellow card) 2× (suspension)	Report	4× (yellow card) 4× (suspension)	Hovet, Stockholm; Attendance: 3,617; Referees: Laursen, Nielsen (DEN)

=== Third place game ===
17 December 2006; 13:30	France	29–25	Germany	Hovet, Stockholm; Attendance: 3,415; Referees: Hagen, Hallberg (SWE)
17 December 2006; 13:30	Spincer 7	(14–11)	Jurack 7	Hovet, Stockholm; Attendance: 3,415; Referees: Hagen, Hallberg (SWE)
17 December 2006; 13:30	2× (yellow card) 4× (suspension)	Report	2× (yellow card) 2× (suspension)	Hovet, Stockholm; Attendance: 3,415; Referees: Hagen, Hallberg (SWE)

=== Final ===
17 December 2006; 16:00	Norway	27–24	Russia	Hovet, Stockholm; Attendance: 4,727; Referees: Baum, Góralczyk (POL)
17 December 2006; 16:00	Johansen 9	(16–12)	Polenova, Poltoratskaya 6	Hovet, Stockholm; Attendance: 4,727; Referees: Baum, Góralczyk (POL)
17 December 2006; 16:00	3× (yellow card) 4× (suspension)	Report	3× (yellow card) 2× (suspension)	Hovet, Stockholm; Attendance: 4,727; Referees: Baum, Góralczyk (POL)

== Ranking and statistics ==
=== Final ranking ===
Gold medal	Norway
Silver medal	Russia
Bronze medal	France
4	Germany
5	Hungary
6	Sweden
7	Croatia
8	Poland
9	Spain
10	Austria
11	Denmark
12	Macedonia
13	Ukraine
14	Serbia
15	Netherlands
16	Slovenia

2006 Women's European Champions

Norway
Third Title

Team roster

Marit Malm Frafjord, Terese Pedersen, Gro Hammerseng, Kristine Lunde,
Marianne Rokne, Katrine Lunde, Else-Marthe Sørlie, Gøril Snorroeggen,
Anette Hovind Johansen, Karoline Dyhre Breivang, Kari Aalvik Grimsbø,
Ragnhild Aamodt, Anne Kjersti Suvdal, Kari Mette Johansen,
Linn-Kristin Riegelhuth, Katja Nyberg and Tonje Nøstvold
Head coach: Marit Breivik

=== All-Star team ===
- Goalkeeper: Inna Suslina (RUS)
- Left wing: Kari Mette Johansen (NOR)
- Left back: Nadine Krause (GER)
- Pivot: Lyudmila Bodniyeva (RUS)
- Centre back: Gro Hammerseng (NOR)
- Right back: Ibolya Mehlmann (HUN)
- Right wing: Annika Wiel Fredén (SWE)
- Best defense player: Isabelle Wendling (FRA)
- Most valuable player: Gro Hammerseng (NOR)

Source: EHF Archived 2020-12-02 at the Wayback Machine

=== Top goalscorers ===
Rank	Name	Team	Goals	Shots	%
1	Nadine Krause	Germany	58	94	62
2	Karolina Kudłacz	Poland	48	79	61
3	Tanja Logwin	Austria	45	89	51
4	Gro Hammerseng	Norway	41	58	71
4	Kari Mette Johansen	Norway	41	53	77
4	Grit Jurack	Germany	41	89	46
7	Marina Naukovič	Macedonia	40	96	42
8	Ibolya Mehlmann	Hungary	37	71	52
9	Angélique Spincer	France	35	71	49
10	Susana Fraile	Spain	34	68	50
10	Yelena Polenova	Russia	34	64	53

Source: EHF

=== Top goalkeepers ===
Rank	Name	Team	%	Saves	Shots
1	Inna Suslina	Russia	44	71	163
2	Katrine Lunde	Norway	42	89	214
3	Sabine Englert	Germany	41	65	160
3	Katalin Pálinger	Hungary	41	99	239
5	Jokelyn Tienstra	Netherlands	38	36	94
6	Jelena Grubišić	Croatia	37	32	87
6	Iwona Łącz	Poland	37	49	134
8	Valérie Nicolas	France	36	92	255
9	Louise Bager Due	Denmark	35	33	94
9	Madeleine Grundström	Sweden	35	79	223
9	Karin Mortensen	Denmark	35	28	80
9	Rikke Schmidt	Denmark	35	23	65

Source: EHF
