= Pîslaru =

Pîslaru is a surname. Notable people with the surname include:

- Dragoș Pîslaru (born 1976), Romanian economist and politician
- Tereza Pîslaru (born 1982), Romanian handball player
