= Isabel Plach =

Austrian handball player (born 1987)

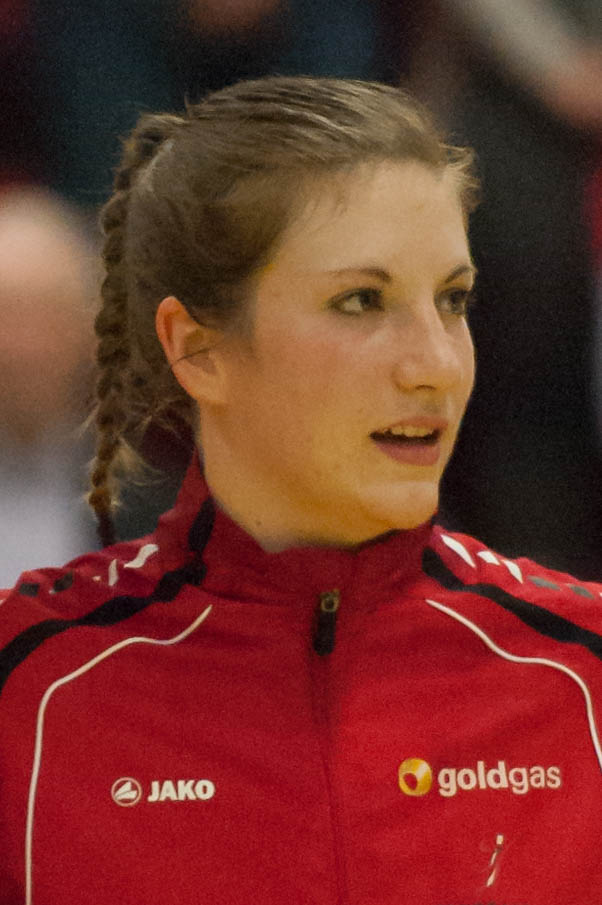
- Plach in 2014

Personal information
- Full name: Isabel Plach
- Nationality: Austrian
- Born: 19 April 1987 (age 39) Vienna, Austria

Sport
- Sport: Handball
- Position: Left Wing
- Number: 17

Senior clubs
- Years: Team
- 2005–: Hypo Niederösterreich
- 2014–2017: UHC Eggenburg
National team
Years	Team	Apps
–	Austria	107

Isabel Plach (born 19 April 1987 in Vienna) is an Austrian former handballer who played for Hypo Niederösterreich and UHC Eggenburg. She also featured in the Austrian national team.

== Achievements ==
- Women Handball Austria:
  - Winner: 2006, 2007, 2008, 2009, 2010, 2011
- ÖHB Cup:
  - Winner: 2006, 2007, 2008, 2009, 2010, 2011
- EHF Champions League:
  - Finalist: 2008
