= Kim Jin-sun (handballer) =

South Korean handball player (born 1979)

Personal information
- Nationality: South Korean
- Born: 27 April 1979 (age 47)

Sport
- Sport: Handball

Kim Jin-sun (Korean: 김진순, born 27 April 1979) is a South Korean handball player and coach. She competed in the women's tournament at the 2000 Summer Olympics.

She played for the Korea National Sport University and Hiroshima Maple Reds.

After playing she has coached the Korean youth team, and led them at the 2022 IHF Women's U18 Handball World Championship.
