= Nadine Krause =

German handball player (born 1982)

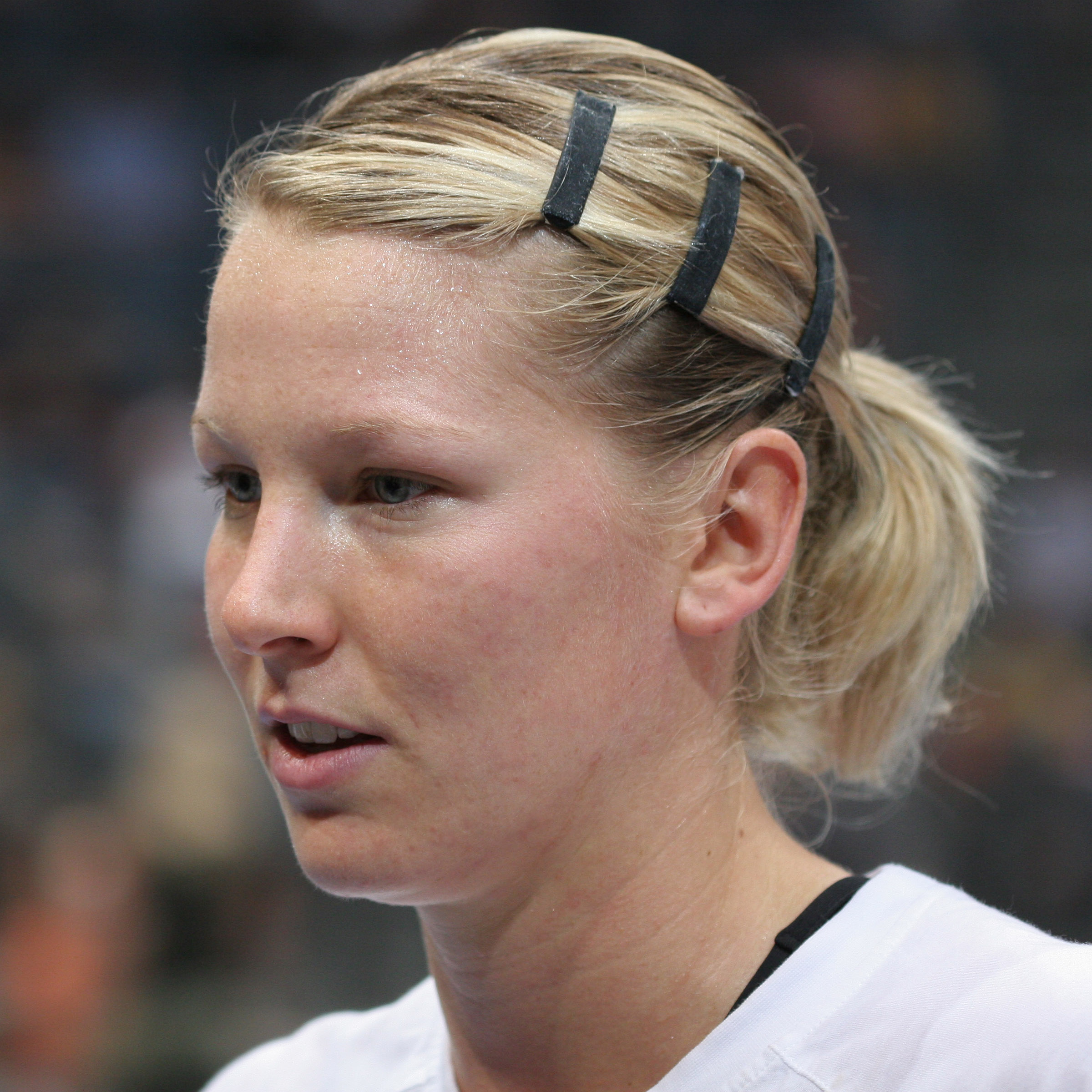

Personal information
- Full name: Nadine Krause
- Nationality: German
- Born: 25 March 1982 (age 44) Waiblingen, West Germany
- Height: 1.78 m (5 ft 10 in)

Sport
- Sport: Handball
- Position: Left Back
- Current club: retired

Senior clubs
- Years: Team
- –1999: VfL Waiblingen
- 1999–2001: HSG Blomberg-Lippe
- 2001–2007: TSV Bayer Leverkusen
- 2007–2010: FCK Håndbold
- 2010–2011: HSG Blomberg-Lippe
- 2011–2012: TSV Bayer Leverkusen
National team
Years	Team	Apps	(Gls)
1999–2011	Germany	188	(741)
Medal record
Junior World Championship
Bronze medal – third place	2001 Hungary	Team
World Championship
Bronze medal – third place	2007 France	Team
- Updated on 2 December 2011

Nadine Krause (born 25 March 1982, in Waiblingen) is a former German handballer who last played for Bayer Leverkusen as a left back. She made her debut on the German A-Team in 1999, at the age of 17. She was voted IHF World Player of the Year 2006.

She is naturally left handed, but was known for being able to play with both hands.

== Career ==
Krause started playing handball in her hometown Waiblingen. Later she joined VfL Waiblingen, where her father, Jürgen Krause was coaching.

She then joined HSG Blomberg-Lippe.

From 2001 to 2007 she played for TSV Bayer Leverkusen. Here she won the 2002 DHB-Pokal and the 2005 European Challenge Cup. She was the topscorer in the Bundesliga in the 2004/2005 and 2005/2006 season.

In 2007 she joined Danish side FCK Håndbold, where she played for three years before returning to HSG Blomberg-Lippe. With FCK she won the Danish cup in 2009. She was the topscorer of the Danish league in the 2007/2008 season.

In 2012 she joined Bayer Leverkusen once again to play for a single season before retiring.

=== National team ===
Krause debuted for the national team on November 23rd 1999 against Romania at the age of 17.

She was top scorer at the 2005 World Championships, and finished 6th with the German team.

At the 2006 European Championship she was once again top scorer with 58 goals.

At the 2007 World Women's Handball Championship she won a bronze medal with Germany. She also represented Germany at the 2008 Olympics.

She missed the 2009 World Championship in China due to injury. She returned to play at the 2011 World Women's Handball Championship.

== Achievements ==
- German Cup:
  - Winner: 2002
- Landspokalturneringen:
  - Winner: 2009
- EHF Challenge Cup:
  - Winner: 2005
- EHF Cup Winners' Cup:
  - Winner: 2009
- World Championship:
  - Bronze Medalist: 2007

== Awards and recognition ==
- IHF World Player of the Year: 2006
- German Handballer of the Year: 2005, 2006
- All-Star Left Back of the European Championship:2004
- Bundesliga Player of the Season: 2004–05, 2005–06, 2006–07
- World Championship Top Scorer: 2005
- European Championship Top Scorer: 2006
- Bundesliga Top Scorer: 2005, 2006
- Damehåndboldligaen Top Scorer: 2008

Awards
Preceded by Anita Görbicz	IHF World Player of the Year – Women; 2006	Succeeded by Gro Hammerseng
