= Zhang Zhiqing =

Chinese handball player (born 1981)

Zhang Zhiqing (simplified Chinese: 张枝青; traditional Chinese: 張枝青; pinyin: Zhāng Zhīqīng; born October 14, 1981, in Qingdao, Shandong) is a female Chinese handball player who competed at the 2004 Summer Olympics.

In 2004, she finished eighth with the Chinese team in the women's competition. She did not play in a match, but was a reserve player.
