= Marianne Rokne =

Norwegian handball player (born 1978)

Personal information
- Nationality: Norwegian
- Born: 9 March 1978 (age 48) Bergen, Norway
- Height: 178 cm (70 in)

Sport
- Sport: Handball
- Position: Centre back
- Current club: Retired

Senior clubs
- Years: Team
- 1988-2003: Tertnes IL
- 2003-2005: SK Århus
- 2005-2006: Aalborg DH
- 2006-2009: GOG Svendborg TGI
- 2009-2012: Tertnes IL
National team
Years	Team	Apps	(Gls)
1998–2007	Norway	101	(294)
Medal record
Olympic Games
Bronze medal – third place	2000 Sydney	Team Competition
World Championship
Gold medal – first place	1999 Denmark/Norway	Team competition
Silver medal – second place	2001 Italy	Team competition
European Championship
Gold medal – first place	2006 Sweden	Team competition

Marianne Rokne (born 9 March 1978) is a Norwegian team handball player and World champion from 1999. She received a bronze medal at the 2000 Summer Olympics in Sydney.

== Career ==
She started playing handball at the age of 10 in Tertnes IL, where she debuted for the senior team at the age of 16 in 1994. In 2003 she moved to Denmark to join Danish side SK Århus. Here she played for 2 years before joining league rivals Aalborg DH. She left Aalborg after having her contract cancelled, due to a disagreement over a wage increase for the participation in the 2005 World Championship. Then case was eventually settled in court. She then signed for GOG Svendborg TGI. She played 3 seasons for GOG, where she was injured a lot. In 2010 she returned to Tertnes IL. In October 2010 she took a break from handball due to maternity leave. She left Tertnes after the 2011-12 season.

=== National team ===
She debuted for the Norwegian national team on July 2nd 1998 in a match against Denmark.

She won a gold medal at the 1999 World Championship at home. and a silver medal at the 2001 World Championship in Italy, and a gold medal at the 2006 European Women's Handball Championship in Sweden.
