= Sun Laimiao =

Chinese handball player (born 1981)

Sun Laimiao (simplified Chinese: 孙来苗; traditional Chinese: 孫來苗; pinyin: Sūn Láimiáo; born April 8, 1981, in Chuzhou, Anhui) is a Chinese handball player who competed at the 2004 Summer Olympics.

In 2004, she finished eighth with the Chinese team in the women's competition. She played five matches and scored two goals.
