= Jokelyn Tienstra =

Dutch handball player (1970–2015)

Jokelyn Tienstra (10 October 1970 in Borculo – 8 December 2015 in Xanten) was a Dutch handball player.

== Career ==
Tienstra played 175 times on behalf of the Netherlands with handball competitions, including three world championships and two European championships. From 1985 to 1994, Tienstra played at the highest level and "won everything there was to win."

After her active career as handball star, she became a goalkeeping coach for many years involved in the women's team of the Netherlands. Eventually, she became the leader of the Handball Academy at the Dutch Handball Association (NHV).

Tienstra represented clubs who took part in the Dutch, Norwegian, Danish, Spanish and German leagues. She was part of the Dutch team that finished fifth in the Women's Handball World Championship in 2005 and is considered one of the best Dutch handballers ever.

== Personal life and death ==
In 2008, Tienstra survived a car accident in which she collapsed behind the wheel because of a seizure. Doctors found a serious brain tumor as the cause of the collapse and she was operated on in 2009. However, the tumor came back later and she died on 8 December 2015.

== Film ==
In 2012, the Netherlands Brain Foundation filmmaker Bob Kukler wanted to make a film about Tienstra. The theme of this movie was "boundary breaking". The film would be called Oer de grins te vinden. (Friesland DOK, Omrop Fryslân)
