= Tatiana Alizar =

Russian handball player

Personal information
- Full name: Tatiana Adamovna Alizar
- Nationality: Russian
- Born: 21 November 1978 (age 47) Volgograd, Russian SFSR, Soviet Union
- Height: 1.85 m (6 ft 1 in)

Sport
- Sport: Handball
- Position: Goalkeeper
- Current club: Retired

Senior clubs
- Years: Team
- 1997-2005: Dinamo Volgograd
- 2005-2007: RK Krim
- 2007-2008: Maliye Milli Piyango SK
- 2008-2010: Dinamo Volgograd
- 2010-2011: SD Itxako
- 2011: Zvezda Zvenigorod
National team
- Years: Team
- 2000-2005: Russia

Teams managed
- –: Dinamo Volgograd (GK Coach)
Medal record
World Championship
Gold medal – first place	2001 Italy	Team
Gold medal – first place	2005 Russia	Team

Tatiana Adamovna Alizar (Russian: Татьяна Адамовна Ализар, born 21 November 1978) is a former Russian handball player, who was part of the Russian team that won the 2001 and 2005 World Championships.

== Career ==
Alizar started playing handball at a handball academy in Volgograd. In 1997 she joined Dinamo Volgograd, where she played until 2005. Here she won the Russian championship in 1999, 2000 and 2001. In 2005 she joined Slovenian top club RK Krim, where she played until 2007. Here she won the Slovenian Cup in 2006 and 2007 and reached the final of the Champions League in 2007. In 2008 she joined Turkish Maliye Milli Piyango SK, where she won the Turkish championship in the single season she played there.

She then returned to Dinamo Volgograd, where she won two additional Russian championships in 2009 and 2010. In 2010 she joined Spanish team SD Itxako, but had her contract cancelled already in January in her first season. She then joined Zvezda Zvenigorod for the rest of the season. At the end of the season she retired as a player.

After retirement she has worked as the Goalkeeping coach at the 2nd team of Dinamo Volgograd.
