= N'Cho Elodie Mambo =

Ivorian handball player

N'Cho Elodie Mambo (born 30 March 1981) is an Ivorian handball player who has played for Mérignac and the Côte d'Ivoire women's national handball team. She was listed among the top ten goalscoreres at the 2009 World Women's Handball Championship in China, with 52 goals.
