= Luminița Dinu =

Romanian handball player (born 1971)

Personal information
- Nationality: Romanian
- Born: 6 November 1971 (age 54) Piatra Neamț, Romania
- Height: 1.82 m (6 ft 0 in)

Sport
- Sport: Handball
- Position: Goalkeeper
- Current club: Retired

Senior clubs
- Years: Team
- 1987–1998: Relonul Săvinești
- 1998–2000: Oltchim
- 2000–2002: Krim
- 2002: Kometal
- 2002–2006: Krim
- 2006–2009: Oltchim
- 2012: Oltchim
National team
Years	Team	Apps	(Gls)
1998–2009	Romania	199	(10)
Medal record
World Championship
Silver medal – second place	2005 Russia	Team

Luminița Dinu (née Huțupan; born 6 November 1971) is a Romanian handball player. She is considered a handball legend in Romania. She received a silver medal at the 2005 World Championship and was named goalkeeper of the All-Star Team.

She was inducted into the EHF Hall of Fame in 2024.

In January 2011, Dinu was chosen the best female goalkeeper ever in a fans' poll carried out by the International Handball Federation by collecting more than 7000 votes (nearly 94%).

For her services to the team and the city, and her exemplary sportsmanship conduct, Dinu was made Honorary Citizen of Râmnicu Vâlcea in 2010. She was also given the award of Cetățean de onoare ("Honorary Citizen") of Neamț County in 2009.

== Biography ==
Dinu-Huțupan, who began playing handball in 1985, has a high school diploma, is married, and speaks Romanian and Slovene. She has also played for HC Kometal Gjorče Petrov and Krim Ljubljana.

== Achievements ==
=== Club ===
- 3 times winner of Ch. League Cup (2001, 2002, 2003)
- 2 times winner of European Super Cup (2004, 2007)
- 5 times winner of Romanian First League of Women's Handball
- 6 times winner of Slovenian Championship
- 4 times winner of Romanian Cup
- 6 times winner of Slovenian Cup
- Winner of Romanian SuperCup - 1st Edition
- Winner of Cup Winners'Cup (2007)
- Winner of Champions Trophy - 1st Edition

=== National team ===
- 2nd place 2005 World Women's Handball Championship

=== Individual ===
- Romanian Handballer of the Year: 2006, 2007, 2008
- Best Goalkeeper of 2000 European Women's Handball Championship
- Best Goalkeeper of 2005 World Women's Handball Championship
- Best Goalkeeper of 2007 EHF Women's Champions Trophy
- Most Valuable Player of 2005 World Women's Handball Championship
- Best Goalkeeper Ever – fans' poll
