= Idalina Mesquita =

Brazilian handball player (born 1976)

Idalina Mesquita (born 2 July 1976) is a Brazilian handball player (left wing). She was born in Rio de Janeiro. She competed at the 2000 Summer Olympics in Sydney, where the Brazilian team placed 8th, and also at the 2004 Summer Olympics in Athens and at the 2008 Summer Olympics in Beijing.
