= Simona Gogîrlă =

Romanian handball player (born 1975)

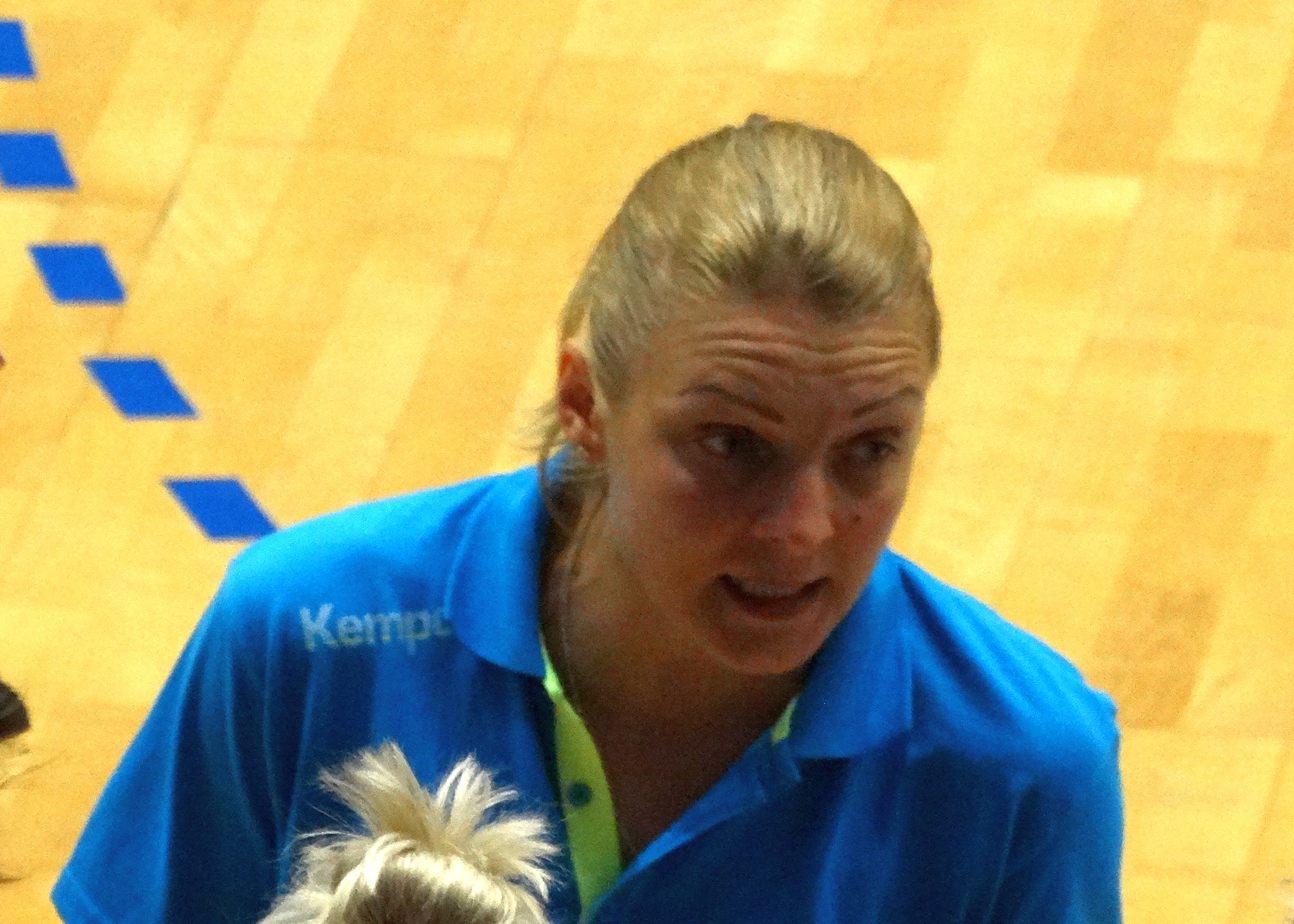

Personal information
- Full name: Simona Silvia Gogîrlă
- Nationality: România
- Born: 11 April 1975 (age 51) Focşani, Romania
- Height: 1.80 m (5 ft 11 in)

Sport
- Sport: Handball
- Position: Left back
- Current club: Retired 15 February 2011
- Number: 17

Senior clubs
- Years: Team
- 1993–1997: Oltchim Vâlcea
- 1997–2001: Krim
- 2001–2003: Oltchim Vâlcea
- 2003–2004: SD Itxako
- 2004–2007: Győri ETO KC
- 2007–2010: Rulmentul Braşov
- 2010–2011: Rapid
National team
- Years: Team
- –: Romania
Medal record
Youth World Championship
Gold medal – first place	1995 Brasil	Team
World Championship
Silver medal – second place	2005 Russia	Team
- Updated on 23 June 2011

Simona Gogîrlă (born as Tutuianu; 11 April 1975) is a retired Romanian handball player. She received a silver medal in the 2005 World Championship. She is the current coach of SCM Craiova.

At the 2000 European Championship she was the top scorer with 59 goals.

== Club's Performances ==
(Romania) CS Oltchim Rm. Valcea (1993–1997)

- 1993-1994

Romania National League

Romanian CUP

- 1994-1995

Romania National League

Romanian CUP

- 1995-1996

Romania National League

Romanian CUP

- 1996-1997

Romania National League

Romanian CUP

(Slovenia) RK Krim Ljubljana (1997–2001)

- 1997-1998

Slovenia National League

Slovenia Cup

- 1997-1998 FINAL EHF Champions League
- 1998-1999

Slovenia National League

Slovenian Cup

- 1999-2000

Slovenia National League

Slovenian Cup

- 2000-2001

Slovenia National League

Slovenian Cup

(Romania) CS Oltchim Rm. Valcea (2001–2003)

- 2001-2002 FINAL Cup Winner's Cup

(Spain) SD Itxako Estella(2003/04)

- Play in EHF Cup and score 44 goals .

(Hungary) Györi Audi ETO (2004–2007)

- 2004-2005

Hungarian National League

Magyar Cup

- 2004-2005 FINAL EHF Cup

2005-2006

Hungarian National League

Magyar Cup

- Play EHF Champions League 2005-2006 and score 11 goals
- Play EHF Champions League 2006-2007 and score 23 goals

(Romania) Rulmentul-Urban Brasov (2007–2010)

- Play CUP WINNERS' CUP 2007/08 and score 47 goals
- Play EHF CUP 2008/09 and score 20 goals
- Play EHF CUP 2009/10 and score 13 goals

(Romania) Rapid Bucuresti (2010–2011)

- Play on National League I

Awards

- 2000 Top Scorer European Championship 2000 Romania
