= Wang Chanchan =

Chinese handball player (born 1983)

Personal information
- Nationality: Chinese
- Born: July 20, 1983 (age 43)
- Height: 175 cm (69 in)

Sport
- Sport: Handball
- Position: Right wing
National team
- Years: Team
- –: China

Wang Chanchan (born 20 July 1983) is a Chinese team handball player. She has played on the Chinese national team, and participated at the 2011 World Women's Handball Championship in Brazil.
