= Valentina Ardean-Elisei =

Romanian handball player (born 1982)

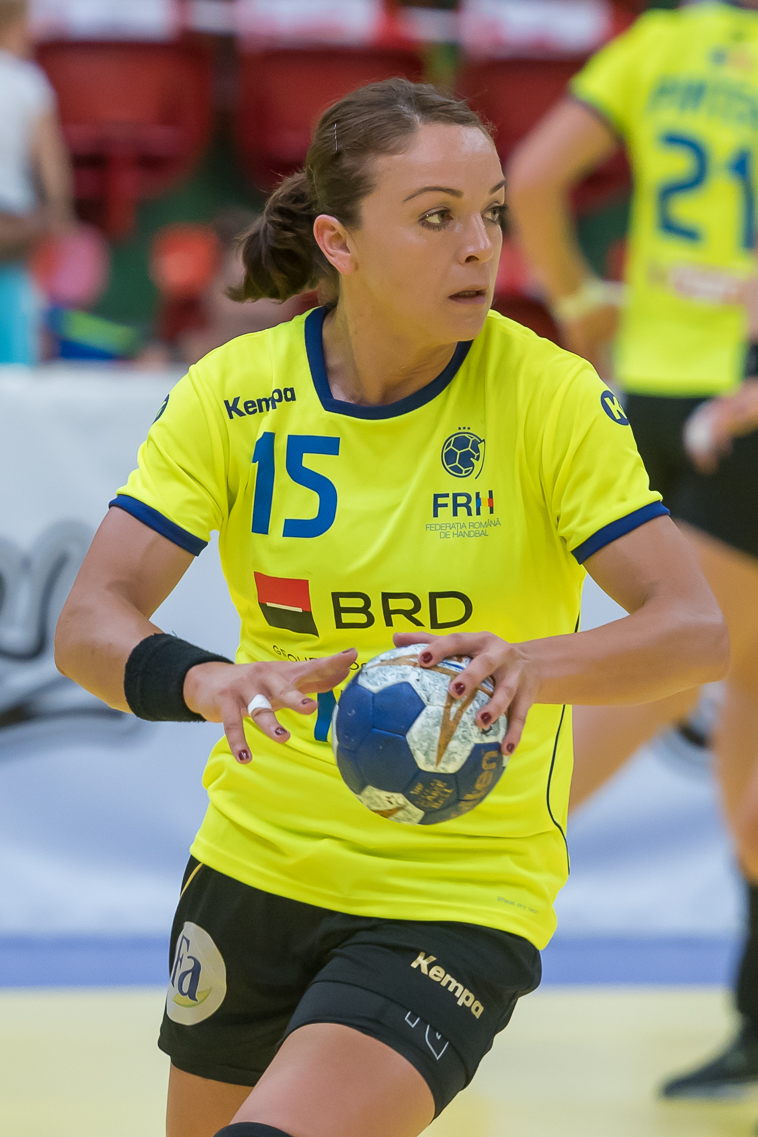
- Ardean-Elisei in 2017

Personal information
- Full name: Valentina-Neli Ardean-Elisei
- Nationality: Romanian
- Born: 5 June 1982 (age 44) Focşani, Romania
- Height: 1.71 m (5 ft 7 in)

Sport
- Sport: Handball
- Position: Left wing
- Current club: Gloria Bistrița
- Number: 15

Senior clubs
- Years: Team
- 2001–2004: Universitatea Remin Deva
- 2004–2006: ŽRK Knjaz Miloš
- 2006–2012: CS Oltchim Râmnicu Vâlcea
- 2013–2014: CSM Cetate Devatrans
- 2014–2016: HCM Baia Mare
- 2016–2018: SCM Craiova
- 2018–: Gloria Bistrița
National team
Years	Team	Apps	(Gls)
1999–2019	Romania	255	(912)
Medal record
World Championship
Silver medal – second place	2005 Russia
Bronze medal – third place	2015 Denmark
European Championship
Bronze medal – third place	2010 Denmark/Norway
Junior European Championship
Gold medal – first place	2000 France

Valentina-Neli Ardean-Elisei (born 5 June 1982) is a Romanian handballer for Gloria Bistrița. Since 26 September 2019, she is retired from the Romanian national team.

She received a silver medal in the 2005 World Championship and was named left wing of the All-Star Team. She was again given this award in the 2008 European Championship and in the 2015 World Championship.

She was given the award of Cetățean de onoare ("Honorary Citizen") of the city of Craiova in 2018.

== International honours ==
- EHF Champions League:
  - Silver Medalist: 2010
  - Bronze Medalist: 2009, 2012
- EHF Champions Trophy:
  - Winner: 2007
- EHF Cup Winners' Cup:
  - Winner: 2007
- EHF Cup:
  - Winner: 2018
- EHF Challenge Cup:
  - Winner: 2002
- World Championship:
  - Silver Medalist: 2005
  - Bronze Medalist: 2015
- Junior European Championship:
  - Winner: 2000

== Individual awards ==
- All-Star Left Wing of the World Championship: 2005
- All-Star Left Wing of the European Championship: 2008
- All-Star Left Wing of the World Championship: 2015
- EHF Cup Winners' Cup Top Scorer: 2007
