= Joyce Hilster =

Dutch handball player (born 1983)

Personal information
- Nationality: Dutch
- Born: 1 June 1983 (age 43) Naarden, Netherlands
- Height: 172 cm (68 in)

Sport
- Sport: Handball
- Position: Left wing
- Current club: Retired

Senior clubs
- Years: Team
- 2002-2003: GOG Håndbold
- 2003-2004: Westfriesland SEW
- 2004-2005: Bayer 04 Leverkusen
- 2005-2006: Westfriesland SEW
- 2006-2010: GOG Håndbold
- 2010-2011: Frisch Auf Göppingen
- 2011-2013: Bayer 04 Leverkusen
National team
Years	Team	Apps	(Gls)
2003-2012	Netherlands	121	(263)

Joyce Hilster (born 1 June 1983, Naarden) is a Dutch former team handball player. She played on the Dutch national team, and participated at the 2011 World Women's Handball Championship in Brazil. Hilster ended her career in 2013 at Bayer Leverkusen.

She retired in 2013 and has worked as a physiotherapist since.
