= Lyudmila Bodniyeva =

Russian handball player

Medal record

Representing Russia

Women's handball

World Championship
Gold medal – first place	2001 Italy	Team
Gold medal – first place	2005 Russia	Team

European Championship
Silver medal – second place	2006 Sweden	Team
Bronze medal – third place	2000 Romania	Team

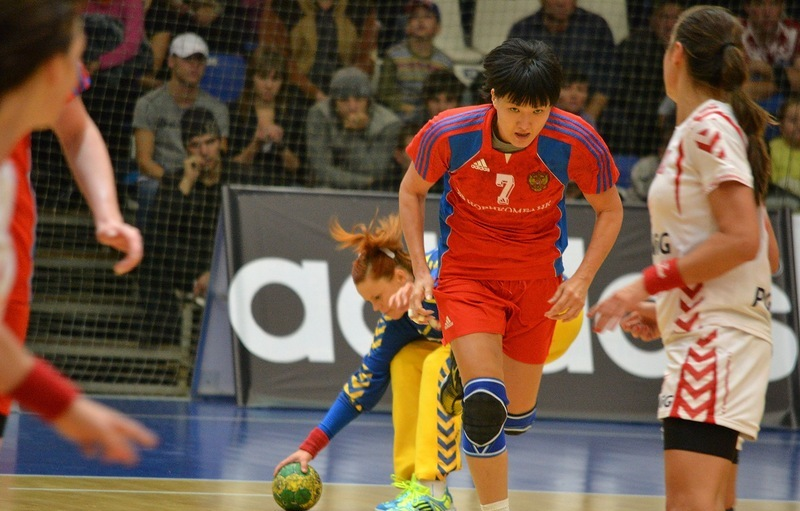

Lyudmila Valeryevna Bodniyeva (Russian: Людмила Валерьевна Бодниева; born on October 15, 1978, in Elista, Russia) is the current head coach of the Russian women's national handball team. She formerly played for the clubs Akva Volgograd and Krim Ljubljana, and was a world champion with the Russian women's national handball team. She is of Kalmyk ethnicity.

She won a gold medal with the winning Russian team at the 2005 World Women's Handball Championship in Saint Petersburg, Russia, and was selected into the championship's all-star team (as pivot).

She received a silver medal at the 2006 European Women's Handball Championship in Sweden, and was voted into the all-star team (pivot). She was also in the all-star team at the 2004 European Women's Handball Championship, where the Russian team finished 4th.

== Honours ==
Twice World Champion, silver and bronze medalist of Europe Championship "All star team" as pivot: World Championship 2001 Italy, 2005 Russia (MVP) European Championship 2000 Romania, 2002 Danmark, 2004 Hungaria, 2006 Sweden
