= Alimata Dosso =

Ivorian handball player

Alimata Dosso (born 1979) is an Ivorian handball player. She plays on the Ivorian national team, and participated at the 2011 World Women's Handball Championship in Brazil.
