= Anna Kurepta =

Russian handball player

Anna Filippova
Personal information
- Full name: Anna Yevgenyevna Filippova
- Nationality: Russian
- Born: 3 November 1982 (age 43)
- Height: 1.80 m (5 ft 11 in)

Sport
- Sport: Handball

Youth career
- Years: Team
- 1998–2001: HC Kuban Krasnodar

Senior clubs
- Years: Team
- 2001–2006: HC Kuban Krasnodar
- 2006–2008: Zvezda Zvenigorod
National team
- Years: Team
- 1997–2006: Russia
Medal record
World Championship
Gold medal – first place	Russia 2005	National Team

Anna Yevgenyevna Filippova (née Kurepta, Russian: Анна Евгеньевна Филиппова, born 3 November 1982) is a Russian former handball player. She was part of the Russian team that won the 2005 World Women's Handball Championship.

== Career ==
Filippova started playing handball at the age of 8. her career at HC Kuban Krasnodar, where she played until 2006. She then joined Zvezda Zvenigorod, where she won the Russian Women's Handball Super League in 2007, and the 2008 Champions League. She retired after the 2007-08 season.

== National team ==
Filippova played for the Russian youth national teamm between 1997 and 2001, with whom she won gold at the 2001 U20 Handball World Championship.

In 2004 she represented Russia at the 2004 European Women's Handball Championship, where Russia finished 4th, losing to Denmark in the semifinal and to Hungary in the third place play-off.

With the Russian senior team she won a gold medal at the 2005 World Championship at home. She played 6 games, scoring 9 goals.

== Private ==
She is married to the Russian handballer Vasily Filippov.

After her handball career she has worked at an orphanage.
