= Elena Slinvinskaya =

Russian handball player

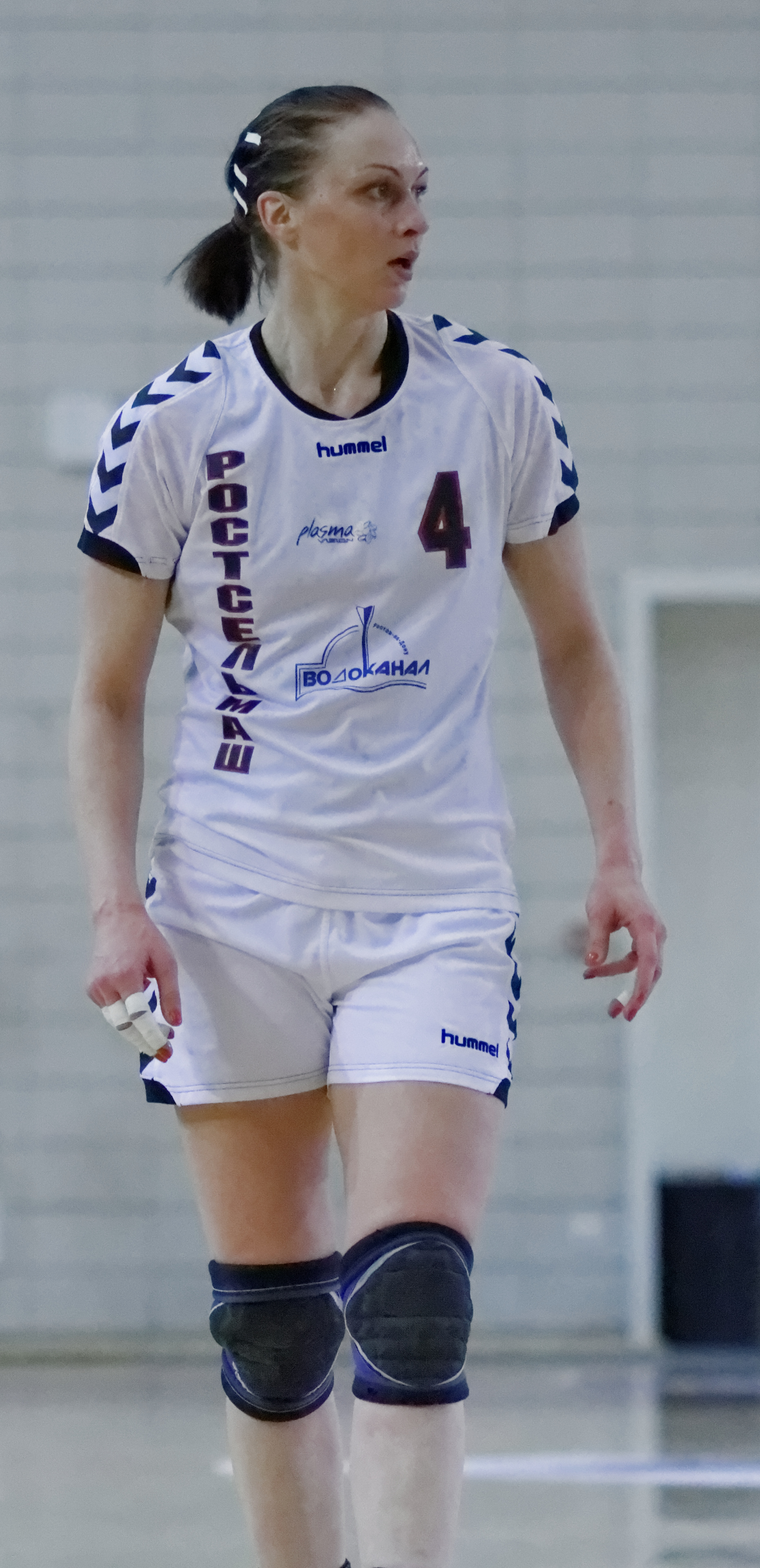
- Slinvinskaya in 2013 in EHF Cup Winners' Cup match against Issy Paris Hand

Personal information
- Full name: Elena Vasilievna Slinvinskaya
- Nationality: Russian
- Born: 9 May 1980 (age 46) Rostov-on-Don, Soviet Union
- Height: 1.86 m (6 ft 1 in)

Sport
- Sport: Handball
- Position: Right wing

Youth career
- Years: Team
- –1999: Rostselmash Rostov

Senior clubs
- Years: Team
- 1999–2003: Rostov-Don
- 2003–2005: Luch Moscow
- 2005–2019: Rostov-Don
National team
- Years: Team
- 2004–2006: Russia
Medal record
World Championship
Gold medal – first place	Russia 2005	National Team

Elena Vasilievna Slinvinskaya (née Sergeeva, Russian: Елена Васильевна Сливинская (Сергеева), born 9 May 1980) is a Russian former handball player. She was part of the Russian team that won the 2005 World Women's Handball Championship.

== Career ==
Slinvinskaya started playing handball at school, before joining the youth team of Rostselmash Rostov, where she made her senior debut in 2001.

In 2003 she joined Luch Moscow, where she played until 2005, before returning to Rostov-Don.

She won 4 Russian Championships and the Russian Women's Handball Cup 9 times while at the club retired in 2019 after having won the Russian Championship. in her last season.

== National team ==
Slinvinskaya represented Russia at the 2004 European Women's Handball Championship, where Russia finished 4th, losing to Denmark in the semifinal and to Hungary in the third place play-off.

A year later she was part of the Russian team that won the 2005 World Women's Handball Championship at home. She played 10 matches, scoring 10 goals.

Slinvinskaya also played for the Russian beach national team, where she won the 2002 and 2006 European Championships.

== Private ==
Slinvinskaya is of Karelian descent.
