= Pearl van der Wissel =

Dutch handball player (born 1984)

Personal information
- Full name: Pearl van der Wissel-Nielsen
- Nationality: Dutch
- Born: 14 April 1984 (age 42) Leiden, Netherlands
- Height: 1.71 m (5 ft 7 in)

Sport
- Sport: Handball
- Position: Centre back

Senior clubs
- Years: Team
- 2000-2001: VOC Amsterdam
- 2001-2002: Omni SV Hellas
- 2002-2009: GOG Svendborg
- 2009-2010: Toulon Handball
- 2010-2011: Thüringer HC
- 2011-2012: SK Aarhus
- 2012-2018: Odense Håndbold
National team
Years	Team	Apps	(Gls)
1999-2017	Netherlands	217	(560)
Medal record
World Championship
Bronze medal – third place	2017 Germany

Pearl van der Wissel (born 14 April 1984) is a former Dutch handballer, who played for the Dutch national handball team, where she in 2017 was part of the team that won bronze medals at the 2017 World Championship.

== Career ==
Pearl van der Wissel played in her home country for UDSV, Aalsmeer, Orient, VOC Amsterdam and Omni sportverenigung Hellas. In 2002 she won the Dutch championship with Hellas. Afterwards she joined Danish side GOG Håndbold, where she won the 2005 Danish Cup. After 7 years in Denmark, she joined French side Toulon Handball, where she won the French championship in 2010. After a season in France she joined German side Thüringer HC. Here she won the 2011 German championship and DHB-Pokal double.

In 2011 she returned to Denmark to join SK Aarhus. A year later she joined league rivals HC Odense. She retired after the 2014–15 season, but came back to Odense after Nadia Offendal had suffered a knee injury. She ended her career in 2018 for good.
