= Nina Kamto Njitam =

French handball player (born 1983)

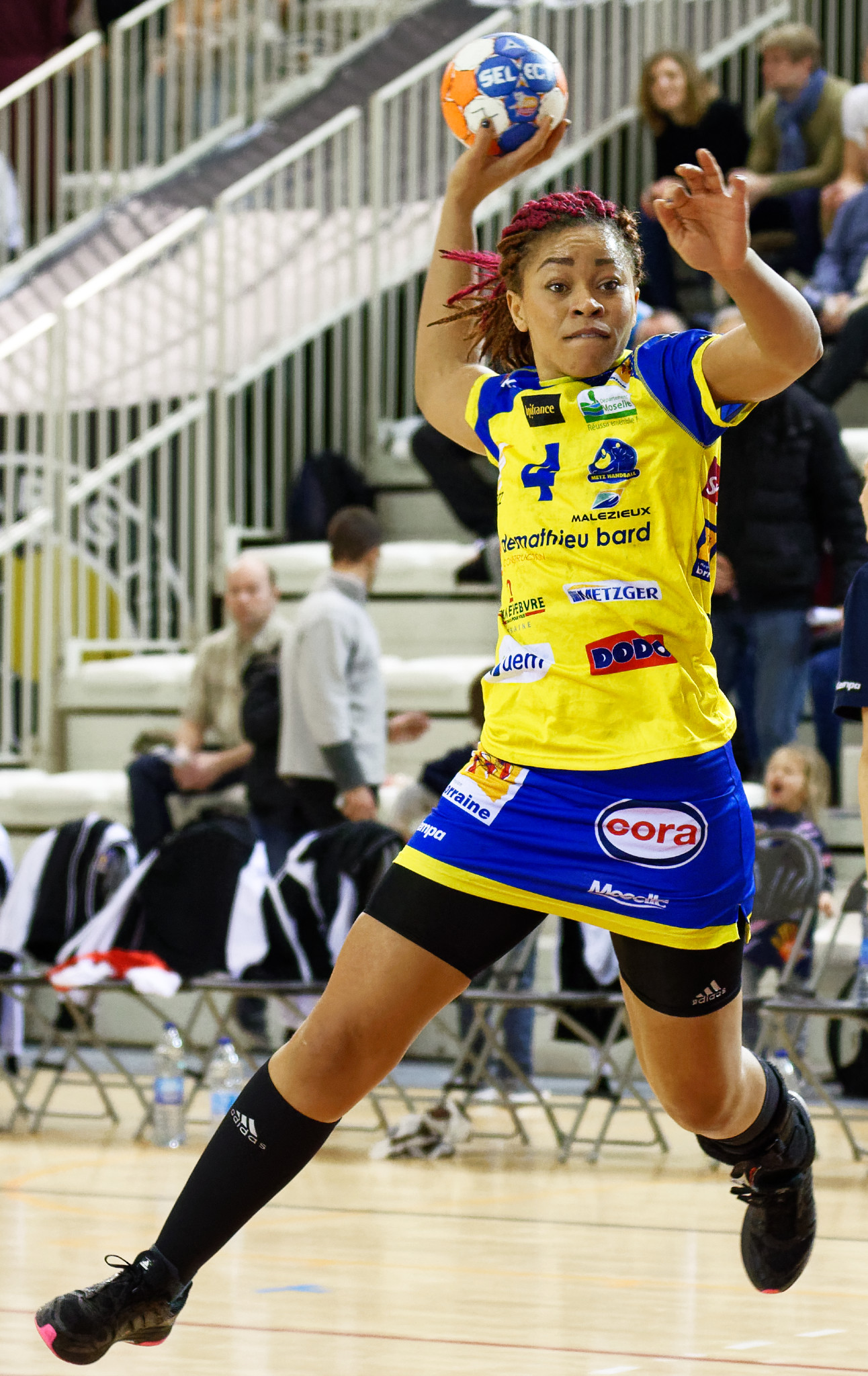

Personal information
- Nationality: French
- Born: 25 June 1983 (age 43) Yaoundé, Cameroon
- Height: 1.78 m (5 ft 10 in)

Sport
- Sport: Handball
- Position: Pivot
National team
Years	Team	Apps	(Gls)
–	France	214	(410)
Medal record
World Championship
Silver medal – second place	2011 Brazil

Nina Kamto Njitam (born 25 June 1983) is a French handball player, born in Cameroon. She plays for the French national team. She participated at the 2008 Summer Olympics in China, where the French team placed fifth, and in the 2012 Summer Olympics, where the French team also finished in 5th.

== Individual awards ==
- French Championship Best Defender: 2014
