= Nikica Pušić-Koroljević =

Croatian handball player (born 1983)

Nikica Pušić-Koroljević (born 19 March 1983 in Požega) is a former Croatian team handball player. She played for the Croatian national team, and participated at the 2011 World Women's Handball Championship in Brazil, and 2012 Summer Olympics. She last played for the club RK Podravka Koprivnica.
