= Anastasiia Pidpalova =

Ukrainian handball player

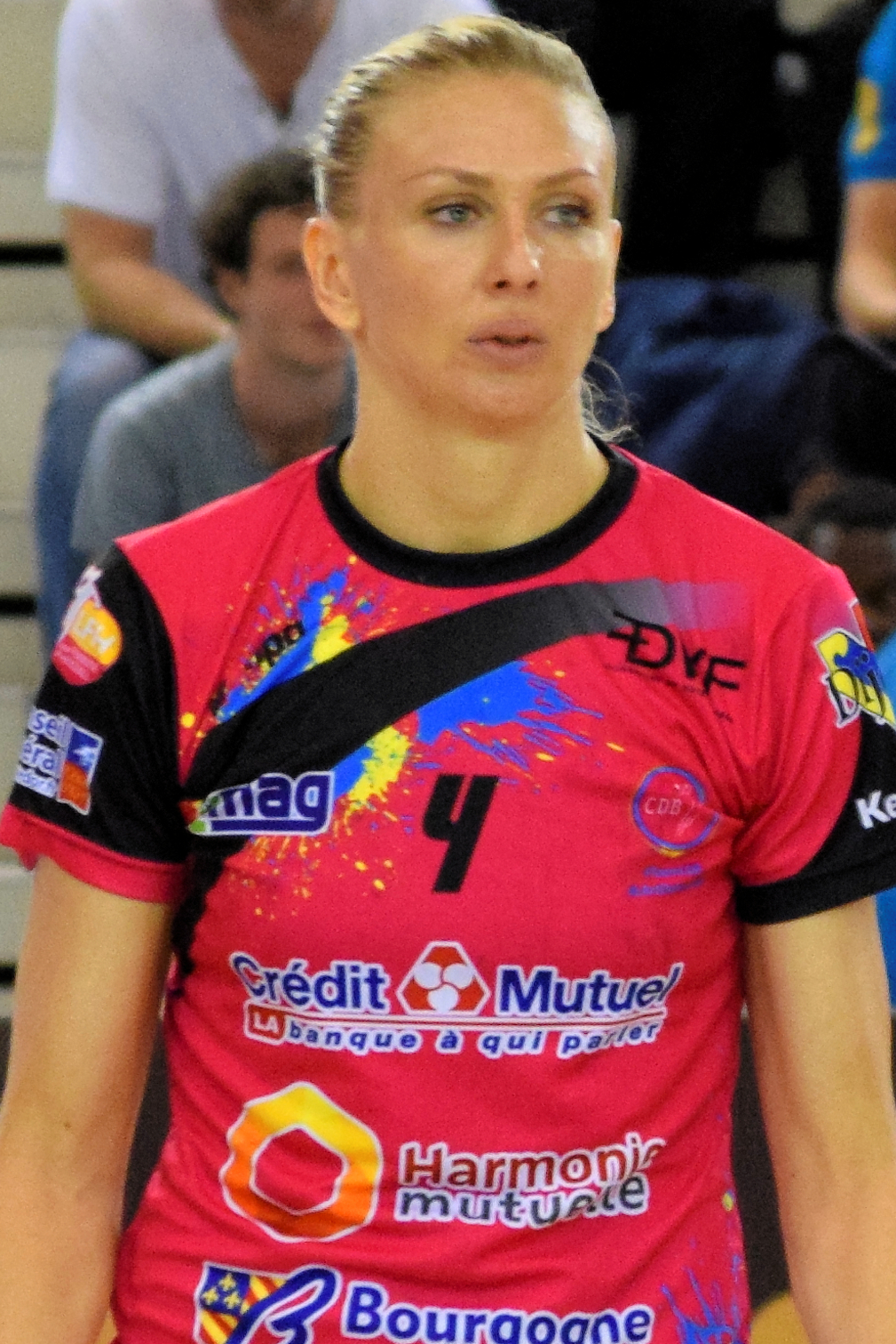

Personal information
- Nationality: Ukrainian
- Born: 5 January 1982 (age 44) Kherson, Ukrainian SSR, Soviet Union
- Height: 1.92 m (6 ft 4 in)

Sport
- Sport: Handball
- Position: Left back
- Current club: Le Havre

Senior clubs
- Years: Team
- 2002–2003: HC Dnepryanka
- 2003–2009: HC Motor
- 2009–2011: CS Oltchim Râmnicu Vâlcea
- 2011–2013: Dinamo Volgograd
- 2013: Metz Handball
- 2013–2014: Brest Bretagne Handball
- 2014–2016: Cercle Dijon Bourgogne
- 2016-2017: Le Havre
National team
Years	Team	Apps	(Gls)
–	Ukraine	63	(220)
Medal record
Olympic Games
Bronze medal – third place	2004 Athens	Team

Anastasiia Pidpalova (born Anastasiia Borodina, 5 January 1982) is a Ukrainian former handballer, who played for the Ukrainian national team.

She received a bronze medal with the Ukrainian national team at the 2004 Summer Olympics in Athens.

== Individual awards ==
- Carpathian Trophy Top Scorer: 2010
