= Nataliya Lyapina =

Ukrainian handball player

Medal record

Representing Ukraine

Women's handball

Olympic Games
Bronze medal – third place	2004 Athens	Team Competition

Nataliya Lyapina, Ukr. Наталія Ляпіна (née Datsenko; born 14 May 1976) is a Ukrainian team handball player. She received a bronze medal with the Ukrainian national team at the 2004 Summer Olympics in Athens.
