= Tereza Pîslaru =

Romanian handball player (born 1982)

Personal information
- Full name: Tereza Tamaș Pîslaru
- Nationality: Romanian
- Born: April 28, 1982 (age 44) Bacău, Romania

Sport
- Sport: Handball
- Position: Goalkeeper
- Current club: Retired

Senior clubs
- Years: Team
- –2007: Oltchim Râmnicu Vâlcea
- 2007–2014: HCM Roman
National team
- Years: Team
- –: Romania

Achievements and titles
- Olympic finals: 2008 Summer Olympics

Tereza Pîslaru (née Tamaș; born 28 April 1982 in Roman, Romania) is a Romanian handball player who plays for HCM Roman.

With the Romanian national team she participated at the 2008 Summer Olympics in China, where Romania placed seventh.
