= Handball at the 2000 Summer Olympics – Women's team rosters =

List of handball players

The following squads and players competed in the women's handball tournament at the 2000 Summer Olympics.

== Angola ==
The following players represented Angola:

- Anica Neto
- Domingas Cordeiro
- Lili Webba-Torres
- Filomena Trindade
- Ilda Bengue
- Ivone Mufuca
- Justina Praça
- Marcelina Kiala
- Maria Inês Jololo
- Odete Tavares
- Maura Faial
- Regina Camumbila
- Teresa Ulundo

== Australia ==
The following players represented Australia:

- Fiona Robinson-Hannan
- Jana Jamnicky (Note: also competed in the 1999 World Women's Handball Championship)
- Janni Bach
- Jovana Milosevic
- Katrina Shinfield
- Kim Briggs
- Lydia Kahmke
- Mari Edland
- Marina Kopcalic
- Petra Besta
- Raelene Boulton
- Rina Bjarnason
- Sarah Hammond
- Shelley Ormes
- Vera Ignjatovic

== Austria ==
The following players represented Austria:

- Ausra Fridrikas
- Barbara Strass
- Doris Meltzer
- Iris Morhammer
- Laura Fritz
- Natalia Rusnatchenko
- Sorina Teodorovic
- Stanka Bozovic
- Steffi Ofenböck
- Svetlana Mugoša-Antić
- Tanja Logvin
- Tatjana Dschandschgawa
- Birgit Engl
- Ariane Maier
- Rima Sypkus

== Brazil ==
The following players represented Brazil:

- Alessandra Medeiros da Oliveira
- Aline Silva
- Chana Masson
- Dilane Roese
- Idalina Mesquita
- Lucila Vianna da Silva
- Meg Montão
- Margarida Conte
- Maria José Batista de Sales
- Rosana de Aleluia
- Sandra de Oliveira
- Valéria de Oliveira
- Viviane Jacques
- Viviani Emerick

== Denmark ==
The following players represented Denmark:

Head coach: Jan Pytlick

No.	Pos.	Name	Date of birth (age)	Height	App.	Goals	Club
1	GK	Lene Rantala	10 August 1968 (aged 32)
2	LB	Katrine Fruelund	12 July 1978 (aged 22)
4	PM	Camilla Andersen	5 July 1973 (aged 27)
5	RB	Mette Vestergaard	27 November 1975 (aged 24)
6	LW	Anette Hoffmann	5 May 1971 (aged 29)
7	LW	Christina Hansen	10 July 1978 (aged 22)
8	RB	Tina Bøttzau	29 August 1971 (aged 29)
9	RW	Janne Kolling	12 July 1968 (aged 32)
11	RW	Anja Nielsen	12 April 1975 (aged 25)
12	GK	Karin Mortensen	26 September 1977 (aged 22)
13	PM	Lotte Kiærskou	23 June 1975 (aged 25)
14	LB	Maja Grønbæk	30 January 1971 (aged 29)
15	P	Tonje Kjærgaard	11 June 1975 (aged 25)
16	GK	Rikke Petersen	14 January 1975 (aged 25)
18	P	Karen Brødsgaard	10 March 1978 (aged 22)

== France ==
The following players represented France:

- Christelle Joseph-Mathieu
- Sonia Cendier Ajaguin
- Isabelle Wendling
- Joanne Dudziak
- Laïsa Lerus
- Leïla Lejeune-Duchemann
- Myriam Korfanty
- Nathalie Selambarom
- Nodjialem Myaro
- Raphaëlle Tervel
- Sandrine Delerce
- Stéphanie Cano
- Stéphanie Ludwig
- Valérie Nicolas
- Véronique Pecqueux-Rolland

== Hungary ==
The following players represented Hungary:

- Beatrix Balogh
- Rita Deli
- Ágnes Farkas
- Andrea Farkas
- Anikó Kántor
- Beatrix Kökény
- Anita Kulcsár
- Dóra Lőwy
- Anikó Nagy
- Ildikó Pádár
- Katalin Pálinger
- Krisztina Pigniczki
- Bojana Radulovics
- Judith Simics
- Beáta Siti

== Norway ==
The following players represented Norway:

- Kristine Duvholt
- Trine Haltvik
- Heidi Tjugum
- Susann Goksør Bjerkrheim
- Ann Cathrin Eriksen
- Kjersti Grini
- Elisabeth Hilmo
- Mia Hundvin
- Tonje Larsen
- Cecilie Leganger
- Jeanette Nilsen
- Marianne Rokne
- Birgitte Sættem
- Monica Sandve
- Else-Marthe Sørlie

== Romania ==
The following players represented Romania:

- Aurelia Stoica
- Valeria Motogna-Beșe
- Cristina Vărzaru
- Cristina Dogaru-Cucuian
- Elena Napăr
- Gabriela Doina Tănaşe
- Lidia Drăgănescu
- Luminită Huţupan-Dinu
- Mihaela Ignat
- Nicoleta Alina Dobrin
- Ramona Farcău
- Steluța Luca
- Talida Tolnai
- Victorina Bora

== South Korea ==
The following players represented South Korea:

- Choi Hyeon-jeong
- Jeong Eun-hui
- Han Seon-hui
- Heo Sun-yeong
- Heo Yeong-suk
- Kim Hyang-gi
- Kim Hyeon-ok
- Kim Jin-sun
- Lee Jeong-yeong
- Lee Nam-su
- Lee Sang-eun
- Mun Gyeong-ha
- Oh Seong-ok
- Oh Yeong-ran
- Park Jeong-hui
