= 1999 World Women's Handball Championship squads =

List of handball players

The following squads and players competed in the World Women's Handball Championship in 1999 in Norway and Denmark.

== Angola ==
1. Justina Jose Joaquim Lopez Praca
2. Maria Tavares
3. Palmira de Almeida
4. Ilda Bengue
5. Filomena Trindade
6. Elisa Webba
7. Anica Miguel Joao Neto
8. Felisbela Teixeira
9. Maria Goncalves
10. Maria Ines Jololo
11. Maura Faial
12. Ivone Mufuca
13. Maria Cordeiro
14. Regina Camumbila

== Argentina ==
1. Sabrina Porini
2. Silvina Suarez
3. Citia Coppes
4. Laura Neumann
5. Laura Alarcon
6. Karina Seif
7. Giselle Pintos
8. Natacha Melillo
9. Astrid Klein
10. Florencia Am
11. Monica Garcia
12. Melisa Bok
13. Gisel Gimenez
14. Daniela Palladino

== Australia ==
1. Rina Bjarnason (Note: also competed in the Handball at the 2000 Summer Olympics - women's competition)
2. Petra Besta
3. Shelley Ormes
4. Sarah Hammond
5. Jana Jamnicky
6. Vanja Karahmetovic
7. Katrina Shinfield
8. Raelene Boulton
9. Jovana Milosevic
10. Lydia Kahmke
11. Mari Edland
12. Sandra Zlatanovski
13. Vera Ignjatovic

== Austria ==
1. Nataliya Rusnatchenko
2. Tatyana Dzhandzhagava
3. Rima Sypkuviene
4. Renata Cieloch
5. Stephanie Ofenböck
6. Svetlana Mugosa Antic
7. Tatjana Logvin
8. Ausra Ziukiene Fridrikas
9. Beatrice Wagner
10. Stanca Bozovic
11. Iris Morhammer
12. Barbara Strass
13. Sorina Lefter Teodorovic
14. Birgit Engl
15. Doris Meltzer

== Belarus ==
1. Natalia Petrakova
2. Alesia Korabava
3. Kristina Cvatko
4. Alla Vaskova
5. Natallia Sysoyeva
6. Larysa Mehzynskaya
7. Elena Koulik
8. Natalia Artemenko
9. Tatsiana Silitch
10. Tatsisna Khlimankova
11. Irina Kalpakova
12. Svetlana Minevskaya
13. Natalia Tsvirko
14. Ludmilla Yermachuk
15. Hanna Malinskaya
16. Natalia Anisimova

== Brazil ==
1. Chana Masson
2. Margarida Conte
3. Ariane Roese
4. Sandra De Oliveira
5. Idalina Borges Mesquita
6. Lucia Da Silva
7. Eva P. Fernandes Freire
8. Valeria De Oliveira
9. Maria Jose Batista De Sales
10. Ana Maria Da Silva
11. Margarita Lobo Montao
12. Eliane Pereira
13. Viviane Taques
14. Viviani Emerick

== China ==
1. Yu Geli
2. Fan Jie
3. Yanyan Tang
4. Ji Chen
5. Chao Zhai
6. Li Jianfang
7. Li Bing
8. Ying Zhao
9. Jie Cai
10. Lie Chen
11. Yang Li
12. Chen Haiyun
13. Chen Bangping
14. Min Wang

== Republic of Congo ==
1. Patricia Yendea
2. Lucia Chantal Okonatha
3. Moukale (=Chandra Moukila?)
4. Ntsinkana
5. Ngayila
6. Bouanga
7. Bapele
8. Traore
9. Léontine Kibamba Nkembo
10. Kagni
11. Gisèle Donguet
12. Aurèle Itoua-Atsono
13. Andomdin
14. Nadia Loubaki
15. Mbokewa
16. Nathalie Ngayilolo

== Czech Republic ==
1. Lenka Černá
2. Gabriela Buchtova
3. Zuzana Pospisilova
4. Petra Valova
5. Erika Polozova
6. Nadezda Krejcirikova
7. Renata Motalova
8. Monika Ludmilova
9. Lenka Romanova
10. Jarmila Majickova
11. Petra Cumplova
12. Katerina Citkova
13. Renata Filipova
14. Gabriela Korandova
15. Renata Tarhaiova

== Denmark ==
1. Gitte Sunesen
2. Lene Rantala
3. Lotte Faldborg Kiærskou
4. Camilla Andersen
5. Anja Nielsen
6. Katrine Fruelund
7. Christina Roslyng Hansen
8. Line Daugaard
9. Mette Vestergaard
10. Tonje Kjærgaard
11. Merete Møller
12. Kristine Andersen
13. Natasja Dybmose
14. Maja Grønbæk
15. Louise Pedersen
16. Pernille Hansen

== France ==
1. Marie-Annick Dézert
2. Valérie Nicolas
3. Sonia Cendier
4. Leila Duchemann
5. Nodjalem Myaro
6. Véronique Pecqueux
7. Stéphanie Cano
8. Isabelle Wendling
9. Chantal Maio
10. Nathalie Selambarom
11. Véronique Demonière
12. Laisa Lerus
13. Alexandra Hector
14. Sandrine Mariot Delerce
15. Christelle Mathieu
16. Stéphanie Ludwig

== Germany ==
1. Michaela Schanze (GK)
2. Christine Lindemann (GK)
3. Anja Unger (LW)
4. Grit Jurack (RB)
5. Bianca Urbanke (RB)
6. Janet Grunow (LP)
7. Carola Ciszewski (LP)
8. Renata Hodak-Maier (LB)
9. Nikola Pietzsch (LB)
10. Rasa Schulskyte (LB)
11. Andrea Bölk (CB)
12. Agnieszka Tobiasz (RW)
13. Ingrida Radzeviciute (LB)
14. Nadine Härdter (LW)
15. Kathrin Blacha (LP)
16. Turid Arndt (GK)

== Hungary ==
1. Andrea Farkas (GK)
2. Katalina Pálinger (GK)
3. Beatrix Balogh (RW)
4. Anikó Kántor (RW)
5. Anikó Nagy (RB)
6. Beatrix Kökény (CB)
7. Beáta Siti (CB)
8. Anita Kulcsár (LP)
9. Ildikó Pádár (LP)
10. Ágnes Farkas (LB)
11. Rita Deli (LB)
12. Gabriella Takács (LW)
13. Judit Simics (LB)
14. Dóra Lőwy (LW)
15. Nikolett Brigovácz (RB)
16. Krisztina Pigniczki (CB)

== Ivory Coast ==
1. Elisabeth Kouassi
2. Elisabeth Sokoury
3. Catherine Seri Tape
4. Namama Fadika
5. Marie-Ange Gogbe
6. Etche Philomène Koko
7. Celine Affoua Dongo
8. Paula Arlette Gondo
9. Alice Koudougnon
10. Mamba Diomande
11. Nathalie Yohoun Kregbo

== Japan ==
1. Ayako Yamaguchi
2. Michiko Yamshita
3. Masako Okidoi
4. Emiko Kamide
5. Mariko Matsumoto
6. Mineko Tanaka
7. Mariko Komatsu
8. Yumiko Tanaka
9. Tomomi Nakamura
10. Miyoko Tanaka
11. Reiko Yamashita
12. Akane Aoto
13. Mitsuko Kurachi
14. Naomi Miyamoto
15. Yuko Kumagai

== Macedonia ==
1. Oksana Maslova
2. Gordana Naceva
3. Indira Kastratovic
4. Biljana Naumoska
5. Anzela Platon
6. Mirjana Cupic
7. Marina Abramova
8. Larisa Kiselova
9. Nadja Tasci
10. Ljubica Georgievska
11. Klara Boeva
12. Mileva Velkova
13. Biljana Risteska
14. Olgica Todorovska

== Netherlands ==
1. Joke Nynke Tienstra
2. Ingeborg Vlietstra
3. Diane Ordelmans Roelofsen
4. Saskia Mulder
5. Diane Lamein
6. Monique Feijen
7. Ana Razdorov
8. Martine Hekman
9. Marieke Van Linder
10. Nicole Heuwekemeijer
11. Natasja Burgers
12. Olga Anne Maria Assink
13. Elly an de Boer
14. Heidi Veltmaat

== Norway ==
1. Cecilie Leganger
2. Heidi Tjugum
3. Susann Goksør Bjerkrheim
4. Else-Marthe Sørlie
5. Kjersti Grini
6. Trine Haltvik
7. Tonje Larsen
8. Elisabeth Hilmo
9. Kristine Duvholt
10. Mette Davidsen
11. Jeanette Nilsen
12. Ann Cathrin Eriksen
13. Mia Hundvin
14. Sahra Hausmann
15. Birgitte Sættem
16. Marianne Rokne

== Poland ==
1. Iwona Pabich
2. Magdalena Chemicz
3. Agnieszka Truszynska
4. Monika Marzec
5. Joanna Jurkiewicz
6. Agnieszka Golinska
7. Anna Garwacka
8. Sabina Wlodek
9. Agnieszka Beata Matuszewska
10. Iwona Blaszkowska
11. Renata Zukiel
12. Anna Ejsmont
13. Krystyna Wasiuk
14. Izabela Czapko
15. Aleksandra Pawelska
16. Justyna Sebrala

== Romania ==
1. Ildiko Kerekes
2. Luminita Hutupan
3. Valentina Cozma
4. Mihaela Ignat
5. Marinela Patru
6. Carmen Andreea Amariei
7. Sanda Criste
8. Gabriela Doina Tanase
9. Aurelia Stoica
10. Alina Nicoleta Dobrin
11. Cristina Georgiana Varzaru
12. Steluta Lazar Luca
13. Ramona Farcau
14. Talida Tolnai

== Russia ==
1. Nigina Saidova
2. Svetlana Rozimtseva
3. Ekaterina Koulaguina
4. Natalya Deryugina
5. Oksana Romenskaya
6. Zhanna Kashel
7. Tatiana Diadetchko
8. Liudmila Pazitch
9. Svetlana Mozgovaya
10. Marina Naukovich
11. Svetlana Smirnova
12. Elena Chaoussova
13. Lyudmyla Shevchenko
14. Irina Poltoratskaya
15. Svetlana Priakhina
16. Inna Suslina

== South Korea ==
1. Nam-Soo Lee
2. Min-Hee Lee
3. Hye-Jeong Kwag
4. Soon-Young Huh
5. Hyun-Ok Kim
6. Young-Sook Huh
7. Hyang-Ki Kim
8. Jeong-Ho Hong
9. Sun-Hee Han
10. Sun-Young Jang
11. Sang-Eun Lee
12. Hyun-Jung Choi
13. Gyeong-Ja Moon
14. Eun-Gyung Kim

== Ukraine ==
1. Nataliya Sen
2. Tetyana Vorozhtsova
3. Nataliya Derepasko
4. Maryna Vergelyuk
5. Olena Iatsenko
6. Oksana Sakada
7. Nataliya Martynienko
8. Tetiana Brabinko-Salogub
9. Galyna Markushevska
10. Vita Markova
11. Ganna Syukalo
12. Oksana Raykhel
13. Iryna Honcharova
14. Olena Reznir
15. Larissa Kovaleva
