= 2001 World Women's Handball Championship squads =

List of handball players

The following squads and players competed in the World Women's Handball Championship in 2001 in Italy.

== Angola ==
1. Justina Praça
2. Maria Odeth Tavares
3. Filomena Trindade
4. Maria Teresa Neto Joaquim
5. Elisa Webba-Torres
6. Ilda Maria Bengue
7. Marcelina Kiala
8. Domingas Cordeiro
9. Ivone Mufuca
10. Conceição Francisco
11. Elzira Tavares
12. Rosa Amaral
13. Maria Gonçalves
14. Teresa Ulundo
15. Nair Almeida

== Austria ==
1. Nataliya Rusnatchenko
2. Beate Hofmann
3. Sylvia Strass
4. Birgit Engl
5. Rima Sypkuviene-Sypkus
6. Stephanie Ofenböck
7. Sorina Teodorovic
8. Ausra Fridrikas
9. Edith Mika
10. Laura Fritz
11. Katrin Engel
12. Dagmar Müller
13. Alexandra Materzok
14. Ariane Maier
15. Barbara Strass

== Brazil ==
1. Darly Zoqbi de Paula
2. Margarida Conte
3. Chana Franciela Masson de Souza
4. Ana Maria Silva
5. Maria José Sales
6. Celia Costa
7. Ariana Roese
8. Silvia Helena Araujo Pinheiro
9. Valeria De Oliveira
10. Lucila da Silva
11. Aline Silva dos Santos
12. Daniela De Oliveira Piedade
13. Alina Waleska Lopes Rosas
14. Idalina Borges Mesquita
15. Sandra de Oliveira
16. Katia Souza

== China ==
1. Hai Yun Chen
2. Wei Shi
3. Ge Li Yu
4. Chao Zhai
5. Wu Yahan
6. Ying Zhao
7. Pei Li Long
8. Yang Li
9. Jie Cai
10. Hai Yun Chen
11. Hong Xia Zhu
12. Weiwei Li
13. Xiao Jiong Wang

== Denmark ==
1. Lene Rantala
2. Karin Mortensen
3. Rikke Poulsen Schmidt
4. Mette Vestergaard
5. Ditte Andersen
6. Christina Roslyng Hansen
7. Mette Melgaard
8. Katrine Fruelund
9. Louise Pedersen
10. Pernille Hansen
11. Rikke Hørlykke Jørgensen
12. Lotte Faldborg Kiaerskou
13. Kristine Andersen
14. Heidi Johansen
15. Line Daugaard
16. Maria Josephine Touray

== France ==
1. Valérie Nicolas
2. Joanne Dudziak
3. Leila Duchemann-Lejeune
4. Raphaelle Tervel
5. Sonia Cendier
6. Stéphanie Cano
7. Myriam Korfanty
8. Stéphanie Ludwig
9. Isabelle Wendling
10. Nodjalem Myaro
11. Myriame Said Mohamed
12. Stéphanie Moreau
13. Stéphanie Norval-Tabard
14. Nathalie Selambarom
15. Seynabou Benga
16. Sophie Herbrecht

== Greenland ==
1. Kista Isaksen
2. Rita Egede
3. Ella Grodem
4. Karen Marie Kyed
5. Nada Frank Hansen
6. Ivalu Kleist
7. Mai Hygum Andersen
8. Arnarissoq Jakobsen
9. Bodil Tejg Krunderup
10. Kamilla Jensen
11. Laila Skytte
12. Marianne Clausen
13. Pilnnguaq Magnussen
14. Linda Lyberth
15. Nivi Heiman
16. Ulla Nielsen

== Hungary ==
1. Katalin Pálinger
2. Tímea Sugár
3. Andrea Farkas
4. Beatrix Balogh
5. Beáta Siti
6. Gabriella Kindl
7. Ágnes Farkas
8. Eszter Siti
9. Erika Kirsner
10. Bojana Radulovics
11. Rita Borók
12. Anita Kulcsár
13. Rita Deli
14. Ildikó Pádár
15. Krisztina Pigniczki
16. Zsuzsanna Pálffy

== Italy ==
1. Verena Wolf
2. Adele de Santis
3. Valeria Muretto
4. Daniela Russo
5. Martina Pascazio
6. Elena Barani
7. Zsuzsanna Csoma
8. Luana Pistelli
9. Elisabetta Trotta
10. Laura Profili
11. Francesca Celotto
12. Michaela Cavenaghi
13. Emanuela Avallone
14. Martina Pascazio
15. Natalya Anysenkova
16. Rossana Mangano

== Japan ==
1. Michiko Yamashita
2. Mineko Tanaka
3. Kimiko Hida
4. Akane Aoto
5. Mami Tanaka
6. Mitsuko Kurashi
7. Masayo Oishi
8. Sachie Sumi
9. Emiko Matsunaga
10. Reiko Yamashita
11. Hirono Yaka
12. Hitomi Sakugawa
13. Akiko Kinjo
14. Tomoko Sakamoto
15. Eiko Yamada
16. Hisayo Taniguchi

== Macedonia ==
1. Oksana Maslova
2. Tanja Andrejeva
3. Gordana Naceva
4. Indira Kastratović
5. Dana Filipovska
6. Biljana Naumoska
7. Dragana Pecevska
8. Valentina Radulović
9. Biljana Savevska
10. Ljubica Georgjievska
11. Biljana Crvenkoska
12. Biljana Risteska
13. Mileva Velkova
14. Marija Papudzijeva

== Netherlands ==
1. Joke Nynke Tienstra
2. Ingeborg Vlietstra
3. Saskia Mulder
4. Olga Anne Maria Assink
5. Natasja Burgers
6. Irina Pusic
7. Elly An de Boer
8. Monique Feijen
9. Ana Razdorov
10. Diane Lamein
11. Sylvia Hofman
12. Nicole Heuwekemeijer
13. Pearl Chantal Van der Wissel
14. Diane Ordelmans-Roelofsen

== Norway ==
1. Mimi J. Kopperud Slevigen
2. Cecilie Leganger
3. Kjersti Grini
4. Heidi Aassveen Halvorsen
5. Kristine Lunde
6. Kristine Duvholt Havnas
7. Unni Nyhamar Hinkel
8. Else-Marthe Sörlie-Lybekk
9. Monica Sandve
10. Gro Hammerseng
11. Janne Tuven
12. Elisabeth Hilmo
13. Marianne Rokne
14. Hanne Halen
15. Vigdis Haarsaker

== Republic of the Congo ==
1. Patricia Yende
2. Lucia Chantal Okonatha
3. Clarisse Opondzo
4. Ngamabana Menet
5. Ndona Bassarila
6. Chandra Moukila
7. Lèontine Kibamba Nkembo
8. Nathalie Ngayilolo
9. Rose Angèle Mbokewa
10. Aurelle Itoua Atsono
11. Raissa Bitsere
12. Chantal Okoye Mbon
13. Nadia Loubacky
14. Hawaa Okongo
15. Amèlia Okombi-Moua
16. Patricia Mayoulou

== Romania ==
1. Luminita Hutupan Dinu
2. Ildiko Kerekes
3. Tereza Tamas
4. Carmen Liliana Nitescu
5. Cristina Dumitrescu
6. Simona Silvia Gogirla
7. Alina Nicoleta Dobrin
8. Steluta Luca
9. Aurelia Stoica
10. Nicoleta Cristina Gisca
11. Carmen Andreea Amariei
12. Luminita Simona Chiriev
13. Florina Mirela Nicolescu
14. Carmen Lungu
15. Gianina Florii Toncean
16. Cristina Varzaru

== Russia ==
1. Tatiana Alizar
2. Inna Suslina
3. Raisa Verakso
4. Natalia Gontcharova
5. Svetlana Bogdanova
6. Elena Tschauossova
7. Oksana Romenskaya
8. Anna Kareeva
9. Liudmila Bodnieva
10. Nadezda Muravyeva
11. Anna Ignattchenko
12. Tatiana Diadetchko
13. Alina Dolgikh
14. Irina Poltoratskaya
15. Irina Prashkova
16. Svetlana Smirnova

== Slovenia ==
1. Nada Tutnjic
2. Sergeja Stefanisin
3. Olga Ceckova
4. Branka Mijatovic
5. Mojca Dercar
6. Deja Doler
7. Silvana Ilic
8. Spela Cerar
9. Tanja Dajcman
10. Vesna Vincic-Pus
11. Inna Dolgun
12. Mira Vincic
13. Nadija Plesko
14. Barbara Gorski
15. Tatjana Oder
16. Anja Freser

== South Korea ==
1. Nam-Soo Lee
2. Kyeong-Ha Moon
3. Soon-Young Huh
4. Yoon-Jung Lee
5. So-Hee Jang
6. Pil-Hee Moon
7. Jung-Young Lee
8. Bok-Hee Myoung
9. Sun-Hee Woo
10. Sung-Hee An
11. Im-Jeong Choi
12. Ji-Hey Kang
13. Eun-Hee Chung
14. Myung-Hee Son
15. Sin-Young Pak

== Spain ==
1. Elisabet Lopez Valledor
2. Aitziber Elejaga Vargas
3. Noelia Oncina Morena
4. Nataliya Morskova
5. Marta Mangue Gonzales
6. Izaskun Mugica
7. Cristina Esmeralda Lopez Quiros
8. Maria Teresa Andreu Rodgriuez
9. Cristina Gomez Arquer
10. Ana Isabel Ruiz Perez
11. Diana Box Alonso
12. Tatiana Garmendia
13. Silvia Del Olmo Escudero
14. Montserrat Puche Diaz
15. Susana Pareja Ibarra
16. Susana Fraile Celaya

== Sweden ==
1. Madelene Grundström
2. Asa Elisabeth Eriksson
3. Katarina Arfwidsson
4. Veronica Isaksson
5. Theresa Claesson
6. Madelene Olsson
7. Asa Lundmark
8. Anna Ljungdahl
9. Kristina Linea Flognman
10. Jenny Lindblom
11. Jennie Florin
12. Linda Nilsson
13. Karin Almqvist
14. Lina Möller
15. Karin Nilsson

== Tunisia ==
1. Nour Ghamman
2. Sonia Ghribi
3. Ibtissem Toumi
4. Mouna Bin Halima
5. Ibitissem Gmessaouda
6. Hela Msaad
7. Sinem Aouini
8. Raoudha Dridi
9. Rym Manai
10. Amira Fekin Romdhane
11. Haifa Abdelhak
12. Rafika Marzouk
13. Mouna Chebbah
14. Raja Toumi

== Ukraine ==
1. Nataliya Borysenko
2. Tetyana Vorozhtsova
3. Iryna Hontcharova
4. Vita Markova
5. Tetyana Nykytenko
6. Olena Iatsenko
7. Tetyana Sytnyk
8. Anastasia Borodina
9. Oksana Raykhel
10. Olena Reznir
11. Ganna Syukalo
12. Galyna Markushevska
13. Liliya Stolpakova
14. Larya Kharlanyuk
15. Olena Radchenko

== Uruguay ==
1. N’Haloy Laicouschi
2. Maria Lorena Estefanell
3. Daniela Mata
4. Sofia Griot Gayoso
5. Veronica Tessmann
6. Fabiana Benvenuto
7. Mercedes Amor
8. Veronica Castro
9. Jussara Castro
10. Silvana Renom
11. Silvana De Armas
12. Yanina Noveri
13. Maria Noel Uriarte
14. Mercedes Amor Estrago
15. Mariana Fleitas Riera
16. Jimena Martinez
17. Marcela Schelotto Musetti

== Yugoslavia ==
1. Zlata Paplacko
2. Tatjana Medved
3. Sanja Jovović
4. Sandra Kolaković
5. Ljiljana Knežević
6. Biljana Balać
7. Branka Jovanović
8. Snežana Damjanac
9. Maja Savić
10. Aida Selmanović
11. Emina Krasnić
12. Bojana Petrović
13. Milanka Čelebić
14. Tanja Milanović
15. Olivera Mugoša
16. Dragica Miličković

Coach: Milorad Milatović
