= Chen Ji =

Chen Ji may refer to:

- Chen Ji (Yuanfang) (陳紀), courtesy name Yuanfang (元方), Eastern Han dynasty official, father of Chen Qun
- Chen Ji (陳紀), official serving under the Eastern Han dynasty warlord Yuan Shu
- Chen Ji (handballer) (陈积; born 1976), handball player
- Chen Ji (footballer) (陈吉; born 1997), football player
- Chen Ji (陳紀), a term referring to the volumes chronicling the history of the Chen dynasty (557–589) in the Zizhi Tongjian
