= Alessandra Oliveira =

Alessandra Oliveira may refer to:

- Alessandra Medeiros, Brazilian handball player
- Alessandra Oliveira (swimmer), Brazilian Paralympic swimmer
- Alessandra Santos de Oliveira, Brazilian basketball player
