= Handball at the 2004 Summer Olympics – Women's tournament =

2004 Women's Olympic handball tournament
Tournament details
- Host country: Greece
- Venues: 2 (in 1 host city)
- Dates: 14–29 August 2004
- Teams: 10 (from 4 confederations)

Final positions
- Champions: Denmark (3rd title)
- Runners-up: South Korea
- Third place: Ukraine
- Fourth place: France

Tournament statistics
- Matches played: 33
- Top scorer(s): (Hungary) Bojana Radulović (54 goals)

Awards
- Best player: (Denmark) Katrine Fruelund

The Handball competition at the 2004 Summer Olympics for women took place in the Sports Pavilion at the Faliro Coastal Zone Olympic Complex for the preliminary competition. From the quarter-final stage onwards the women's event moved to the Helliniko Olympic Indoor Arena.

The women's event involved ten teams split in two groups:
Group A: Brazil, China, Greece, Hungary, and Ukraine
Group B: Angola, Denmark, France, South Korea, and Spain.

Denmark won gold medals after beating South Korea in the final 38-36 after extra time and penalty shoot-out. This made Denmark the first nation to win three straight Olympic gold medals.

== Medalists ==
Gold	Silver	Bronze
Denmark; Louise Bager Nørgaard; Rikke Skov; Henriette Mikkelsen; Mette Vestergaard; Rikke Hørlykke; Camilla Thomsen; Karin Mortensen; Lotte Kiærskou; Trine Jensen; Katrine Fruelund; Rikke Petersen-Schmidt; Kristine Andersen; Karen Brødsgaard; Line Daugaard; Josephine Touray	South Korea; Oh Yong-ran; Woo Sun-hee; Huh Soon-young; Lee Gong-joo; Jang So-hee; Kim Hyun-ok; Kim Cha-youn; Oh Seong-ok; Huh Young-sook; Moon Kyeong-ha; Lim O-kyeong; Lee Sang-eun; Myoung Bok-hee; Choi Im-jeong; Moon Pil-hee	Ukraine; Nataliya Borysenko; Ganna Burmystrova; Tetyana Shynkarenko; Maryna Vergelyuk; Olena Yatsenko; Ganna Siukalo; Olena Radchenko; Olena Tsyhytsia; Galyna Markushevska; Lyudmyla Shevchenko; Iryna Honcharova; Nataliya Lyapina; Anastasiya Borodina; Larysa Zaspa; Oxana Rayhel

== Qualification ==
Mean of qualification	Date	Host	Vacancies	Qualified
Host nation	5 September 1997	(Switzerland) Lausanne	1	Greece
2002 European Championship	6–15 December 2002	Denmark	1	Denmark
2003 Pan American Games	2–12 August 2003	(Dominican Republic) Santo Domingo	1	Brazil
African qualification tournament	18–21 September 2003	(Angola) Luanda	1	Angola
Asian qualification tournament	23–28 September 2003	Japan	1	China
2003 World Championship	2–14 December 2003	Croatia	5	France; Hungary; South Korea; Ukraine; Spain
Total			10	

== Group stage ==
All times are local (UTC+3).

=== Group A ===
Pos	Team	Pld	W	D	L	GF	GA	GD	Pts	Qualification
1	Ukraine	4	4	0	0	99	82	+17	8	Quarterfinals
2	Hungary	4	3	0	1	118	93	+25	6	Quarterfinals
3	China	4	2	0	2	106	90	+16	4	Quarterfinals
4	Brazil	4	1	0	3	97	105	−8	2	Quarterfinals
5	Greece (H)	4	0	0	4	74	124	−50	0	

Rules for classification: 1) Points; 2) Head-to-head points; 3) Head-to-head goal difference; 4) Head-to-head goals scored; 5) Goal difference; 6) Goals scored; 7) Draw.
(H) Hosts

15 August 2004; 14:30	China	24–28	Hungary	Sports Pavilion; Referees: Aly Hassan, Yasser (EGY)
15 August 2004; 14:30	Li W. 8	(11–14)	Kulcsár, Radulovics 8	Sports Pavilion; Referees: Aly Hassan, Yasser (EGY)
15 August 2004; 14:30	4× (yellow card) 11× (suspension)		3× (yellow card) 11× (suspension)	Sports Pavilion; Referees: Aly Hassan, Yasser (EGY)

15 August 2004; 16:30	Greece	21–29	Brazil	Sports Pavilion, Athens; Referees: Baum, Góralczyk (POL)
15 August 2004; 16:30	Gioupi 6	(8–14)	Piedade 7	Sports Pavilion, Athens; Referees: Baum, Góralczyk (POL)
15 August 2004; 16:30	3× (yellow card) 7× (suspension)		3× (yellow card) 5× (suspension)	Sports Pavilion, Athens; Referees: Baum, Góralczyk (POL)

17 August 2004; 14:30	Ukraine	26–21	China	Sports Pavilion; Referees: Bretó, Huelin (ESP)
17 August 2004; 14:30	Rayhel 9	(15-10)	Li W. 7	Sports Pavilion; Referees: Bretó, Huelin (ESP)
17 August 2004; 14:30	3× (yellow card) 5× (suspension)		3× (yellow card) 4× (suspension)	Sports Pavilion; Referees: Bretó, Huelin (ESP)

17 August 2004; 16:30	Hungary	33–20	Greece	Sports Pavilion, Athens; Referees: Gardinovački, Marić (SCG)
17 August 2004; 16:30	Kirsner, Siti 6	(15–9)	Gioupi 8	Sports Pavilion, Athens; Referees: Gardinovački, Marić (SCG)
17 August 2004; 16:30	3× (yellow card) 4× (suspension)		3× (yellow card) 8× (suspension) 1× (red card)	Sports Pavilion, Athens; Referees: Gardinovački, Marić (SCG)

19 August 2004; 16:30	Greece	13–33	China	Sports Pavilion; Referees: Bord, Buy (FRA)
19 August 2004; 16:30	three players 3	(6–15)	Zhai 7	Sports Pavilion; Referees: Bord, Buy (FRA)
19 August 2004; 16:30	3× (yellow card) 7× (suspension)		2× (yellow card) 4× (suspension)	Sports Pavilion; Referees: Bord, Buy (FRA)

19 August 2004; 19:30	Brazil	19–21	Ukraine	Sports Pavilion, Athens; Referees: Gardinovački, Marić (SCG)
19 August 2004; 19:30	A. Silva 6	(10–10)	Yatsenko, Lyapina 5	Sports Pavilion, Athens; Referees: Gardinovački, Marić (SCG)
19 August 2004; 19:30	3× (yellow card) 4× (suspension)		3× (yellow card) 4× (suspension)	Sports Pavilion, Athens; Referees: Gardinovački, Marić (SCG)

21 August 2004; 16:30	Ukraine	29–20	Greece	Sports Pavilion; Referees: Gardinovački, Marić (SCG)
21 August 2004; 16:30	Lyapina 7	(15–10)	Gkolia 10	Sports Pavilion; Referees: Gardinovački, Marić (SCG)
21 August 2004; 16:30	3× (yellow card) 4× (suspension)		2× (yellow card) 3× (suspension)	Sports Pavilion; Referees: Gardinovački, Marić (SCG)

21 August 2004; 21:30	Brazil	26–35	Hungary	Sports Pavilion, Athens; Referees: Bretó, Huelin (ESP)
21 August 2004; 21:30	A. Silva 8	(14–19)	Radulovics 10	Sports Pavilion, Athens; Referees: Bretó, Huelin (ESP)
21 August 2004; 21:30	3× (yellow card) 4× (suspension)		3× (yellow card) 5× (suspension)	Sports Pavilion, Athens; Referees: Bretó, Huelin (ESP)

23 August 2004; 16:30	China	28–23	Brazil	Sports Pavilion, Athens; Referees: Boye, Jensen (DEN)
23 August 2004; 16:30	Zhai 10	(11–13)	Nascimento 5	Sports Pavilion, Athens; Referees: Boye, Jensen (DEN)
23 August 2004; 16:30	3× (yellow card) 3× (suspension)		3× (yellow card) 4× (suspension)	Sports Pavilion, Athens; Referees: Boye, Jensen (DEN)

23 August 2004; 19:30	Hungary	22–23	Ukraine	Sports Pavilion, Athens; Referees: Øie, Togstad (NOR)
23 August 2004; 19:30	Radulovics 9	(12–8)	Lyapina 8	Sports Pavilion, Athens; Referees: Øie, Togstad (NOR)
23 August 2004; 19:30	2× (yellow card) 7× (suspension)		3× (yellow card) 6× (suspension) 1× (red card)	Sports Pavilion, Athens; Referees: Øie, Togstad (NOR)

=== Group B ===
Pos	Team	Pld	W	D	L	GF	GA	GD	Pts	Qualification
1	South Korea	4	3	1	0	135	103	+32	7 (Note: South Korea 29–29 Denmark)	Quarterfinals
2	Denmark	4	3	1	0	125	98	+27	7	Quarterfinals
3	France	4	2	0	2	105	106	−1	4	Quarterfinals
4	Spain	4	0	1	3	86	110	−24	1 (Note: Spain 24–24 Angola)	Quarterfinals
5	Angola	4	0	1	3	97	131	−34	1	

Rules for classification: 1) Points; 2) Head-to-head points; 3) Head-to-head goal difference; 4) Head-to-head goals scored; 5) Goal difference; 6) Goals scored; 7) Draw.
Notes:

15 August 2004; 19:30	Spain	24–24	Angola	Sports Pavilion, Athens; Referees: Gardinovački, Marić (SCG)
15 August 2004; 19:30	Puche 13	(14–10)	Belezura, Dionísia 5	Sports Pavilion, Athens; Referees: Gardinovački, Marić (SCG)
15 August 2004; 19:30	3× (yellow card) 4× (suspension)		2× (yellow card) 6× (suspension)	Sports Pavilion, Athens; Referees: Gardinovački, Marić (SCG)

15 August 2004; 21:30	Denmark	35–26	France	Sports Pavilion, Athens; Referees: Požežnik, Repenšek (SLO)
15 August 2004; 21:30	Brødsgaard 8	(16–11)	Cendier Ajaguin, Pecqueux-Rolland 4	Sports Pavilion, Athens; Referees: Požežnik, Repenšek (SLO)
15 August 2004; 21:30	4× (yellow card) 3× (suspension)		2× (yellow card) 3× (suspension)	Sports Pavilion, Athens; Referees: Požežnik, Repenšek (SLO)

17 August 2004; 19:30	South Korea	29–29	Denmark	Sports Pavilion, Athens; Referees: Bavas, Migas (GRE)
17 August 2004; 19:30	Woo 8	(14–13)	Kiærskou, Fruelund 7	Sports Pavilion, Athens; Referees: Bavas, Migas (GRE)
17 August 2004; 19:30	3× (yellow card) 7× (suspension)		3× (yellow card) 3× (suspension)	Sports Pavilion, Athens; Referees: Bavas, Migas (GRE)

17 August 2004; 21:30	France	27–20	Spain	Sports Pavilion, Athens; Referees: Lemme, Ullrich (GER)
17 August 2004; 21:30	Lejeune, Tervel 6	(13–10)	Puche 5	Sports Pavilion, Athens; Referees: Lemme, Ullrich (GER)
17 August 2004; 21:30	3× (yellow card) 4× (suspension)		3× (yellow card) 3× (suspension)	Sports Pavilion, Athens; Referees: Lemme, Ullrich (GER)

19 August 2004; 14:30	Angola	30–40	South Korea	Sports Pavilion, Athens; Referees: Nachevski, Nachevski (MKD)
19 August 2004; 14:30	Ilda 11	(12–19)	Oh 10	Sports Pavilion, Athens; Referees: Nachevski, Nachevski (MKD)
19 August 2004; 14:30	3× (yellow card) 1× (suspension)		3× (yellow card) 3× (suspension)	Sports Pavilion, Athens; Referees: Nachevski, Nachevski (MKD)

19 August 2004; 21:30	Spain	21–23	Denmark	Sports Pavilion, Athens; Referees: Aly Hassan, Yasser (EGY)
19 August 2004; 21:30	Mangué 6	(8–14)	Thomsen, Andersen 4	Sports Pavilion, Athens; Referees: Aly Hassan, Yasser (EGY)
19 August 2004; 21:30	3× (yellow card) 5× (suspension)		4× (yellow card) 1× (suspension)	Sports Pavilion, Athens; Referees: Aly Hassan, Yasser (EGY)

21 August 2004; 14:30	Angola	21–29	France	Sports Pavilion, Athens; Referees: Bavas, Migas (GRE)
21 August 2004; 14:30	Ilda 7	(6–12)	Pecqueux-Rolland 8	Sports Pavilion, Athens; Referees: Bavas, Migas (GRE)
21 August 2004; 14:30	3× (yellow card) 3× (suspension)		3× (yellow card) 4× (suspension)	Sports Pavilion, Athens; Referees: Bavas, Migas (GRE)

21 August 2004; 19:30	South Korea	36–21	Spain	Sports Pavilion, Athens; Referees: Požežnik, Repenšek (SLO)
21 August 2004; 19:30	Woo, Lee S 7	(20–7)	Gómez 5	Sports Pavilion, Athens; Referees: Požežnik, Repenšek (SLO)
21 August 2004; 19:30	3× (yellow card) 3× (suspension)		3× (yellow card) 4× (suspension)	Sports Pavilion, Athens; Referees: Požežnik, Repenšek (SLO)

23 August 2004; 14:30	France	23–30	South Korea	Sports Pavilion, Athens; Referees: Arnaldsson, Viðarsson (ISL)
23 August 2004; 14:30	Wendling 8	(13–18)	Lim 8	Sports Pavilion, Athens; Referees: Arnaldsson, Viðarsson (ISL)
23 August 2004; 14:30	3× (yellow card) 3× (suspension)		3× (yellow card) 4× (suspension)	Sports Pavilion, Athens; Referees: Arnaldsson, Viðarsson (ISL)

23 August 2004; 21:30	Denmark	38–22	Angola	Sports Pavilion, Athens; Referees: Bavas, Migas (GRE)
23 August 2004; 21:30	Daugaard 7	(19–8)	Ilda 8	Sports Pavilion, Athens; Referees: Bavas, Migas (GRE)
23 August 2004; 21:30	3× (yellow card) 2× (suspension)		3× (yellow card) 5× (suspension)	Sports Pavilion, Athens; Referees: Bavas, Migas (GRE)

== Knockout stage ==
=== Bracket ===
Quarterfinals
26 August
Ukraine	25
Spain	23
26 August
China	28
Denmark	32
26 August
France	25
Hungary	23
26 August
South Korea	26
Brazil	24

Semifinals
27 August
Ukraine	20
Denmark	29
27 August
France	31
South Korea	32

Gold medal
29 August
Denmark (pen.)	38
South Korea	36
Bronze medal
28 August
Ukraine	21
France	18

5–8th place semifinals
28 August
Spain	27
China	23
28 August
Hungary	36
Brazil	31

Fifth place
29 August
Spain	29
Hungary	38
Seventh place
29 August
China	25
Brazil	26

=== Quarterfinals ===
26 August 2004; 14:30	Ukraine	25–23	Spain	Helliniko Olympic Indoor Arena; Referees: Hansson, Olsson (SWE)
26 August 2004; 14:30	three players 4	(12–9)	Ortuno 6	Helliniko Olympic Indoor Arena; Referees: Hansson, Olsson (SWE)
26 August 2004; 14:30	3× (yellow card) 4× (suspension)		3× (yellow card) 2× (suspension)	Helliniko Olympic Indoor Arena; Referees: Hansson, Olsson (SWE)

26 August 2004; 16:30	France	25–23	Hungary	Helliniko Olympic Indoor Arena; Referees: Bavas, Migas (GRE)
26 August 2004; 16:30	Lejeune 6	(10–13)	Radulović 6	Helliniko Olympic Indoor Arena; Referees: Bavas, Migas (GRE)
26 August 2004; 16:30	4× (yellow card) 6× (suspension)		4× (yellow card) 4× (suspension)	Helliniko Olympic Indoor Arena; Referees: Bavas, Migas (GRE)

26 August 2004; 19:30	South Korea	26–24	Brazil	Helliniko Olympic Indoor Arena; Referees: Bretó, Huelin (ESP)
26 August 2004; 19:30	Lee S 7	(16–9)	L. Silva 7	Helliniko Olympic Indoor Arena; Referees: Bretó, Huelin (ESP)
26 August 2004; 19:30	3× (yellow card) 6× (suspension)		3× (yellow card) 6× (suspension)	Helliniko Olympic Indoor Arena; Referees: Bretó, Huelin (ESP)

26 August 2004; 21:30	China	28–32	Denmark	Helliniko Olympic Indoor Arena; Referees: Požežnik, Repenšek (SLO)
26 August 2004; 21:30	Wang S. 7	(14–18)	Fruelund 7	Helliniko Olympic Indoor Arena; Referees: Požežnik, Repenšek (SLO)
26 August 2004; 21:30	4× (yellow card) 5× (suspension)		2× (yellow card) 3× (suspension)	Helliniko Olympic Indoor Arena; Referees: Požežnik, Repenšek (SLO)

=== 5–8th place semifinals ===
28 August 2004; 09:30	Spain	27–23	China	Helliniko Olympic Indoor Arena; Referees: Aly Hassan, Yasser (EGY)
28 August 2004; 09:30	García, Puche 5	(16–10)	Wang S. 7	Helliniko Olympic Indoor Arena; Referees: Aly Hassan, Yasser (EGY)
28 August 2004; 09:30	4× (yellow card) 2× (suspension)		3× (yellow card) 1× (suspension)	Helliniko Olympic Indoor Arena; Referees: Aly Hassan, Yasser (EGY)

28 August 2004; 11:30	Hungary	36–31	Brazil	Helliniko Olympic Indoor Arena; Referees: Nachevski, Nachevski (MKD)
28 August 2004; 11:30	Radulović 7	(17–14)	Santos 9	Helliniko Olympic Indoor Arena; Referees: Nachevski, Nachevski (MKD)
28 August 2004; 11:30	3× (yellow card) 2× (suspension)		3× (yellow card) 3× (suspension)	Helliniko Olympic Indoor Arena; Referees: Nachevski, Nachevski (MKD)

=== Semifinals ===
27 August 2004; 19:30	France	31–32	South Korea	Helliniko Olympic Indoor Arena; Referees: Øie, Togstad (NOR)
27 August 2004; 19:30	Pecqueux-Rolland, Cano 6	(10–13)	Lee G 7	Helliniko Olympic Indoor Arena; Referees: Øie, Togstad (NOR)
27 August 2004; 19:30	3× (yellow card) 4× (suspension)		3× (yellow card) 3× (suspension)	Helliniko Olympic Indoor Arena; Referees: Øie, Togstad (NOR)

27 August 2004; 21:30	Ukraine	20–29	Denmark	Helliniko Olympic Indoor Arena; Referees: Lemme, Ullrich (GER)
27 August 2004; 21:30	Lyapina 5	(11–13)	Fruelund 9	Helliniko Olympic Indoor Arena; Referees: Lemme, Ullrich (GER)
27 August 2004; 21:30	4× (yellow card) 4× (suspension)		3× (yellow card) 2× (suspension)	Helliniko Olympic Indoor Arena; Referees: Lemme, Ullrich (GER)

=== Ninth place game ===
26 August 2004; 12:30	Greece	23–38	Angola	Helliniko Olympic Indoor Arena; Referees: Boye, Jensen (DEN)
26 August 2004; 12:30	Potari 6	(11–18)	Ilda 8	Helliniko Olympic Indoor Arena; Referees: Boye, Jensen (DEN)
26 August 2004; 12:30	3× (yellow card) 3× (suspension)		3× (yellow card) 2× (suspension)	Helliniko Olympic Indoor Arena; Referees: Boye, Jensen (DEN)

=== Seventh place game ===
29 August 2004; 08:30	China	25–26	Brazil	Helliniko Olympic Indoor Arena; Referees: Bretó, Huelin (ESP)
29 August 2004; 08:30	Li W. 7	(10–13)	A. Silva 6	Helliniko Olympic Indoor Arena; Referees: Bretó, Huelin (ESP)
29 August 2004; 08:30	4× (yellow card) 2× (suspension)		3× (yellow card) 3× (suspension)	Helliniko Olympic Indoor Arena; Referees: Bretó, Huelin (ESP)

=== Fifth place game ===
29 August 2004; 14:30	Spain	29–38	Hungary	Helliniko Olympic Indoor Arena; Referees: Boye, Jensen (DEN)
29 August 2004; 14:30	Puche 7	(15–22)	Radulović 10	Helliniko Olympic Indoor Arena; Referees: Boye, Jensen (DEN)
29 August 2004; 14:30	3× (yellow card) 3× (suspension)		3× (yellow card) 6× (suspension)	Helliniko Olympic Indoor Arena; Referees: Boye, Jensen (DEN)

=== Bronze medal game ===
28 August 2004; 16:30	Ukraine	21–18	France	Helliniko Olympic Indoor Arena; Referees: Požežnik, Repenšek (SLO)
28 August 2004; 16:30	Vergelyuk 6	(10–10)	Lejeune 7	Helliniko Olympic Indoor Arena; Referees: Požežnik, Repenšek (SLO)
28 August 2004; 16:30	4× (yellow card) 8× (suspension) 1× (red card)		3× (yellow card) 2× (suspension)	Helliniko Olympic Indoor Arena; Referees: Požežnik, Repenšek (SLO)

=== Gold medal game ===
29 August 2004
10:45
Denmark
38–36 (ET)
South Korea
Helliniko Indoor Arena
Referees: Baum, Góralczyk (POL)
Fruelund 15
(14–14)
Lee S 9
3× (yellow card) 1× (suspension)

4× (yellow card) 4× (suspension)

FT: 25–25 ET: 4–4, 5–5 Pen: 4–2

== Ranking and statistics ==
=== Final ranking ===
Rank	Team
1st place, gold medalist(s)	Denmark
2nd place, silver medalist(s)	South Korea
3rd place, bronze medalist(s)	Ukraine
4	France
5	Hungary
6	Spain
7	Brazil
8	China
9	Angola
10	Greece

=== All-Star Team ===
- Goalkeeper: Rikke Schmidt (DEN)
- Left wing: Line Daugaard (DEN)
- Left back: Katrine Fruelund (DEN)
- Pivot: Véronique Pecqueux-Rolland (FRA)
- Centre back: Lee Sang-eun (KOR)
- Right back: Maryna Vergelyuk (UKR)
- Right wing: Woo Sun-hee (KOR)

Source: IHF

=== Top goalscorers ===
Rank	Name	Team	Goals	Shots	%
1	Bojana Radulović	Hungary	54	96	56
2	Katrine Fruelund	Denmark	50	73	68
3	Lee Sang-eun	South Korea	44	60	73
4	Aline Silva	Brazil	40	70	57
5	Ilda Bengue	Angola	38	60	63
6	Woo Sun-hee	South Korea	37	50	74
7	Leila Lejeune	France	36	72	50
8	Nataliya Lyapina	Ukraine	35	46	76
9	Montserrat Puche	Spain	34	47	72
10	Li Weiwei	China	32	62	52
10	Chao Zhai	China	32	70	46

=== Top goalkeepers ===
Rank	Name	Team	%	Saves	Shots
1	Rikke Schmidt	Denmark	44	86	195
2	Nataliya Borysenko	Ukraine	43	59	136
3	Darly de Paula	Brazil	40	34	85
3	Katalin Palinger	Hungary	40	97	240
5	Odete Tavares	Angola	39	28	71
6	Karin Mortensen	Denmark	37	36	97
6	Eugenia Sánchez	Spain	37	64	172
8	Valerie Nicolas	France	36	57	157
9	Chana Masson	Brazil	35	76	217
9	Oh Yong-ran	South Korea	35	78	224
