= Kim Briggs =

Kim Briggs may refer to:

- Kim Briggs (Scrubs), a character from the TV series Scrubs
- Kim Briggs (handballer) (born 1977), Australian handball player
