= Laisa =

Laisa is a feminine given name. Notable people with the name include:

- Laisa Digitaki, Fijian businesswoman
- Laisa Lerus (born 1975), French handball player
- Laisa Vulakoro (born 1960), Fijian singer

== See also ==
- Raisa (given name)
