= Nodjialem Myaro =

French handball player (born 1976)

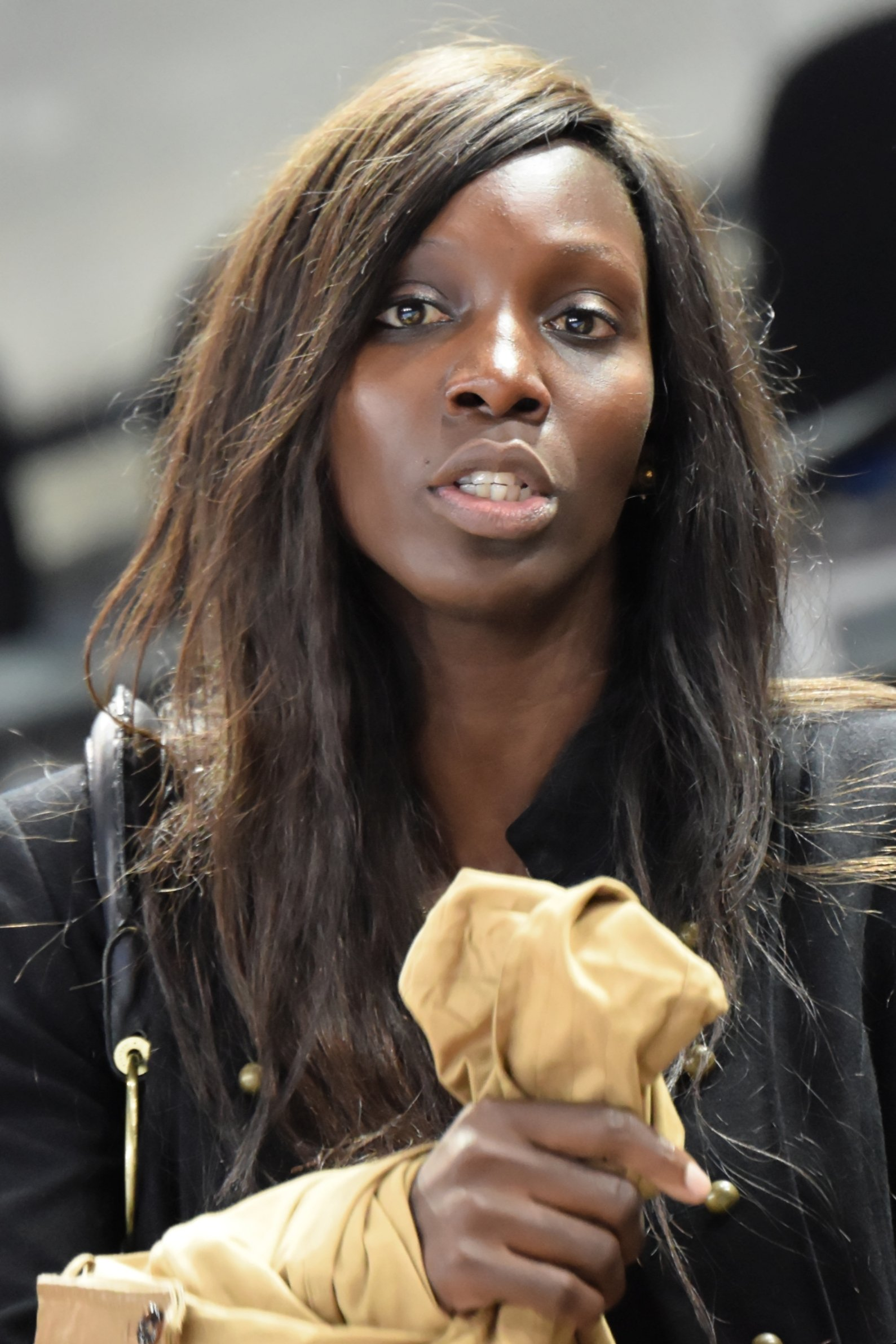
- Myaro in 2014

Personal information
- Nationality: French
- Born: 5 September 1976 (age 50) N'Djamena, Chad
- Height: 181 cm (71 in)

Sport
- Sport: Handball
- Position: Centre back

Senior clubs
- Years: Team
- 1991–1995: Toulouse Cheminot Marengo Sport
- 1995–2002: ASPTT Metz
- 2002–2003: Ikast-Bording Elite Håndbold
- 2003–2005: KIF Kolding
- 2005–2006: Le Havre AC Handball
- 2006–2007: Handball Plan-de-Cuques
- 2007–2009: HBC Saint Pierre à la Réunion
- 2010–2013: OGC Nice Côte d'Azur Handball
National team
Years	Team	Apps	(Gls)
1996-2013	France	151	(499)
Medal record
Women's handball
Representing France
World Championship
Gold medal – first place	2003 Croatia	Team
Silver medal – second place	1999 Denmark/Norway	Team
European Championship
Bronze medal – third place	2002 Denmark	Team
Mediterranean Games
Gold medal – first place	1997 Bari	Team
Gold medal – first place	2001 Tunis	Team

Nodjialem Myaro (born 5 September 1976 in N'Djamena, Chad) is a French handball player. She won silver at the 1999 World Championship and gold in 2003. She also competed at the 2000 and 2004 Summer Olympics.

She was included in the European Handball Federation Hall of Fame in 2023.

== Career ==
Myaro started playing handball in 1991 at Toulouse Cheminot Marengo Sport. In 1995 she joined ASPTT Metz. With Metz she won 5 times the French championship, 4 years in a row from 1996 to 2000 and again in 2002. She also won the 1998 and 1999 French Cup.

In the 2002-03 season she played for Danish club Ikast-Bording Elite Håndbold. Here she came second in both the Danish Cup and the Danish League. After a season she joined league rivals KIF Kolding. In 2005 she returned to France and joined Le Havre AC Handball, where she won the French Cup again. In 2006 she joined Handball Plan-de-Cuques. A year later she joined HBC Saint Pierre à la Réunion, where she played for two years. She then took a maternity leave, before joining OGC Nice Côte d'Azur Handball. Here she played for three years before retiring.

=== National team ===
Myaro made her debut for the French National Team on 4 October 1996 in a match against Austria. 1997 Mediterranean Games she won gold medals. Later the same year she represented France at the 1997 World Championship, where France finished 6th.

Two years later she played at the 1999 World Women's Handball Championship, where France won silver medals, losing to Norway, and Myaro was included in the tournament all star team.

At the 2000 European Women's Handball Championship she finished 5th with France.

In 2001 she won her second gold medal at the 2001 Mediterranean Games. The same year she and France finished 5th at the 2001 World Championship.

At the 2002 European Women's Handball Championship she won a bronze medal, losing to Norway in the semifinal and beating Russia in the third-place playoff.

The year after she won the 2003 World Women's Handball Championship with France. In the final against Hungary, France were down by 7 goals, but managed to take the game to extra time, where they won 32-29.

Her last tournament with France was the 2004 Olympics, where France lost the third place play-off to Ukraine.

== Post-playing career ==
Since 2013 she is the president of the Ligue Féminine de Handball, the governing body of women's professional handball in France. Since 2021 she is also a member of the Executive committee of the EHF as representative of Women's Handball Board.

She has also worked as a handball commentator on French TV.

== Private life ==
Born in Chad, Myaro moved to Toulouse at the age of two due to instability in Chad.
