= Elena Napăr =

Romanian handball player (born 1977)

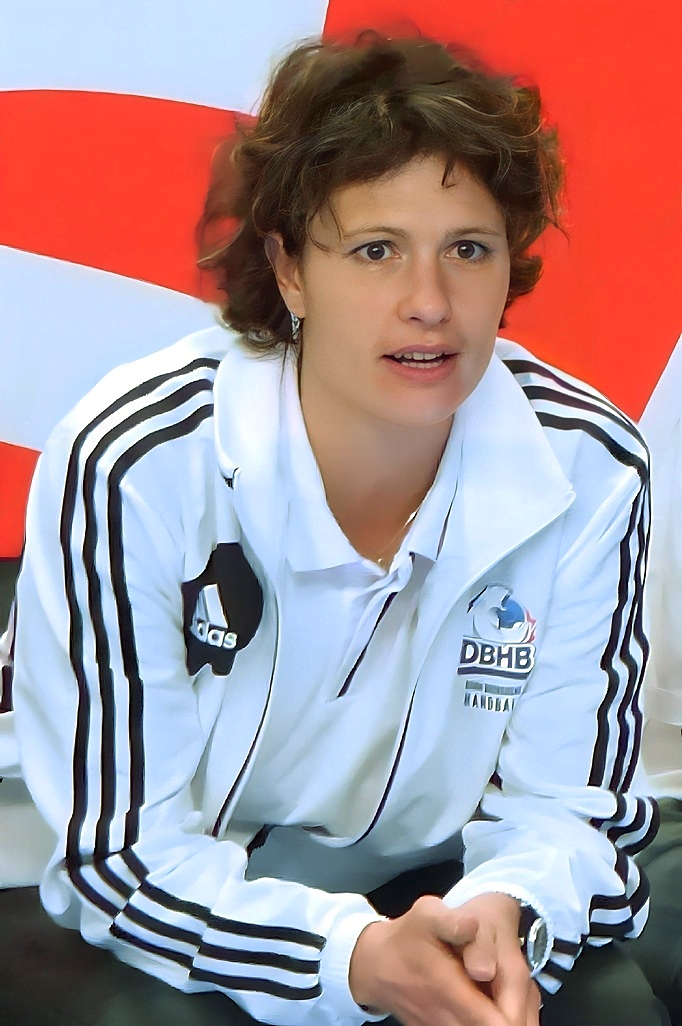
- Elena Napăr in 2014

Personal information
- Full name: Elena Roxana Napăr-Gropoşilă
- Nationality: Romanian
- Born: 25 January 1977 (age 49) Bucharest, Romania
- Height: 171 cm (67 in)

Sport
- Sport: Handball
- Position: Line player

Senior clubs
- Years: Team
- 1999-2001: Rapid București
- 2001-2007: Cercle Dijon Bourgogne Handball

Teams managed
- 2007-2012: Cercle Dijon Bourgogne Handball
- 2014: Dijon Métropole Handball

Elena Napăr (born 25 January 1977) is a Romanian handball player and coach. She competed in the women's tournament at the 2000 Summer Olympics.
