= Choi Hyeon-jeong =

South Korean handball player (born 1981)

Personal information
- Nationality: South Korean
- Born: 21 July 1981 (age 44)

Sport
- Sport: Handball

Choi Hyeon-jeong (born 21 July 1981) is a South Korean handball player. She competed in the women's tournament at the 2000 Summer Olympics.
