= Hanne Halén =

Norwegian handball player

Hanne Haléns
Personal information
- Nationality: Norwegian
- Born: 22 April 1979 (age 47)
- Height: 179 cm (70 in)

Sport
- Sport: Handball
- Position: Back
- Current club: retired

Senior clubs
- Years: Team
- –2002: Bækkelagets SK
- 2002–2004: Ferrobus Mislata
- 2005–2008: Ikast-Bording EH
- 2008–2009: Nordstrand IF
National team
Years	Team	Apps	(Gls)
2001–2004	Norway	13	(24)
Medal record
Representing Norway
Women's handball
World Championship
Silver medal – second place	2001 Italy	Team

Hanne Halén is a Norwegian former handball player. She played 13 matches for the Norway women's national handball team between 2001 and 2004. Halén won a silver medal with the Norwegian team at the 2001 World Women's Handball Championship in Italy.

She played for Bækkelagets SK and Nordstrand IF in Norway, Spanish Mislata, Danish Ikast-Bording Elite Håndbold . She retired in 2009. With Bækkelagets SK she won the 1998–99 EHF Women's Cup Winners' Cup and the Norwegian Championship in the same season. She also won the Norwegian title in 2001.

After her playing career she has needed surgeries due to injuries sustained during her playing years.
