= Sihem Aouini =

Tunisian team handball player

Sihem Aouini (born 9 June 1982) is a Tunisian handball player. She plays on the Tunisian national team, and participated at the 2011 World Women's Handball Championship in Brazil.
