= Svetlana Smirnova (handballer) =

Russian handball player

Personal information
- Full name: Svetlana Anatolievna Smirnova
- Nationality: Russian
- Born: 16 August 1977 (age 49) Leningradskaya, Soviet Union
- Height: 1.72 m (5 ft 8 in)

Sport
- Sport: Handball
- Position: Right back

Senior clubs
- Years: Team
- 1993–2013: HC Kuban Krasnodar
National team
- Years: Team
- 1993–2005: Russia
Medal record
World Championship
Gold medal – first place	Italy 2001	National Team

Svetlana Anatolievna Smirnova (Russian: Светлана Анатольевна Смирнова, born 16 August 1977) is a former Russian handball player, who won the World Championship in 2001.

== Career ==
Smirnova played her entire career for HC Kuban Krasnodar, where she is considered a club legend. She retired in 2013.

At the 1999 World Women's Handball Championship she was accused of doping with nandrolon, and was banned for 2 years until 4 December 2001. This meant that she was just ready to return for the 2001 World Women's Handball Championship in Italy. Here she won won gold medals with the Russian team.

She also represented Russia at the 1997 and 2003 World Women's Handball Championship.
