= Fiona Robinson =

Fiona Robinson may refer to:

- Fiona Robinson (sportswoman) (born 1969), Australian basketball and handball player
- Fiona Robinson (artist) (born 1949), British artist
