= Birgit Engl =

Austrian handball player (born 1979)

Personal information
- Nationality: Austrian
- Born: 4 March 1979 (age 47) Grieskirchen, Austria

Sport
- Sport: Handball

Senior clubs
- Years: Team
- –: (Austria) UHC Stockerau
- 1999-?: (Austria) Hypo Niederösterreich
- 2003-?: (Iceland) Vestmannaeyjar
- –: (Iceland) Stjarnan
National team
- Years: Team
- –: Austria
Medal record
World Championship
Bronze medal – third place	1999 Denmark & Norway

Birgit Engl (born 4 March 1979) is an Austrian handball player. She competed in the women's tournament at the 2000 Summer Olympics, where Austria finished 5th.

She also won bronze medal at the 1999 World Women's Handball Championship, which is the only World Championship medal Austria have ever won. (as of 2026)

She also represented Austria at the 2000, 2002 and 2004 European Championships and the 2001 and 2003 World Championships.
