= Ariane Maier =

Austrian handball player (born 1981)

Personal information
- Nationality: Austrian
- Born: 10 January 1981 (age 44) Bregenz, Austria

Sport
- Sport: Handball

Ariane Maier (born 10 Oktober 1981) is an Austrian handball player. She competed in the women's tournament at the 2000 Summer Olympics.
