= Chen Ji (handballer) =

Chinese handball player (born 1976)

Chen Ji (simplified Chinese: 陈积; traditional Chinese: 陳積; pinyin: Chén Jī; born December 5, 1976, in Shanghai) is a female Chinese handball player who competed at the 2004 Summer Olympics.

In 2004, she finished eighth with the Chinese team in the women's competition. She played six matches and scored nine goals.
