= Christelle Joseph-Mathieu =

French handball player (born 1975)

Personal information
- Nationality: French
- Born: 16 August 1975 (age 51) Paris, France
- Height: 176 cm (69 in)

Sport
- Sport: Handball
- Position: Right back

Senior clubs
- Years: Team
- –: Épinay/Seine
- -1996: USM Gagny
- 1996-1999: Stade français
- 1999-2003: Issy-les-Moulineaux Handball
- 2004-?: Issy-les-Moulineaux Handball
National team
- Years: Team
- –: France
Medal record
Women's handball
Representing France
World Championship
Silver medal – second place	1999 Denmark/Norway	Team

Christelle Joseph-Mathieu (born 16 August 1975) is a French handball player, who played as a right back.

She won a silver medal at the 1999 World Women's Handball Championship. She competed in the women's tournament at the 2000 Summer Olympics, where France finished 6th.

Her sister Stella Joseph-Mathieu is a goalkeeper.
