= Pernille Hansen =

Danish handball player (born 1976)

Personal information
- Full name: Pernille Stenkil Hansen
- Nationality: Danish
- Born: 5 January 1976 (age 50), Denmark

Sport
- Sport: Handball
- Position: Pivot

Senior clubs
- Years: Team
- 1997-1999: GOG Håndbold
- 1999: Horsens HK
- 1999-2001: GOG Håndbold
- 2001-2005: KIF Kolding
National team
Years	Team	Apps	(Gls)
1999-2001	Denmark	51	(70)

Pernille Stenkil Hansen (born 5 January 1976) is a Danish former handball player. She participated in the 1999 and 2001 World Championships and the 2000 European Championship.

She debuted for the Danish national team on 10 November 1999 against the Netherlands in a preparation match for the 1999 World Championship.

She was not selected for the Danish squad for the 2000 Olympics, as Karen Brødsgaard was preferred instead. Likewise, she was not initially not part of the Danish team for the 2000 European Championship later the same year. But due to Brødsgaard getting injured, she was included as her replacement.

In 2001 she joined KIF Kolding from GOG Håndbold, so she could study at University of Southern Denmark. She had at the time just finished her education at Skårup Seminarium to become a teacher, while playing for GOG.

She retired in 2005 due to a knee injury.

After her playing career she has worked as a consultant at University of Southern Denmark. She has since her playing days acted as a volunteer handball coach.
