= Mihaela Ignat =

Romanian handball player (born 1976)

Personal information
- Nationality: Romanian
- Born: 3 May 1976 (age 50) Constanța, Romania

Sport
- Sport: Handball
- Position: Centre back

Mihaela Ignat (born 3 May 1976) is a Romanian handball player. She competed in the women's tournament at the 2000 Summer Olympics.
