= Regina Camumbila =

Angolan handball player

Personal information
- Full name: Regina Edite Camumbila
- Nationality: Angolan
- Born: 6 July 1970 (age 56)

Sport
- Sport: Handball
National team
- Years: Team
- –: Angola

Regina Edite Camumbila (born 6 July 1970) is an Angolan handball player.

She competed at the 2000 Summer Olympics, where Angola placed 9th.
