= Viviani Emerick =

Brazilian handball player (born 1976)

Personal information
- Born: 9 September 1976 (age 49) Niterói, Brazil

Sport
- Sport: Handball

Viviani Emerick (born 9 September 1976) is a Brazilian handball player. She competed in the women's tournament at the 2000 Summer Olympics.
