= Haifa Abdelhak =

Tunisian handball player (born 1982)

Haifa Abdelhak (born October 31, 1982) is a Tunisian handball player. She plays on the Tunisian national team, and participated at the 2011 World Women's Handball Championship in Brazil.

At club level she played for Al Hilal sports de Tunis, Le Havre AC and Handball Octeville-sur-Mer.
