= Elena Tschauossova =

Russian handball player

Personal information
- Full name: Elena Petrovna Tschauossova
- Nationality: Russian
- Born: 26 June 1981 (age 45) Volgograd, Soviet Union

Sport
- Sport: Handball
- Position: Centre back

Senior clubs
- Years: Team
- -2002: Motor/AQVA Volgograd
National team
- Years: Team
- -2002: Russia
Medal record
World Championship
Gold medal – first place	Italy 2001	National Team

Elena Petrovna Tschauossova (Russian: Елена Чаусова, born 26 June 1981) is a Russian handball player, who won the World Championship in 2001.

== Club career ==
Tschauossova played volleyball as a youth player, and only switched to handball after meeting the coach Olgo Lebedeva. She then played for Motor Volgograd, which became AQVA Volgograd.

She retired already in 2002 at the age of 21 due to a desire to start a family. She said that her goal was to be a world Champion, and she had already achieved that.

== National team ==
She was part of the Russian U19 team who won silver medals at the 2000 U19 European Championship. In 2001 shw won gold medals at the U20 World Cup in Hungary, and was included in the tournament all star team. Later the same year, she was included in the Russian senior team, that won gold medals at the .2001 World Championship. She also represented Russia at the 2002 European Women's Handball Championship.
