= Gabriela Tănase =

Romanian handball player (born 1979)

Gabriela Đukanović
Personal information
- Full name: Gabriela Doina Đukanović
- Born: 6 March 1979 (age 47) Drobeta-Turnu Severin, Romania
- Height: 1.81 m (5 ft 11 in)

Sport
- Sport: Handball
- Position: Right back

Youth career
- Years: Team
- –: CSȘ Drobeta-Turnu Severin

Senior clubs
- Years: Team
- 1997–2001: Oltchim Râmnicu Vâlcea
- 2001–2002: Rapid București
- 2002–2004: Podravka Koprivnica
- 2004–2007: ŽRK Budućnost
National team
Years	Team	Apps	(Gls)
–	Romania	72	(158)

Gabriela Doina Đukanović (née Tănase; former Hobjila; born 6 March 1979) is a Romanian former handballer. She competed in the women's tournament at the 2000 Summer Olympics.

== International honours ==
- EHF Cup Winners' Cup:
  - Winner: 2006
- EHF Champions Trophy:
  - Third place: 2006
