= Alessandra Medeiros =

Brazilian handball player (born 1981)

Alessandra Medeiros de Oliviera (born 7 October 1981) is a Brazilian team handball player (line player). She plays on the Brazilian national team, and participated at the 2011 World Women's Handball Championship in Brazil. She also competed at the 2000 Summer Olympics and the 2008 Summer Olympics.
