= Margarida Conte =

Brazilian handball player (born 1966)

Personal information
- Born: 2 September 1966 (age 59) São Paulo, Brazil

Sport
- Sport: Handball

Margarida Conte (born 2 September 1966) is a Brazilian handball player. She competed in the women's tournament at the 2000 Summer Olympics.
