= Nataliya Borysenko =

Ukrainian handball player (born 1975)

Personal information
- Full name: Nataliya Borysenko
- Nationality: Ukrainian
- Born: December 3, 1975 (age 50) Zaporizhzhia, Ukrainian SSR, Soviet Union

Sport
- Sport: Handball
- Position: Goalkeeper
- Current club: Retired

Senior clubs
- Years: Team
- –2002: HC Motor Zaporizhzhia
- 2002–2007: Kometal Gjorče Petrov Skopje
National team
- Years: Team
- 1996–2005: Ukraine
Medal record
Representing Ukraine
Women's handball
Olympic Games
| Bronze medal – third place | 2004 Athens | Team |
European Championship
| Silver medal – second place | 2000 Romania | Team |

Nataliya Borysenko (Ukr.: Наталія Борисенко; born 3 December 1975) is a Ukrainian team handball player. She received a bronze medal with the Ukrainian national team at the 2004 Summer Olympics in Athens.
