= Aline Silva =

Brazilian handball player (born 1979)

Personal information
- Full name: Aline "Chicôria" da Conceicão da Silva
- Born: 25 May 1979 (age 47) Rio de Janeiro, Brazil
- Height: 176 cm (69 in)

Sport
- Sport: Handball
- Position: Left back
National team
- Years: Team
- –: Brazil

Aline "Chicôria" da Conceicão da Silva (born 25 July 1979) is a Brazilian handball player.

She was born in Rio de Janeiro, Brazil. She competed at the 2000 Summer Olympics, where Brazil placed 8th. She also competed at the 2004 Summer Olympics, where Brazil placed 7th.
