= Ana Razdorov-Lyø =

Dutch-Serbian handball player (born 1973)

Ana Razdorov-Lyø (born July 15, 1973, in Belgrade, Yugoslavia) is a Serbian born Dutch former handballplayer. She has played for both the Dutch and the Serbian national team. She has played 70 games for the Netherlands. Among the clubs, she has played for are the Danish clubs Odense HF, GOG, Kolding IF, SK Århus and Slagelse FH. In the Netherlands she played for VOC Amsterdam, Westfriesland-SEW and HV Swift Roermond. In 2010, she became lady's coach in SUS-Ullerslev. She is currently assistant coach for Team Esbjerg.

She is married with the Danish former volleyball player Peter Lyø. They have three children together.
