= Kim Briggs (handballer) =

Australian handball player

Personal information
- Born: 29 July 1977 (age 49) Sydney, New South Wales, Australia
- Height: 165 cm (65 in)

Sport
- Sport: Handball

Senior clubs
- Years: Team
- –: University of Sydney
National team
- Years: Team
- –: Australia
- Updated on only during the 2000 Summer Olympics

Kim Briggs (born 29 July 1977) is an Australian female handball player. She was a member of the Australia women's national handball team. She was part of the team at the 2000 Summer Olympics, playing two matches. The Australian team were beaten by Angola into tenth place.

After the Olympics Briggs continued her involvement with the Sydney University Handball Club, firstly as a player and later as a referee and coach. She also represented New South Wales in National Championships. In 2008 she was assistant coach to the Australian women's junior handball team, which competed at that year's World Championships in Belgrade. In 2017 she and Tessa Hayn jointly coached the New South Wales U18 and U21 teams to win their respective Australian Championships.
