= Vera Ignjatovic =

Australian haematologist and handball player

Vera Ignjatovic AM
- Born: 15 March 1975 (age 51); Niš, Nišava, Serbia
- Education: Monash University
- Scientific career
- Thesis: The effects of a phytochemical preparation on lipid metabolism in obesity: the study of 'Slimax', a Chinese herbal mixture (1999)

Vera Ignjatovic (born 15 March 1975) is an Australian medical researcher specialising in paediatric thrombosis and haemostasis and in proteomics. She is also a former handballer having represented Australia at the 2000 Olympics.

== Early life and education ==
Ignjatovic was born in Niš, Nišava, Serbia on 15 March 1975. She has a BSc (hons) and a PhD, for her thesis titled "The effects of a phytochemical preparation on lipid metabolism in obesity: the study of 'Slimax', a Chinese herbal mixture", from Monash University.

== Academic career ==
Ignjatovic was co-group leader of haematology research at the Murdoch Children's Research Institute and concurrently principal fellow, Department of Paediatrics at the University of Melbourne. Her research focus was on the effects of anticoagulants on children. She holds an honorary position in paediatrics at the Royal Children's Hospital in Melbourne.

As of August 2022, she moved to the United States to work at Johns Hopkins All Children's Institute for Clinical and Translational Research and was appointed professor of paediatrics at Johns Hopkins University. She was awarded the Order of Australia in 2025 for her service to paediatrics and proteomics, in promoting STEM to underrepresented groups, and in being a mentor.

== Sporting career ==
Ignjatovic was a member of the Australia women's national handball team at the 2000 Summer Olympics, playing in three group matches and in the final round. The Australian team were beaten by Angola into tenth place.
