= Valéria de Oliveira =

Brazilian handball player (born 1974)

Personal information
- Born: 2 July 1974 (age 51) Duque de Caxias, Brazil

Sport
- Sport: Handball

Valéria de Oliveira (born 2 July 1974) is a Brazilian former handball player. She competed in the women's tournament at the 2000 Summer Olympics.
