= Anja Nielsen =

Danish handball player (born 1975)

Personal information
- Nationality: Danish
- Born: 12 April 1975 (age 51) Kolding, Denmark
- Height: 168 cm (66 in)
- Weight: 63 kg (139 lb)

Sport
- Sport: Handball
- Position: Right wing

Youth career
- Years: Team
- 1993–1995: Kolding IF
- 1995–1999: Ikast-Bording

Senior clubs
- Years: Team
- 1999–2003: Ikast-Bording
- 2003–2004: IBV Vestmannaeyjar
- 2004–2005: Randers HK
National team
Years	Team	Apps	(Gls)
1999–2001	Denmark	45	(78)
Medal record
Women's handball
Representing Denmark
Olympic Games
Gold medal – first place	2000 Sydney	Team competition

Anja Nielsen (born 12 April 1975) is a Danish former team handball player and Olympic champion. She won a gold medal with the Danish national team at the 2000 Summer Olympics in Sydney.

She played for Ikast Bording EH for most of her senior career. She was expected to play at the 2001 World Cup in Italy, but missed out due to injury. This injury prompted her club, Ikast Bording, to not extend her contract as they were not sure, she could play for them in practice. She signed for Icelandic side IBV Vestmannaeyjar in 2003, where she stayed for a year before returning to Denmark to join Randers HK.
