= Laïsa Lerus =

French handball player (born 1975)

Personal information
- Born: August 7, 1975 (age 51) Les Abymes, Guadeloupe
- Height: 162 cm (64 in)

Sport
- Sport: Handball
- Position: Centre back
- Current club: Retired

Senior clubs
- Years: Team
- –1993: Guadeloupe UC
- 1993–1996: USM Gagny
- 1996–2000: Issy-les-Moulineaux Handball
- 2000–2002: HBC Nimes
- 2002–2004: Le Havre
National team
| Years | Team | Apps |
| –2001 | France | 37 |
Medal record
World Championship
| Silver medal – second place | 1999 Denmark/Norway | Team |

Laïsa Lerus (born 7 August 1975 in Les Abymes, Guadeloupe) is a French handball player who competed at the 2000 Summer Olympics. She also played at the 1999 World Women's Handball Championship, where she won a silver medal.
