= 2001 World Women's Handball Championship =

2001 edition of the World Women's Handball Championship

Tournament details
- Host country: Italy
- Venues: 4 (in 4 host cities)
- Dates: 4–16 December
- Teams: 24 (from 1 confederation)

Final positions
- Champions: Russia (1st title)
- Runners-up: Norway
- Third place: Yugoslavia
- Fourth place: Denmark

Tournament statistics
- Matches played: 80
- Goals scored: 4,154 (51.93 per match)
- Top scorer(s): (Austria) Ausra Fridrikas (87 goals)

The 2001 World Women's Handball Championship, the 15th of its kind, was held from 4 to 16 December 2001, and was hosted by Italy, with the final being played in Merano.

Russia won their first title, beating Norway in the final.

== Qualification ==
Competition	Dates	Host	Vacancies	Qualified
Host nation			1	Italy
1999 World Championship	29 November – 12 December 1999	Denmark; Norway	1	Norway
2000 African Championship	23 April – 1 May 2000	Algeria	3	Angola; Congo; Tunisia
2000 Asian Handball Championship	10–17 August 2000	(China) Shanghai	3	South Korea; Japan; China
2000 Pan American Championship	31 October – 5 November 2000	(Brazil) Aracaju	3	Brazil; Uruguay; Greenland
2000 European Championship	8–17 December 2000	Romania	5	Hungary; Ukraine; Russia; Romania; France
European qualification	25 November 2000 – 26 May 2001	Various	8	Austria; Denmark; Macedonia; Netherlands; Slovenia; Spain; Sweden; Yugoslavia

== Squads ==
Each team consists of up to 12 players for each match.

== Results ==
=== Preliminary round ===
==== Group A ====
Pos	Team	Pld	W	D	L	GF	GA	GD	Pts	Qualification
1	Denmark	5	5	0	0	141	98	+43	10	Round of 16
2	France	5	4	0	1	135	102	+33	8	Round of 16
3	China	5	3	0	2	130	142	−12	6	Round of 16
4	Netherlands	5	1	1	3	117	121	−4	3	Round of 16
5	Ukraine	5	0	2	3	120	145	−25	2	
6	Macedonia	5	0	1	4	110	145	−35	1	

4 December 2001; 16:30	Ukraine	28–28	Netherlands	Bolzano
4 December 2001; 16:30		(12–15)		Bolzano

4 December 2001; 18:30	France	31–17	Macedonia	Bolzano; Referees: Arnaldsson, Viðarsson (ISL)
4 December 2001; 18:30		(14–11)		Bolzano; Referees: Arnaldsson, Viðarsson (ISL)

4 December 2001; 20:30	Denmark	36–24	China	Bolzano; Attendance: 100; Referees: Pleşa, Pripas (ROU)
4 December 2001; 20:30	Kiærskou 8	(19–12)		Bolzano; Attendance: 100; Referees: Pleşa, Pripas (ROU)
4 December 2001; 20:30		Report (dk)		Bolzano; Attendance: 100; Referees: Pleşa, Pripas (ROU)

5 December 2001; 16:30	Netherlands	21–22	France	Bolzano; Referees: Forbord, Jørstad (NOR)
5 December 2001; 16:30		(10–8)		Bolzano; Referees: Forbord, Jørstad (NOR)

5 December 2001; 18:30	China	32–29	Ukraine	Bolzano; Referees: Bardella, Rubinetti (ITA)
5 December 2001; 18:30		(18–16)		Bolzano; Referees: Bardella, Rubinetti (ITA)

5 December 2001; 20:30	Macedonia	22–31	Denmark	Bolzano; Attendance: 500
5 December 2001; 20:30		(11–14)	Roslyng, Touray 6	Bolzano; Attendance: 500
5 December 2001; 20:30		Report (dk)		Bolzano; Attendance: 500

6 December 2001; 16:30	Netherlands	23–24	China	Bolzano
6 December 2001; 16:30		(7–13)		Bolzano

6 December 2001; 18:30	Ukraine	22–22	Macedonia	Bolzano
6 December 2001; 18:30		(10–12)		Bolzano

6 December 2001; 20:30	France	20–21	Denmark	Bolzano; Attendance: 800
6 December 2001; 20:30		(10–10)	Vestergaard 6	Bolzano; Attendance: 800
6 December 2001; 20:30		Report (dk)		Bolzano; Attendance: 800

8 December 2001; 16:30	Macedonia	24–29	Netherlands	Bolzano
8 December 2001; 16:30		(9–16)		Bolzano

8 December 2001; 18:30	France	29–18	China	Bolzano
8 December 2001; 18:30		(13–9)		Bolzano

8 December 2001; 20:30	Denmark	30–16	Ukraine	Bolzano; Attendance: 400
8 December 2001; 20:30	three players 6	(17–7)		Bolzano; Attendance: 400
8 December 2001; 20:30		Report (dk)		Bolzano; Attendance: 400

9 December 2001; 16:30	China	32–25	Macedonia	Bolzano
9 December 2001; 16:30		(15–15)		Bolzano

8 December 2001; 18:30	Ukraine	25–33	France	Bolzano
8 December 2001; 18:30		(13–17)		Bolzano

9 December 2001; 20:30	Denmark	23–16	Netherlands	Bolzano; Attendance: 400
9 December 2001; 20:30	Andersen 7	(10–7)		Bolzano; Attendance: 400
9 December 2001; 20:30		Report (dk)		Bolzano; Attendance: 400

==== Group B ====
Pos	Team	Pld	W	D	L	GF	GA	GD	Pts	Qualification
1	Sweden	5	5	0	0	135	116	+19	10	Round of 16
2	Hungary	5	4	0	1	142	117	+25	8	Round of 16
3	Spain	5	3	0	2	136	128	+8	6	Round of 16
4	Angola	5	2	0	3	126	116	+10	4	Round of 16
5	Romania	5	1	0	4	129	135	−6	2	
6	Congo	5	0	0	5	95	151	−56	0	

4 December 2001; 16:30	Hungary	24–23	Angola	Meranarena, Merano; Referees: Bord, Buy (FRA)
4 December 2001; 16:30		(12–12)		Meranarena, Merano; Referees: Bord, Buy (FRA)

4 December 2001; 18:30	Romania	25–29	Spain	Meranarena, Merano; Attendance: 150; Referees: Brunn, Nielsen (DEN)
4 December 2001; 18:30	Dobrin, Gâscă 6	(10–16)	Morskova 17	Meranarena, Merano; Attendance: 150; Referees: Brunn, Nielsen (DEN)
4 December 2001; 18:30	4× (yellow card) 4× (suspension) 1× (red card)	Report	3× (yellow card) 6× (suspension) 1× (red card)	Meranarena, Merano; Attendance: 150; Referees: Brunn, Nielsen (DEN)

4 December 2001; 20:30	Sweden	29–21	Congo	Meranarena, Merano
4 December 2001; 20:30		(13–9)		Meranarena, Merano

5 December 2001; 16:30	Angola	28–27	Romania	Meranarena, Merano; Referees: Gardinovački, Marić (FRY)
5 December 2001; 16:30		(15–12)		Meranarena, Merano; Referees: Gardinovački, Marić (FRY)

5 December 2001; 18:30	Congo	15–35	Hungary	Meranarena, Merano
5 December 2001; 18:30		(9–21)		Meranarena, Merano

5 December 2001; 20:30	Spain	24–27	Sweden	Meranarena, Merano; Referees: Dolejš, Kohout (CZE)
5 December 2001; 20:30	Morskova 12	(13–13)	Eriksson 7	Meranarena, Merano; Referees: Dolejš, Kohout (CZE)
5 December 2001; 20:30	3× (yellow card) 2× (suspension)	Report	3× (yellow card) 4× (suspension)	Meranarena, Merano; Referees: Dolejš, Kohout (CZE)

6 December 2001; 16:30	Angola	27–13	Congo	Meranarena, Merano
6 December 2001; 16:30		(15–6)		Meranarena, Merano

6 December 2001; 18:30	Romania	22–26	Sweden	Meranarena, Merano
6 December 2001; 18:30		(13–16)		Meranarena, Merano

6 December 2001; 20:30	Hungary	27–23	Spain	Meranarena, Merano; Attendance: 400; Referees: Khudoerko, Litvinov (RUS)
6 December 2001; 20:30	Balogh, Radulović 5	(11–14)	Morskova 12	Meranarena, Merano; Attendance: 400; Referees: Khudoerko, Litvinov (RUS)
6 December 2001; 20:30	3× (yellow card) 5× (suspension)	Report	2× (yellow card) 3× (suspension)	Meranarena, Merano; Attendance: 400; Referees: Khudoerko, Litvinov (RUS)

8 December 2001; 16:30	Sweden	30–29	Hungary	Meranarena, Merano
8 December 2001; 16:30		(15–17)		Meranarena, Merano

8 December 2001; 18:30	Romania	29–25	Congo	Meranarena, Merano
8 December 2001; 18:30		(15–17)		Meranarena, Merano

8 December 2001; 20:30	Spain	29–28	Angola	Meranarena, Merano; Referees: Arnaldsson, Viðarsson (ISL)
8 December 2001; 20:30	Morskova 10	(13–16)	Bengue 8	Meranarena, Merano; Referees: Arnaldsson, Viðarsson (ISL)
8 December 2001; 20:30	3× (yellow card) 3× (suspension)	Report	4× (yellow card) 3× (suspension)	Meranarena, Merano; Referees: Arnaldsson, Viðarsson (ISL)

9 December 2001; 16:30	Hungary	27–26	Romania	Meranarena, Merano
9 December 2001; 16:30		(12–15)		Meranarena, Merano

9 December 2001; 18:30	Congo	21–31	Spain	Meranarena, Merano; Referees: Gardinovački, Marić (FRY)
9 December 2001; 18:30	Ngayilolo 5	(9–18)	Morskova 7	Meranarena, Merano; Referees: Gardinovački, Marić (FRY)
9 December 2001; 18:30	3× (yellow card) 2× (suspension)	Report	3× (yellow card) 3× (suspension)	Meranarena, Merano; Referees: Gardinovački, Marić (FRY)

9 December 2001; 20:30	Sweden	23–20	Angola	Meranarena, Merano
9 December 2001; 20:30		(13–10)		Meranarena, Merano

==== Group C ====
Pos	Team	Pld	W	D	L	GF	GA	GD	Pts	Qualification
1	Russia	5	5	0	0	142	107	+35	10	Round of 16
2	Yugoslavia	5	3	1	1	168	122	+46	7 (Note: FR Yugoslavia 31–31 Austria)	Round of 16
3	Austria	5	3	1	1	146	129	+17	7	Round of 16
4	South Korea	5	2	0	3	146	133	+13	4	Round of 16
5	Japan	5	1	0	4	115	151	−36	2	
6	Greenland	5	0	0	5	77	152	−75	0	

Notes:

4 December 2001; 16:30	Russia	31–23	Japan	Meranarena, Merano; Referees: Bardella, Rubinetti (ITA)
4 December 2001; 16:30		(13–11)		Meranarena, Merano; Referees: Bardella, Rubinetti (ITA)

4 December 2001; 18:30	South Korea	29–31	Austria	Meranarena, Merano; Referees: Forbord, Jørstad (NOR)
4 December 2001; 18:30		(19–14)		Meranarena, Merano; Referees: Forbord, Jørstad (NOR)

4 December 2001; 20:30	Yugoslavia	35–13	Greenland	Palsport, Bressanone; Referees: Dittrich, Scharf (BRA)
4 December 2001; 20:30	Knežević 10	(19–5)	Jensen 5	Palsport, Bressanone; Referees: Dittrich, Scharf (BRA)
4 December 2001; 20:30		Report (sr)		Palsport, Bressanone; Referees: Dittrich, Scharf (BRA)

5 December 2001; 16:30	Austria	20–27	Russia	Meranarena, Merano; Referees: Fernández, Permuy (ESP)
5 December 2001; 16:30		(13–13)		Meranarena, Merano; Referees: Fernández, Permuy (ESP)

5 December 2001; 18:30	Japan	18–35	Yugoslavia	Meranarena, Merano; Referees: Bord, Buy (FRA)
5 December 2001; 18:30		(8–14)		Meranarena, Merano; Referees: Bord, Buy (FRA)

5 December 2001; 20:30	Greenland	12–27	South Korea	Palsport, Bressanone; Referees: Ehrmann, Künzig (GER)
5 December 2001; 20:30	Jensen, Kyed 3	(5–15)	Choi 8	Palsport, Bressanone; Referees: Ehrmann, Künzig (GER)
5 December 2001; 20:30		Report (dk)		Palsport, Bressanone; Referees: Ehrmann, Künzig (GER)

6 December 2001; 16:30	Japan	22–30	Austria	Meranarena, Merano
6 December 2001; 16:30		(9–13)		Meranarena, Merano

6 December 2001; 18:30	Yugoslavia	39–31	South Korea	Meranarena, Merano
6 December 2001; 18:30		(22–17)		Meranarena, Merano
6 December 2001; 18:30		Report (sr)		Meranarena, Merano

6 December 2001; 20:30	Russia	29–13	Greenland	Palsport, Bressanone; Referees: Besses, Benmila (ALG)
6 December 2001; 20:30	Tchaoussova 7	(14–4)	three players 3	Palsport, Bressanone; Referees: Besses, Benmila (ALG)

8 December 2001; 16:30	South Korea	23–26	Russia	Meranarena, Merano
8 December 2001; 16:30		(11–15)		Meranarena, Merano

8 December 2001; 18:30	Yugoslavia	31–31	Austria	Meranarena, Merano
8 December 2001; 18:30		(16–14)		Meranarena, Merano
8 December 2001; 18:30		Report (sr)		Meranarena, Merano

8 December 2001; 20:30	Greenland	19–27	Japan	Palsport, Bressanone; Referees: Dittrich, Scharf (BRA)
8 December 2001; 20:30	Kyed 7	(12–11)	Tanaka 8	Palsport, Bressanone; Referees: Dittrich, Scharf (BRA)

9 December 2001; 16:30	Russia	29–28	Yugoslavia	Meranarena, Merano; Attendance: 500; Referees: Bruun, Nielsen (DEN)
9 December 2001; 16:30	Poltoratskaya 11	(13–12)	Petrović 10	Meranarena, Merano; Attendance: 500; Referees: Bruun, Nielsen (DEN)
9 December 2001; 16:30	6× (suspension)	Report (sr)	7× (suspension)	Meranarena, Merano; Attendance: 500; Referees: Bruun, Nielsen (DEN)

9 December 2001; 18:30	South Korea	36–25	Japan	Meranarena, Merano
9 December 2001; 18:30		(16–13)		Meranarena, Merano

9 December 2001; 20:30	Austria	34–20	Greenland	Palsport, Bressanone; Referees: Fernández, Permuy (ESP)
9 December 2001; 20:30	Fridrikas, Ofenböck 8	(17–6)	Jensen 7	Palsport, Bressanone; Referees: Fernández, Permuy (ESP)

==== Group D ====
Pos	Team	Pld	W	D	L	GF	GA	GD	Pts	Qualification
1	Norway	5	5	0	0	175	91	+84	10	Round of 16
2	Slovenia	5	4	0	1	147	114	+33	8	Round of 16
3	Brazil	5	3	0	2	123	130	−7	6	Round of 16
4	Italy	5	2	0	3	109	122	−13	4	Round of 16
5	Tunisia	5	1	0	4	102	134	−32	2	
6	Uruguay	5	0	0	5	90	155	−65	0	

4 December 2001; 16:30	Slovenia	25-22	Tunisia
4 December 2001; 16:30		(14-10)

4 December 2001; 18:30	Norway	37–22	Brazil
4 December 2001; 18:30	Sandve (9)	(19–10)
4 December 2001; 18:30	4× (suspension)	Report (NOR)

4 December 2001; 20:30	Italy	26-22	Uruguay
4 December 2001; 20:30		(15-9)

5 Decembrie 2001; 16:30	Slovenia	36-23	Brazil
5 Decembrie 2001; 16:30		(16-10)

5 December 2001; 18:30	Uruguay	11–48	Norway
5 December 2001; 18:30		(4–21)	Sørlie Lybekk (10)
5 December 2001; 18:30		Report (NOR)	4× (suspension)

5 December 2001; 20:30	Italy	25-20	Tunisia
5 December 2001; 20:30		(12-11)

6 December 2001; 16:30	Brazil	23-18	Uruguay
6 December 2001; 16:30		(10-8)

6 December 2001; 18:30	Norway	30–18	Tunisia
6 December 2001; 18:30	Sandve (5)	(15–10)
6 December 2001; 18:30	5× (suspension)	Report (NOR)

6 December 2001; 20:30	Slovenia	28-21	Italy
6 December 2001; 20:30		(16-9)

8 December 2001; 16:30	Brazil	31-18	Tunisia
8 December 2001; 16:30		(20-8)

8 December 2001; 18:30	Slovenia	34-16	Uruguay
8 December 2001; 18:30		(15-7)

8 December 2001; 20:30	Italy	16–28	Norway
8 December 2001; 20:30		(6–15)	Rokne (6)
8 December 2001; 20:30		Report (NOR)	4× (suspension)

9 December 2001; 16:30	Tunisia	24-23	Uruguay
9 December 2001; 16:30		(11-9)

9 December 2001; 18:30	Norway	32–24	Slovenia
9 December 2001; 18:30	Grini (12)	(13–11)
9 December 2001; 18:30	4× (suspension)	Report (NOR)

9 December 2001; 20:30	Brazil	24-21	Italy
9 December 2001; 20:30		(13-12)

=== Knockout round ===
==== Bracket ====
Round of 16
11 December
Denmark	30
Angola	18
11 December
Austria	26
Slovenia	21
11 December
Russia	24
Italy	19
11 December
China	23
Hungary	24
11 December
Spain	25
France	32
11 December
Norway	29
South Korea	25
11 December
Brazil	22
Yugoslavia	38
11 December
Sweden	23
Netherlands	21

Quarterfinals
13 December
Denmark	27
Austria	26
13 December
Russia	30
Hungary	23
13 December
France	26
Norway	29
13 December
Yugoslavia	32
Sweden	18

Semifinals
15 December
Denmark	20
Russia	26
15 December
Norway (ET)	34
Yugoslavia	33

Final
16 December
Russia	30
Norway	25
Third place
16 December
Denmark	40
Yugoslavia (ET)	42

5–8th place semifinals
15 December
Austria	33
Hungary	36
15 December
France	22
Sweden	21

Fifth place
16 December
Hungary	30
France	31
Seventh place
16 December
Austria	33
Sweden	31

==== Round of 16 ====
11 December 2001; 18:00	Spain	25–32	France	Palasport, Bressanone; Referees: Bruun, Nielsen (DEN)
11 December 2001; 18:00	Morskova 9	(13–17)	Lejeune 14	Palasport, Bressanone; Referees: Bruun, Nielsen (DEN)
11 December 2001; 18:00	4× (yellow card) 3× (suspension)	Report	3× (yellow card) 10× (suspension) 1× (red card)	Palasport, Bressanone; Referees: Bruun, Nielsen (DEN)

11 December 2001; 18:00	Brazil	22–38	Yugoslavia	Meranarena, Merano; Referees: Kang, Lim (KOR)
11 December 2001; 18:00	Sales 8	(9–22)	Savić 10	Meranarena, Merano; Referees: Kang, Lim (KOR)
11 December 2001; 18:00	2× (yellow card) 1× (suspension)	Report	3× (yellow card) 5× (suspension)	Meranarena, Merano; Referees: Kang, Lim (KOR)

11 December 2001; 18:00	China	23–24	Hungary	PalaTrento, Trento; Referees: Arnaldsson, Viðarsson (ISL)
11 December 2001; 18:00	Zhai 7	(13–11)	Ag. Farkas 6	PalaTrento, Trento; Referees: Arnaldsson, Viðarsson (ISL)
11 December 2001; 18:00	3× (yellow card) 4× (suspension)	Report	3× (yellow card) 4× (suspension)	PalaTrento, Trento; Referees: Arnaldsson, Viðarsson (ISL)

11 December 2001; 18:00	Austria	26–21	Slovenia	Palasport, Bolzano; Referees: Forbord, Jørstad (NOR)
11 December 2001; 18:00	Fridrikas 9	(14–13)	Mijatović 6	Palasport, Bolzano; Referees: Forbord, Jørstad (NOR)
11 December 2001; 18:00	4× (yellow card) 4× (suspension) 1× (red card)	Report	2× (yellow card) 3× (suspension)	Palasport, Bolzano; Referees: Forbord, Jørstad (NOR)

11 December 2001; 20:30	Denmark	30–18	Angola	Palasport, Bolzano; Attendance: 200; Referees: Pleşa, Pripas (ROU)
11 December 2001; 20:30	Touray 7	(16–8)	Bengue 5	Palasport, Bolzano; Attendance: 200; Referees: Pleşa, Pripas (ROU)
11 December 2001; 20:30	3× (yellow card) 4× (suspension)	Report	2× (yellow card) 4× (suspension) 1× (red card)	Palasport, Bolzano; Attendance: 200; Referees: Pleşa, Pripas (ROU)

11 December 2001; 20:30	Russia	24–19	Italy	PalaTrento, Trento; Referees: Alonso, Tchara (ARG)
11 December 2001; 20:30	Bodnieva 5	(10–10)	Anysenkova 7	PalaTrento, Trento; Referees: Alonso, Tchara (ARG)
11 December 2001; 20:30	2× (yellow card) 6× (suspension) 1× (red card)	Report	3× (yellow card) 6× (suspension)	PalaTrento, Trento; Referees: Alonso, Tchara (ARG)

11 December 2001; 20:30	Sweden	23–21	Netherlands	Meranarena, Merano; Referees: Baum, Góralczyk (POL)
11 December 2001; 20:30	Erkisson 7	(10–10)	Pusic 8	Meranarena, Merano; Referees: Baum, Góralczyk (POL)
11 December 2001; 20:30	3× (yellow card) 2× (suspension)	Report	3× (yellow card) 2× (suspension)	Meranarena, Merano; Referees: Baum, Góralczyk (POL)

11 December 2001; 20:30	Norway	29–25	South Korea	Palasport, Bressanone; Referees: Khudoerko, Litvinov (RUS)
11 December 2001; 20:30	Grini, Rokne 7	(16–14)	Choi, Moon 6	Palasport, Bressanone; Referees: Khudoerko, Litvinov (RUS)
11 December 2001; 20:30	3× (yellow card) 3× (suspension)	Report	2× (yellow card) 5× (suspension) 1× (red card)	Palasport, Bressanone; Referees: Khudoerko, Litvinov (RUS)

==== Quarterfinals ====
13 December 2001; 20:30	Denmark	27–26	Austria	Palsport, Bressanone; Attendance: 1,200; Referees: Bord, Buy (FRA)
13 December 2001; 20:30	Kiærskou 6	(15–15)	Fridrikas 14	Palsport, Bressanone; Attendance: 1,200; Referees: Bord, Buy (FRA)
13 December 2001; 20:30	3× (yellow card) 5× (suspension)	Report	4× (yellow card) 5× (suspension)	Palsport, Bressanone; Attendance: 1,200; Referees: Bord, Buy (FRA)

13 December 2001; 19:43	Russia	30–23	Hungary	Meranarena, Merano; Referees: Forbord, Jørstad (NOR)
13 December 2001; 19:43	Kareeva 8	(15–10)	Borók 7	Meranarena, Merano; Referees: Forbord, Jørstad (NOR)
13 December 2001; 19:43	2× (yellow card) 6× (suspension)	Report	2× (yellow card) 7× (suspension) 1× (red card)	Meranarena, Merano; Referees: Forbord, Jørstad (NOR)

13 December 2001; 20:30	France	26–29	Norway	Palasport, Bolzano
13 December 2001; 20:30		(11–15)	Rokne 7	Palasport, Bolzano
13 December 2001; 20:30		Report (no)	5× (suspension)	Palasport, Bolzano

13 December 2001; 20:30	Yugoslavia	32–18	Sweden	PalaTrento, Trento; Referees: Ehrmann, Künzig (GER)
13 December 2001; 20:30	Kolaković, Savić 6	(13–9)	Erkisson 5	PalaTrento, Trento; Referees: Ehrmann, Künzig (GER)
13 December 2001; 20:30	4× (yellow card) 6× (suspension)	Report	3× (yellow card) 10× (suspension) 1× (red card)	PalaTrento, Trento; Referees: Ehrmann, Künzig (GER)

==== 5–8th place semifinals ====
15 December 2001; 18:00	Austria	33–36	Hungary	PalaTrento, Trento; Referees: Khudoerko, Litvinov (RUS)
15 December 2001; 18:00	Fridrikas 10	(19–16)	Ag. Farkas 7	PalaTrento, Trento; Referees: Khudoerko, Litvinov (RUS)
15 December 2001; 18:00	3× (yellow card) 4× (suspension)	Report	4× (yellow card) 8× (suspension)	PalaTrento, Trento; Referees: Khudoerko, Litvinov (RUS)

15 December 2001; 18:00	France	22–21	Sweden	Palasport, Bolzano; Referees: Arnaldsson, Viðarsson (ISL)
15 December 2001; 18:00	Lejeune 8	(10–9)	Erkisson 7	Palasport, Bolzano; Referees: Arnaldsson, Viðarsson (ISL)
15 December 2001; 18:00	3× (yellow card) 5× (suspension)	Report	3× (yellow card) 2× (suspension)	Palasport, Bolzano; Referees: Arnaldsson, Viðarsson (ISL)

==== Semifinals ====
15 December 2001; 20:30	Denmark	20–26	Russia	PalaTrento, Trento; Referees: Baum, Góralczyk (POL)
15 December 2001; 20:30	Vestergaard 5	(12–11)	Tschauossova 10	PalaTrento, Trento; Referees: Baum, Góralczyk (POL)
15 December 2001; 20:30	3× (yellow card) 3× (suspension)	Report	3× (yellow card) 3× (suspension)	PalaTrento, Trento; Referees: Baum, Góralczyk (POL)

15 December 2001
20:30
Norway
34–33 (ET)
Yugoslavia
Palasport, Bolzano
Referees: Bord, Buy (FRA)
Grini 11
(15–16)
Knežević 8
3× (yellow card) 6× (suspension)
Report
3× (yellow card) 9× (suspension)

FT: 29–29 ET: 5–4

==== Seventh place game ====
16 December 2001; 10:00	Austria	33–31	Sweden	Meranarena, Merano; Referees: Pleşa, Pripas (ROU)
16 December 2001; 10:00	Strass 10	(20–13)	Erkisson 6	Meranarena, Merano; Referees: Pleşa, Pripas (ROU)
16 December 2001; 10:00	3× (yellow card) 2× (suspension)	Report	3× (yellow card) 4× (suspension)	Meranarena, Merano; Referees: Pleşa, Pripas (ROU)

==== Fifth place game ====
16 December 2001; 12:30	Hungary	30–31	France	Meranarena, Merano; Referees: Forbord, Jørstad (NOR)
16 December 2001; 12:30	Balogh 9	(16–14)	Wendling 7	Meranarena, Merano; Referees: Forbord, Jørstad (NOR)
16 December 2001; 12:30	3× (yellow card) 5× (suspension)	Report	2× (yellow card) 6× (suspension) 1× (red card)	Meranarena, Merano; Referees: Forbord, Jørstad (NOR)

==== Third place game ====
16 December 2001
15:00
Denmark
40–42 (ET)
Yugoslavia
Meranarena, Merano
Attendance: 3,500
Referees: Ehrmann, Künzig (GER)
Vestergaard 16
(17–14)
Kolaković 7
4× (yellow card) 2× (suspension)
Report
4× (yellow card) 5× (suspension)

FT: 34–34 ET: 6–8

==== Final ====
16 December 2001; 17:30	Russia	30–25	Norway	Meranarena, Merano; Referees: Dolejš, Kohout (CZE)
16 December 2001; 17:30	Bodniyeva, Poltoratskaya 5	(18–12)	Grini 9	Meranarena, Merano; Referees: Dolejš, Kohout (CZE)
16 December 2001; 17:30	3× (yellow card) 4× (suspension)	Report	3× (yellow card) 2× (suspension)	Meranarena, Merano; Referees: Dolejš, Kohout (CZE)

== Final standings ==
Rank	Team
1st place, gold medalist(s)	Russia
2nd place, silver medalist(s)	Norway
3rd place, bronze medalist(s)	Yugoslavia
4	Denmark
5	France
6	Hungary
7	Austria
8	Sweden
9	Slovenia
10	Spain
11	China
12	Brazil
13	Angola
14	Netherlands
15	South Korea
16	Italy
17	Romania
18	Ukraine
19	Tunisia
20	Japan
21	Macedonia
22	Congo
23	Uruguay
24	Greenland

== Statistics ==
=== Top goalscorers ===
Rank	Name	Goals	Shots	%
1	(Austria) Ausra Fridrikas	87	157	55.4
2	(France) Leila Lejeune	71	122	58.2
3	(Spain) Natalia Morskova	67	98	68.4
4	(Norway) Kjersti Grini	53	85	62.4
5	(Sweden) Åsa Eriksson	50	86	58.1
6	(Federal Republic of Yugoslavia) Maja Savić	49	71	69.0
6	(China) Zhai Chao	49	88	55.7
8	(Russia) Elena Tchaoussova	47	72	65.3
8	(Federal Republic of Yugoslavia) Bojana Petrović	47	84	56.0
10	(Austria) Barbara Strass	45	66	68.2
10	(Federal Republic of Yugoslavia) Sandra Kolaković	45	69	65.2

Source: IHF

=== Top goalkeepers ===
Rank	Name	Saves	Shots	%
1	(Norway) Cecilie Leganger	128	297	43.1
2	(Sweden) Jenny Lindblom	119	301	39.5
3	(France) Valérie Nicolas	86	252	34.1
4	(Federal Republic of Yugoslavia) Zlata Paplacko	84	241	34.9
5	(Austria) Nataliya Rusnachenko	83	224	37.1
6	(Denmark) Lene Rantala	72	195	36.9
7	(Russia) Svetlana Bogdanova	71	165	43.0
8	(Slovenia) Nada Tutnijc	66	159	41.5
8	(Brazil) Chana Masson	66	197	33.5
10	(Italy) Verena Wolf	63	201	31.3

Source: IHF

=== All Star team ===
Goalkeeper	(Norway)	Cecilie Leganger
Right wing	(Hungary)	Beatrix Balogh
Right back	(Denmark)	Mette Vestergaard
Line player	(Russia)	Liudmila Bodnieva
Central back	(Russia)	Irina Poltoratskaya
Left back	(France)	Leila Lejeune
Left wing	(Socialist Federal Republic of Yugoslavia)	Maja Savić

== Medalists ==
Gold	Silver	Bronze
Russia	Norway	Yugoslavia
