= Lee Sang-eun =

South Korean handball player (born 1975)

Personal information
- Full name: Lee Sang-eun
- Nationality: South Korean
- Born: 5 March 1975 (age 51) Imsil, South Korea
- Height: 1.72 m (5 ft 8 in)

Sport
- Sport: Handball
- Position: Centre back

Senior clubs
- Years: Team
- 2002–2002: Slagelse DT
- 2002–2003: Team Tvis Holstebro
- 2005–2008: SD Itxako
National team
- Years: Team
- –: South Korea
Medal record
Olympic Games
Silver medal – second place	1996 Atlanta	Team
Silver medal – second place	2004 Athens	Team
World Championship
Gold medal – first place	1995 Austria/Hungary
Asian Games
Gold medal – first place	1994 Hiroshima	Team
Gold medal – first place	1998 Bangkok	Team
- Korean name
- Hangul: 이상은
- Hanja: 李尙恩
- RR: I Sangeun
- MR: I Sangŭn

Lee Sang-Eun (born March 5, 1975) is a former South Korean handball player who competed in the 1996, 2000, and 2004 Summer Olympics.

In 1996 she was part of the South Korean team which won the silver medal. She played five matches and scored 14 goals.

Four years later she was part of the South Korean team which finished fourth in the 2000 Olympic tournament. She played all seven matches and scored 59 goals.

In 2004, she won the silver medal with the South Korean team again. She played all seven matches and scored 44 goals. South Korea lost to Denmark in the final on a penalty shoot out.

In 1995 she was part of the South Korea team that won the 1995 World Championship.
