= Maja Grønbæk =

Danish handball player (born 1971)

Personal information
- Full name: Maja Corinna Grønbek
- Nationality: Danish
- Born: 30 January 1971 (age 55) Amager, Denmark
- Height: 1.80 m (5 ft 11 in)

Sport
- Sport: Handball
- Position: Left Back

Youth career
- Years: Team
- –: MK 31

Senior clubs
- Years: Team
- –1992: Virum-Sorgenfri HK
- 1992–2001: IK Skovbakken
- 2001–2005: SK Århus
- 2005–2006: FH Handbolti (Iceland)
National team
Years	Team	Apps	(Gls)
1999–2000	Denmark	22	(56)
Medal record
Women's handball
Representing Denmark
Olympic Games
Gold medal – first place	2000 Sydney	Team competition

Maja Grønbæk (born 30 January 1971) is a Danish former team handball player and Olympic champion.

== National team ==
She won a gold medal with the Danish national team at the 2000 Summer Olympics in Sydney after making her debut in 1999. She was however only a back-up for most of the matches. She ended up playing 22 matches for the Danish National team.

== Career ==
Grønbæk started playing handball at MK 31 aged, and later joined Virum-Sorgenfri HK. She joined IK Skovbakken in 1992. From 2001 to 2005 she played for SK Aarhus. Grønbæk initially retired in march 2005, but later the same year she came back to professional handball, signing for the Spanish club Cementos. However after only a week at the club, head coach Gregorio Garcia announced that she could not expect playing time. This prompted her to leave the club without even playing a single match. She instead signed a two-month contract with the Icelandic club FH Handbolti.

Today she works as physiotherapist.
