= Nathalie Selambarom =

French handball player (born 1971)

Personal information
- Born: 3 February 1971 (age 55) Saint-Louis, Réunion, France
- Height: 163 cm (64 in)

Sport
- Sport: Handball
- Position: Right back, Right wing

Senior clubs
- Years: Team
- 1994-2004: Metz Handball
- 2004-2007: ESC Yutz
- –: HB Dudelange
National team
Years	Team	Apps	(Gls)
1997-?	France	115	(138)
Medal record
Women's handball
Representing France
World Championship
Silver medal – second place	1999 Denmark/Norway	Team
Mediterranean Games
Gold medal – first place	1997 Bari	Team
Gold medal – first place	2001 Tunis	Team

Nathalie Selambarom (born 3 February 1971) is a French female handball player. She was a member of the France women's national handball team. She was part of the team at the 2000 Summer Olympics, playing seven matches. On club level she played for Metz Handball, where she won the French championship in 1995, 1996, 1997, 1999, 2000, 2002 and 2004 and the French cup in 1998 and 1999. She also played for ESC Yutz and Luxembourgish HB Dudelange.
