= Sandra de Oliveira =

Brazilian handball player (born 1973)

Personal information
- Born: 19 September 1973 (age 52) Rio de Janeiro, Brazil

Sport
- Sport: Handball

Sandra de Oliveira (born 19 September 1973) is a Brazilian handball player. She competed in the women's tournament at the 2000 Summer Olympics.
