= Maria José Batista de Sales =

Brazilian handball player (born 1969)

Personal information
- Nickname: Zezé
- Born: 19 March 1969 (age 56) São Gonçalo, Brazil

Sport
- Sport: Handball

Maria José Batista de Sales (born 19 March 1969), also known as Zezé, is a Brazilian former handball player. She competed in the women's tournament at the 2000 Summer Olympics.
