= Handball at the 2000 Summer Olympics – Women's tournament =

2000 Women's Olympic handball tournament
Tournament details
- Host country: Australia
- Venues: 2 (in 1 host city)
- Dates: 17 September – 1 October 2000
- Teams: 10 (from 5 confederations)

Final positions
- Champions: Denmark (2nd title)
- Runners-up: Hungary
- Third place: Norway
- Fourth place: South Korea

Tournament statistics
- Matches played: 33
- Goals scored: 1,763 (53.42 per match)
- Top scorer: (Norway) Kjersti Grini (61 goals)

The women's handball competition, one of two events of handball at the 2000 Summer Olympics, in Sydney, took place at The Dome (Sydney Olympic Park) during the preliminary round, quarter-finals, semi-finals and medal matches. A total of 150 players, distributed among ten national teams, participated in this tournament.

== Medalists ==
| Gold | Silver | Bronze |
|---|---|---|
| Denmark Lene Rantala; Camilla Andersen; Tina Bøttzau; Janne Kolling; Tonje Kjærgaard; Karen Brødsgaard; Katrine Fruelund; Maja Grønbæk; Christina Hansen; Anette Hoffmann; Lotte Kiærskou; Karin Mortensen; Anja Nielsen; Rikke Petersen; Mette Vestergaard | Hungary Beatrix Balogh; Rita Deli; Ágnes Farkas; Andrea Farkas; Anikó Kántor; Beatrix Kökény; Anita Kulcsár; Dóra Lőwy; Anikó Nagy; Ildikó Pádár; Katalin Pálinger; Krisztina Pigniczki; Bojana Radulovics; Judith Simics; Beáta Siti | Norway Kristine Duvholt; Trine Haltvik; Heidi Tjugum; Susann Goksør Bjerkrheim; Ann Cathrin Eriksen; Kjersti Grini; Elisabeth Hilmo; Mia Hundvin; Tonje Larsen; Cecilie Leganger; Jeanette Nilsen; Marianne Rokne; Birgitte Sættem; Monica Sandve; Else-Marthe Sørlie |

== Qualification ==
| Mean of qualification | Date | Host | Vacancies | Qualified |
|---|---|---|---|---|
| Host nation | 24 September 1993 | (Monaco) Monte Carlo | 1 | Australia |
| 1998 European Championship | 21–30 January 2000 | Netherlands | 1 | Denmark |
| 1999 Pan American Games | 31 July – 7 August 1999 | (Canada) Winnipeg | 1 | Brazil |
| African qualification tournament | 15–18 October 1999 | (Benin) Cotonou | 1 | Angola |
| 1999 World Championship | 29 November – 12 December 1999 | Denmark; Norway | 5 | Norway; France; Austria; Romania; Hungary |
| 1999 Asian Championship | 24–29 January 2000 | (Japan) Kumamoto | 1 | South Korea |
| Total | | | 10 | |

== Preliminary round ==
For the preliminary round, the ten teams were distributed into two groups of five teams. Each team played against each of its four group opponents for a total of four matches. The four best-scoring teams advanced to the quarter-finals.

=== Group A ===
| Pos | Team | Pld | W | D | L | GF | GA | GD | Pts | Qualification |
|---|---|---|---|---|---|---|---|---|---|---|
| 1 | South Korea | 4 | 4 | 0 | 0 | 131 | 100 | +31 | 8 | Quarterfinals |
| 2 | Hungary | 4 | 2 | 1 | 1 | 119 | 106 | +13 | 5 | Quarterfinals |
| 3 | France | 4 | 2 | 0 | 2 | 90 | 93 | −3 | 4 | Quarterfinals |
| 4 | Romania | 4 | 1 | 1 | 2 | 99 | 101 | −2 | 3 | Quarterfinals |
| 5 | Angola | 4 | 0 | 0 | 4 | 98 | 137 | −39 | 0 | Ninth place game |

| 17 September 2000; 14:30 | Hungary | 42–22 | Angola | Pavilion 2, Sydney; Referees: Tomaszewski, Adams (AUS) |
| 17 September 2000; 14:30 | Radulović 11 | (18–13) | Bengue 8 | Pavilion 2, Sydney; Referees: Tomaszewski, Adams (AUS) |
| 17 September 2000; 14:30 | 2× (yellow card) 2× (suspension) | | 3× (yellow card) 8× (suspension) | Pavilion 2, Sydney; Referees: Tomaszewski, Adams (AUS) |

| 17 September 2000; 21:30 | South Korea | 25–18 | France | Pavilion 2, Sydney; Referees: Boye, Jensen (DEN) |
| 17 September 2000; 21:30 | Lee S. 10 | (15–3) | Lejeune 7 | Pavilion 2, Sydney; Referees: Boye, Jensen (DEN) |
| 17 September 2000; 21:30 | 3× (yellow card) 3× (suspension) | | 3× (yellow card) 3× (suspension) | Pavilion 2, Sydney; Referees: Boye, Jensen (DEN) |

| 19 September 2000; 16:30 | France | 22–23 | Hungary | Pavilion 2, Sydney; Referees: Hansson, Olsson (SWE) |
| 19 September 2000; 16:30 | Pecqueux-Rolland 6 | (14–12) | Radulović 9 | Pavilion 2, Sydney; Referees: Hansson, Olsson (SWE) |
| 19 September 2000; 16:30 | 3× (yellow card) 3× (suspension) | | 2× (yellow card) 4× (suspension) | Pavilion 2, Sydney; Referees: Hansson, Olsson (SWE) |

| 19 September 2000; 19:30 | Romania | 25–34 | South Korea | Pavilion 2, Sydney; Referees: Litvinov, Khudoerko (RUS) |
| 19 September 2000; 19:30 | Dobrin, Luca 5 | (9–16) | Lee S., Oh S. 8 | Pavilion 2, Sydney; Referees: Litvinov, Khudoerko (RUS) |
| 19 September 2000; 19:30 | 3× (yellow card) 2× (suspension) | | 2× (yellow card) 2× (suspension) | Pavilion 2, Sydney; Referees: Litvinov, Khudoerko (RUS) |

| 21 September 2000; 16:30 | Angola | 25–35 | Romania | Pavilion 2, Sydney; Referees: Bojsen, Anusic (USA) |
| 21 September 2000; 16:30 | Bengue 11 | (11–16) | Dobrin 10 | Pavilion 2, Sydney; Referees: Bojsen, Anusic (USA) |
| 21 September 2000; 16:30 | 2× (yellow card) 6× (suspension) | | 3× (yellow card) 10× (suspension) 1× (red card) | Pavilion 2, Sydney; Referees: Bojsen, Anusic (USA) |

| 21 September 2000; 21:30 | Hungary | 33–41 | South Korea | Pavilion 2, Sydney; Referees: Nachevski, Nachevski (MKD) |
| 21 September 2000; 21:30 | Balogh 8 | (19–16) | Lee S. 18 | Pavilion 2, Sydney; Referees: Nachevski, Nachevski (MKD) |
| 21 September 2000; 21:30 | 3× (yellow card) 6× (suspension) | | 4× (yellow card) 1× (suspension) | Pavilion 2, Sydney; Referees: Nachevski, Nachevski (MKD) |

| 23 September 2000; 14:30 | Angola | 27–29 | France | Pavilion 2, Sydney; Referees: Marić, Gardinovački (FRY) |
| 23 September 2000; 14:30 | Bengue 7 | (11–16) | Pecqueux-Rolland 7 | Pavilion 2, Sydney; Referees: Marić, Gardinovački (FRY) |
| 23 September 2000; 14:30 | 3× (yellow card) 6× (suspension) | | 3× (yellow card) 4× (suspension) 1× (red card) | Pavilion 2, Sydney; Referees: Marić, Gardinovački (FRY) |

| 23 September 2000; 21:30 | Romania | 21–21 | Hungary | Pavilion 2, Sydney; Referees: Øie, Høgsnes (NOR) |
| 23 September 2000; 21:30 | Drăgănescu 7 | (12–10) | Ág. Farkas 6 | Pavilion 2, Sydney; Referees: Øie, Høgsnes (NOR) |
| 23 September 2000; 21:30 | 3× (yellow card) 5× (suspension) | | 3× (yellow card) 3× (suspension) 1× (red card) | Pavilion 2, Sydney; Referees: Øie, Høgsnes (NOR) |

| 25 September 2000; 16:30 | South Korea | 31–24 | Angola | Pavilion 2, Sydney; Referees: Tomaszewski, Adams (AUS) |
| 25 September 2000; 16:30 | Kim H. 6 | (14–16) | Bengue 10 | Pavilion 2, Sydney; Referees: Tomaszewski, Adams (AUS) |
| 25 September 2000; 16:30 | 3× (yellow card) 2× (suspension) | | 2× (yellow card) 1× (suspension) | Pavilion 2, Sydney; Referees: Tomaszewski, Adams (AUS) |

| 25 September 2000; 21:30 | France | 21–18 | Romania | Pavilion 2, Sydney; Referees: Kalin, Korić (SLO) |
| 25 September 2000; 21:30 | Myaro, Pecqueux-Rolland 6 | (11–10) | Luca 7 | Pavilion 2, Sydney; Referees: Kalin, Korić (SLO) |
| 25 September 2000; 21:30 | 3× (yellow card) 7× (suspension) | | 3× (yellow card) 3× (suspension) | Pavilion 2, Sydney; Referees: Kalin, Korić (SLO) |

=== Group B ===
| Pos | Team | Pld | W | D | L | GF | GA | GD | Pts | Qualification |
|---|---|---|---|---|---|---|---|---|---|---|
| 1 | Norway | 4 | 4 | 0 | 0 | 101 | 72 | +29 | 8 | Quarterfinals |
| 2 | Denmark | 4 | 3 | 0 | 1 | 124 | 83 | +41 | 6 | Quarterfinals |
| 3 | Austria | 4 | 2 | 0 | 2 | 131 | 90 | +41 | 4 | Quarterfinals |
| 4 | Brazil | 4 | 1 | 0 | 3 | 100 | 133 | −33 | 2 | Quarterfinals |
| 5 | Australia (H) | 4 | 0 | 0 | 4 | 59 | 137 | −78 | 0 | Ninth place game |

(H) Hosts

| 17 September 2000; 16:30 | Denmark | 17–19 | Norway | Pavilion 2, Sydney; Referees: Garcia, Moréno (FRA) |
| 17 September 2000; 16:30 | four players 3 | (7–10) | Bjerkrheim, Grini 4 | Pavilion 2, Sydney; Referees: Garcia, Moréno (FRA) |
| 17 September 2000; 16:30 | 3× (yellow card) 4× (suspension) | | 3× (yellow card) 2× (suspension) | Pavilion 2, Sydney; Referees: Garcia, Moréno (FRA) |

| 17 September 2000; 19:30 | Australia | 19–32 | Brazil | Pavilion 2, Sydney; Referees: Marić, Gardinovački (FRY) |
| 17 September 2000; 19:30 | Edland, Kahmke 4 | (7–15) | Roese, L. Silva 6 | Pavilion 2, Sydney; Referees: Marić, Gardinovački (FRY) |
| 17 September 2000; 19:30 | 3× (yellow card) 4× (suspension) | | 3× (yellow card) 4× (suspension) | Pavilion 2, Sydney; Referees: Marić, Gardinovački (FRY) |

| 19 September 2000; 14:30 | Norway | 28–18 | Australia | Pavilion 2, Sydney; Referees: Salim, Hassan (EGY) |
| 19 September 2000; 14:30 | Grini 13 | (12–11) | Boulton, Shinfield 4 | Pavilion 2, Sydney; Referees: Salim, Hassan (EGY) |
| 19 September 2000; 14:30 | 3× (yellow card) 4× (suspension) | | 3× (yellow card) 4× (suspension) | Pavilion 2, Sydney; Referees: Salim, Hassan (EGY) |

| 19 September 2000; 21:30 | Austria | 26–30 | Denmark | Pavilion 2, Sydney; Referees: Kohout, Dolejš (CZE) |
| 19 September 2000; 21:30 | Fridrikas 11 | (13–16) | Andersen, Kiærskou 7 | Pavilion 2, Sydney; Referees: Kohout, Dolejš (CZE) |
| 19 September 2000; 21:30 | 3× (yellow card) 1× (suspension) | | 2× (yellow card) 3× (suspension) | Pavilion 2, Sydney; Referees: Kohout, Dolejš (CZE) |

| 21 September 2000; 14:30 | Brazil | 26–45 | Austria | Pavilion 2, Sydney; Referees: Salim, Hassan (EGY) |
| 21 September 2000; 14:30 | L. Silva 8 | (14–21) | Fridrikas 11 | Pavilion 2, Sydney; Referees: Salim, Hassan (EGY) |
| 21 September 2000; 14:30 | 3× (yellow card) 7× (suspension) | | 3× (yellow card) 2× (suspension) | Pavilion 2, Sydney; Referees: Salim, Hassan (EGY) |

| 21 September 2000; 19:30 | Australia | 12–38 | Denmark | Pavilion 2, Sydney; Referees: Chung, Lim (KOR) |
| 21 September 2000; 19:30 | Kahmke 5 | (6–18) | Andersen, Roslyng 7 | Pavilion 2, Sydney; Referees: Chung, Lim (KOR) |
| 21 September 2000; 19:30 | 1× (yellow card) 2× (suspension) | | 3× (yellow card) 3× (suspension) | Pavilion 2, Sydney; Referees: Chung, Lim (KOR) |

| 23 September 2000; 16:30 | Brazil | 16–30 | Norway | Pavilion 2, Sydney; Referees: Chung, Lim (KOR) |
| 23 September 2000; 16:30 | S. Oliveira 4 | (7–18) | Grini 7 | Pavilion 2, Sydney; Referees: Chung, Lim (KOR) |
| 23 September 2000; 16:30 | 2× (yellow card) 5× (suspension) | | 3× (yellow card) 1× (suspension) | Pavilion 2, Sydney; Referees: Chung, Lim (KOR) |

| 23 September 2000; 19:30 | Austria | 39–10 | Australia | Pavilion 2, Sydney; Referees: Klucsó, Lekrinszky (HUN) |
| 23 September 2000; 19:30 | Logwin 8 | (17–6) | three players 2 | Pavilion 2, Sydney; Referees: Klucsó, Lekrinszky (HUN) |
| 23 September 2000; 19:30 | 2× (yellow card) 4× (suspension) 1× (red card) | | 3× (yellow card) 2× (suspension) | Pavilion 2, Sydney; Referees: Klucsó, Lekrinszky (HUN) |

| 25 September 2000; 14:30 | Denmark | 39–26 | Brazil | Pavilion 2, Sydney; Referees: Bojsen, Anusic (USA) |
| 25 September 2000; 14:30 | Kiærskou 9 | (19–12) | Sales 9 | Pavilion 2, Sydney; Referees: Bojsen, Anusic (USA) |
| 25 September 2000; 14:30 | 3× (yellow card) 1× (suspension) | | 3× (yellow card) 4× (suspension) | Pavilion 2, Sydney; Referees: Bojsen, Anusic (USA) |

| 25 September 2000; 19:30 | Norway | 24–21 | Austria | Pavilion 2, Sydney; Referees: Gallego, Lamas (ESP) |
| 25 September 2000; 19:30 | Grini 8 | (12–7) | Fridrikas 8 | Pavilion 2, Sydney; Referees: Gallego, Lamas (ESP) |
| 25 September 2000; 19:30 | 4× (yellow card) 5× (suspension) | | 4× (yellow card) 3× (suspension) | Pavilion 2, Sydney; Referees: Gallego, Lamas (ESP) |

== Knockout stage ==
=== Bracket ===
Quarterfinals
28 September
South Korea | 35
Brazil | 24
28 September
France | 26
Denmark (OT) | 28
28 September
Austria | 27
Hungary (OT) | 28
28 September
Norway | 28
Romania | 16

Semifinals
29 September
South Korea | 29
Denmark | 31
29 September
Hungary | 28
Norway | 23

Gold medal
1 October
Denmark | 31
Hungary | 27
Bronze medal
1 October
South Korea | 21
Norway | 22

5–8th place semifinals
30 September
Brazil | 23
France | 32
30 September
Austria | 29
Romania | 23

5th place
1 October
France | 32
Austria (OT) | 33
7th place
1 October
Brazil | 33
Romania (OT) | 38

=== Quarterfinals ===
| 28 September 2000; 14:30 | South Korea | 35–24 | Brazil | The Dome, Sydney; Referees: Klucsó, Lekrinszky (HUN) |
| 28 September 2000; 14:30 | Kim H. 9 | (19–12) | Sales 8 | The Dome, Sydney; Referees: Klucsó, Lekrinszky (HUN) |
| 28 September 2000; 14:30 | 3× (yellow card) 2× (suspension) | | 2× (yellow card) 4× (suspension) | The Dome, Sydney; Referees: Klucsó, Lekrinszky (HUN) |

28 September 2000
16:30
Austria
27–28 (ET)
Hungary
The Dome, Sydney
Referees: Kohout, Dolejš (CZE)
Logwin 9
(12–14)
Ág. Farkas 8
3× (yellow card) 8× (suspension) 1× (red card)

4× (yellow card) 7× (suspension)

FT: 25–25 ET: 2–3

28 September 2000
19:30
France
26–28 (ET)
Denmark
The Dome, Sydney
Referees: Marić, Gardinovački (FRY)
Myaro 11
(8–13)
Andersen 7
3× (yellow card) 1× (suspension)

3× (yellow card) 1× (suspension)

FT: 24–24 ET: 2–4

| 28 September 2000; 21:30 | Norway | 28–16 | Romania | The Dome, Sydney; Referees: Nachevski, Nachevski (MKD) |
| 28 September 2000; 21:30 | Grini 9 | (12–8) | Tănase 4 | The Dome, Sydney; Referees: Nachevski, Nachevski (MKD) |
| 28 September 2000; 21:30 | 3× (yellow card) 5× (suspension) | | 3× (yellow card) 5× (suspension) | The Dome, Sydney; Referees: Nachevski, Nachevski (MKD) |

=== 5–8th place semifinals ===
| 30 September 2000; 09:30 | Brazil | 23–32 | France | The Dome, Sydney; Referees: Kalin, Korić (SLO) |
| 30 September 2000; 09:30 | A. Silva 9 | (9–16) | Pecqueux-Rolland 12 | The Dome, Sydney; Referees: Kalin, Korić (SLO) |
| 30 September 2000; 09:30 | 3× (yellow card) 2× (suspension) | | 2× (yellow card) 5× (suspension) | The Dome, Sydney; Referees: Kalin, Korić (SLO) |

| 30 September 2000; 11:30 | Austria | 29–23 | Romania | The Dome, Sydney; Referees: Hansson, Olsson (SWE) |
| 30 September 2000; 11:30 | Fridrikas 8 | (12–12) | Drăgănescu 6 | The Dome, Sydney; Referees: Hansson, Olsson (SWE) |
| 30 September 2000; 11:30 | 3× (yellow card) 3× (suspension) | | 1× (yellow card) 4× (suspension) | The Dome, Sydney; Referees: Hansson, Olsson (SWE) |

=== Semifinals ===
| 29 September 2000; 19:30 | South Korea | 29–31 | Denmark | The Dome, Sydney; Referees: Gallego, Lamas (ESP) |
| 29 September 2000; 19:30 | Lee S., Oh S. 7 | (11–20) | Hoffmann 8 | The Dome, Sydney; Referees: Gallego, Lamas (ESP) |
| 29 September 2000; 19:30 | 3× (yellow card) 5× (suspension) | | 3× (yellow card) 4× (suspension) | The Dome, Sydney; Referees: Gallego, Lamas (ESP) |

| 29 September 2000; 21:30 | Hungary | 28–23 | Norway | The Dome, Sydney; Referees: Kalin, Korić (SLO) |
| 29 September 2000; 21:30 | Radulović 10 | (16–10) | Grini 13 | The Dome, Sydney; Referees: Kalin, Korić (SLO) |
| 29 September 2000; 21:30 | 3× (yellow card) 1× (suspension) | | 3× (yellow card) 3× (suspension) | The Dome, Sydney; Referees: Kalin, Korić (SLO) |

=== Ninth place game ===
| 28 September 2000; 12:30 | Angola | 26–18 | Australia | The Dome, Sydney; Referees: Salim, Hassan (EGY) |
| 28 September 2000; 12:30 | Mufuca 9 | (12–6) | Edland 6 | The Dome, Sydney; Referees: Salim, Hassan (EGY) |
| 28 September 2000; 12:30 | 3× (yellow card) 4× (suspension) | | 3× (yellow card) 3× (suspension) 1× (red card) | The Dome, Sydney; Referees: Salim, Hassan (EGY) |

=== Seventh place game ===
1 October 2000
09:30
Brazil
33–38 (ET)
Romania
The Dome, Sydney
Referees: Klucsó, Lekrinszky (HUN)
Sales 9
(15–17)
Tănase 11
3× (yellow card) 4× (suspension)

3× (yellow card) 1× (suspension)

FT: 32–32 ET: 1–6

=== Fifth place game ===
1 October 2000
11:30
France
32–33 (ET)
Austria
The Dome, Sydney
Referees: Marić, Gardinovački (FRY)
Ludwig 9
(8–13)
Logwin 12
3× (yellow card) 2× (suspension)

3× (yellow card) 1× (suspension)

FT: 25–25 ET: 7–8

=== Bronze medal game ===
| 1 October 2000; 14:30 | South Korea | 21–22 | Norway | The Dome, Sydney; Referees: Nachevski, Nachevski (MKD) |
| 1 October 2000; 14:30 | Oh S. 7 | (13–12) | Grini 7 | The Dome, Sydney; Referees: Nachevski, Nachevski (MKD) |
| 1 October 2000; 14:30 | 4× (yellow card) 6× (suspension) 1× (red card) | | 3× (yellow card) 1× (suspension) 1× (red card) | The Dome, Sydney; Referees: Nachevski, Nachevski (MKD) |

=== Gold medal game ===
| 1 October 2000; 16:30 | Denmark | 31–27 | Hungary | The Dome, Sydney; Referees: Garcia, Moréno (FRA) |
| 1 October 2000; 16:30 | Hoffmann 11 | (14–16) | Radulović 9 | The Dome, Sydney; Referees: Garcia, Moréno (FRA) |
| 1 October 2000; 16:30 | 3× (yellow card) 2× (suspension) | | 3× (yellow card) 1× (suspension) | The Dome, Sydney; Referees: Garcia, Moréno (FRA) |

== Rankings and statistics ==
=== Final ranking ===
| Rank | Team |
|---|---|
| 1st place, gold medalist(s) | Denmark |
| 2nd place, silver medalist(s) | Hungary |
| 3rd place, bronze medalist(s) | Norway |
| 4 | South Korea |
| 5 | Austria |
| 6 | France |
| 7 | Romania |
| 8 | Brazil |
| 9 | Angola |
| 10 | Australia |

=== All star team ===
| Position | Player |
|---|---|
| Goalkeeper | (Norway) Heidi Tjugum |
| Right wing | Janne Kolling |
| Right back | Bojana Radulovics |
| Line player | Veronique Pecqueux-Rolland |
| Central back | Oh Seong Ok |
| Left back | Kjersti Grini |
| Left wing | Anette Hoffmann |

=== Top goalscorers ===
| Rank | Name | Goals | Shots | % |
|---|---|---|---|---|
| 1 | (Norway) Kjersti Grini | 61 | 96 | 63.5 |
| 2 | (South Korea) Lee Sang-eun | 59 | 83 | 71.1 |
| 3 | (Austria) Ausra Fridrikas | 57 | 84 | 67.9 |
| 4 | (Hungary) Bojana Radulović | 55 | 101 | 54.5 |
| 5 | (Brazil) Maria de Sales | 43 | 98 | 43.9 |
| 6 | (Denmark) Camilla Andersen | 40 | 81 | 49.4 |
| 7 | (Angola) Ilda Bengue | 39 | 62 | 62.9 |
| 7 | (Austria) Tanja Logwin | 39 | 72 | 52.4 |
| 9 | (France) Véronique Pecqueux-Rolland | 38 | 43 | 88.4 |
| 10 | (Hungary) Ágnes Farkas | 37 | 77 | 48.1 |
