= Nicoleta Alina Dobrin =

Romanian handball player (born 1976)

Personal information
- Full name: Nicoleta Alina Dobrin
- Nationality: Romanian
- Born: August 1, 1976 (age 50) Bucharest, Romania
- Height: 1.70 m (5 ft 7 in)

Sport
- Sport: Handball
- Position: Left wing
- Current club: Retired

Youth career
- Years: Team
- –: CSȘ 5 București

Senior clubs
- Years: Team
- 1994–1997: RATB București
- 1997–2006: Rapid CFR București
- 2011–2014: CSM București
- 2014–2017: Rapid Metrou București
National team
Years	Team	Apps	(Gls)
1995–2003	Romania	154	(418)

Nicoleta Alina Dobrin (former Păcuraru; born 1 August 1976) is a Romanian handball player. She competed in the women's tournament at the 2000 Summer Olympics.

== Honours ==
National team

- Women's Youth World Championship:
  - Gold medal: 1995

Club

- EHF City Cup:
  - Winners: 2000
- Liga Națională:
  - Winners: 2003
