= Lucila Vianna da Silva =

Brazilian handball player (born 1976)

Lucila Vianna da Silva (born 7 March 1976) is a Brazilian handball player (central back). She has represented the Brazilian national team in three Olympics. She participated at the 2000 Summer Olympics in Sydney, at the 2004 Summer Olympics in Athens and at the 2008 Summer Olympics in China.
