= Leila Lejeune =

French handball player (born 1976)

Personal information
- Nationality: French
- Born: 16 March 1976 (age 50) Le Port, Réunion, France
- Height: 176 cm (69 in)

Sport
- Sport: Handball
- Position: Left back

Senior clubs
- Years: Team
- 1987–1994: Le Port
- 1994–2002: Metz Handball
- 2002-2004: Viborg HK
- 2004-2005: FCK Håndbold
National team
Years	Team	Apps	(Gls)
1995-2004	France	182	(751)
Medal record
Women's handball
Representing France
World Championship
Silver medal – second place	1999 Norway and Denmark	Team
Gold medal – first place	2003 Croatie	Team
Mediterranean Games
Gold medal – first place	2001 Tunis	Team

Leila Lejeune (née Duchemann; born 16 March 1976) is a French former handballer who played for the French national team. She is a world champion from 2003. She also represented France at the 2004 Summer Olympics in Athens. Lejeune scored six goals in the match against Hungary.

== International honours ==
National team

- World Championship:
  - Gold Medalist: 2003
  - Silver Medalist: 1999

Club

- EHF Cup:
  - Winner: 2004
