= Katalin Pálinger =

Hungarian handball player (born 1978)

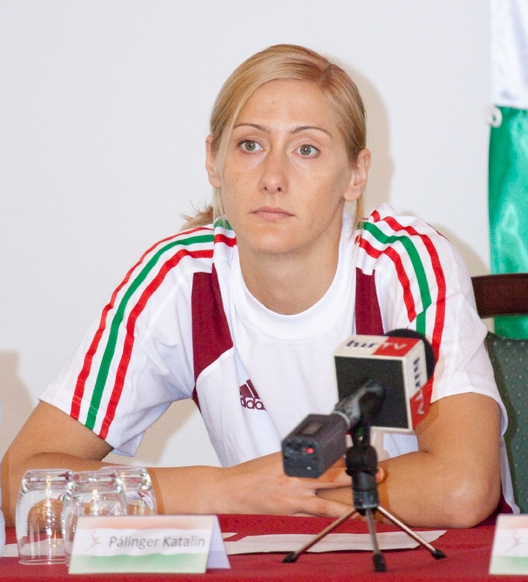
- Pálinger in 2011

Personal information
- Full name: Katalin Pálinger
- Nationality: Hungarian
- Born: 6 December 1978 (age 47) Mosonmagyaróvár, Hungary
- Height: 1.83 m (6 ft 0 in)

Sport
- Sport: Handball
- Position: Goalkeeper

Senior clubs
- Years: Team
- –2000: Győri ETO KC (HUN)
- 2000–2005: Dunaferr (HUN)
- 2005–2006: FCK Håndbold (DEN)
- 2006–2007: Krim Ljubljana (SLO)
- 2007–2012: Győri ETO KC (HUN)
National team
| Years | Team | Apps | (Gls) |
| 1997–2012 | Hungary | 254 | (1) |
Medal record
Olympic Games
| Silver medal – second place | 2000 Sydney | Team |
World Championship
| Silver medal – second place | 2003 Croatia |
| Bronze medal – third place | 2005 Russia |
European Championship
| Gold medal – first place | 2000 Romania |
| Bronze medal – third place | 1998 Netherlands |
| Bronze medal – third place | 2004 Hungary |
- Updated on 3 June 2012

Katalin Pálinger (born 6 December 1978) is a former Hungarian handball goalkeeper who most notably played for Győri ETO KC.

She was included in the European Handball Federation Hall of Fame in 2023.

== Career ==
She made her international debut on 22 August 1997 against Romania, and participated in her first World Championship in that year, however, she finished with the national team only on the disappointing ninth place. One year later, on the 1998 European Championship Hungary performed slightly better and captured a bronze medal, followed by a gold on the next continental event. Pálinger took part on another five European Championships (2002, 2004, 2006, 2008, 2010), achieving the best result in 2004 by winning a bronze.

In 2000, beside the European Championship title she has also won an Olympic silver, after losing out in an epic final against Denmark. The Scandinavians faced a six-goal deficit with less than fifteen minutes from the match, when the Hungarian team collapsed and the Danes went to win by four and took the gold medal. Pálinger participated on further two Olympic Games in 2004 and 2008 finishing fifth and fourth, respectively.

In addition, there are two World Championship medals on her success list, a silver from 2003 and a bronze from 2005. The shot-stopper has the experience of six World Championships under her belt, having been participated on every tournament between 1997 and 2007.

Pálinger announced her retirement from international handball on 11 June 2011, following the unsuccessful World Championship qualifying campaign. She made her farewell appearance on 3 June 2012 against Belarus in a European Championship qualifier. She currently acts as an assistant coach to the national team.

== Achievements ==
- Nemzeti Bajnokság I:
  - Winner: 2001, 2003, 2004, 2008, 2009, 2010, 2011, 2012
  - Silver Medalist: 2002, 2005
  - Bronze Medalist: 1998, 1999, 2000
- Magyar Kupa:
  - Winner: 2002, 2004, 2008, 2009, 2010, 2011, 2012
- Slovenian Championship:
  - Winner: 2007
- Slovenian Cup:
  - Winner: 2007
- EHF Champions League:
  - Finalist: 2009, 2012
  - Semifinalist: 2004, 2005, 2008, 2010, 2011
- EHF Cup:
  - Finalist: 1999, 2003
- Olympic Games:
  - Silver Medalist: 2000
- World Championship:
  - Silver Medalist: 2003
  - Bronze Medalsit: 2005
- European Championship:
  - Winner: 2000
  - Bronze Medalist: 1998, 2004

== Individual awards ==
- Hungarian Handballer of the Year: 2003, 2004, 2010
- European Handball Federation Hall of Fame in 2023.
