= Lotte Kiærskou =

Danish handball player (born 1975)

Personal information
- Nationality: Danish
- Born: 23 June 1975 (age 51) Frederikshavn, Denmark
- Height: 1.77 m (5 ft 10 in)

Sport
- Sport: Handball
- Position: Playmaker
- Current club: Retired

Youth career
- Years: Team
- 1981–1991: Strandby/Elling

Senior clubs
- Years: Team
- 1991–2001: Frederikshavn fI
- 2001–2005: Viborg HK
- 2006–2008: Randers HK
National team
Years	Team	Apps	(Gls)
1996–2005	Denmark	111	(414)

Teams managed
- 2006–2008: Randers HK (as player-assistant coach)
- –: Overlund GF
- 2014–2015: Viborg HK (assistant coach)
Medal record
Women's handball
Representing Denmark
Olympic Games
Gold medal – first place	2004 Athens	Team
Gold medal – first place	2000 Sydney	Team
European Championship
Silver medal – second place	1998 Netherlands	Team
- Updated on 19 April 2012

Lotte Kiærskou (born 23 June 1975) is a Danish former team handball player, and twice Olympic champion and former handball coach. She won a gold medal with the Danish national team at the 2000 Summer Olympics in Sydney, and the 2004 Summer Olympics in Athens.

== Handball career ==
Kiærskov started playing handball at age 6 at Strandby Ellinge IF. Later, she moved to Frederikshavn FI, where she came second in the Danish league in 1997. In 2001 she joined Viborg HK where she won the Danish league in 2002 and 2004, the Danish cup in 2003 and the EHF Cup in 2004.

She missed the 2002 European Championship, as she broke her finger the day before the tournament, and was replaced by Winnie Mølgaard. Denmark went on to win the tournament.

She skipped the 2005/2006 season due to pregnancy. Afterwards she joined Randers HK as a player-coach from 2006 to 2008. Later she coached the Overlund GF youth team, where her daughter played. From December 2014 she was the assistant coach at her former club Viborg HK. Due to medical operation she stopped coaching in February the following year.

== Personal life ==
Kiærskou is openly lesbian. She met fellow handballer Rikke Skov as teammates for Viborg HK, and "never had any thought to keep their relationship secret." They were in a registered partnership as allowed by Danish law, but split in 2011. Lotte, now retired from handball, works as a teacher in a school in Viborg and has two daughters with Skov.
