= List of Denmark women's international handball players =

This list contains players who have made 50 appearances or more for the Denmark women's national handball team.
Incomplete

== Key ==
	Tournament medalists at the: **Summer Olympics**: 1996 OG — 1996 Olympics - (gold) Winners; 2000 OG — 2000 Olympics - (gold) Winners; 2004 OG — 2004 Olympics - (gold) Winners; **World Championship**: 1957 WC — 1957 World Championship - (silver) Runners up; 1993 WC — 1993 World Championship - (silver) Runners up; 1995 WC — 1995 World Championship - (bronze) Third; 1997 WC — 1997 World Championship - (gold) Winners; 2013 WC — 2013 World Championship - (bronze) Third; 2021 WC — 2021 World Championship - (bronze) Third; 2023 WC — 2023 World Championship - (bronze) Third; **European Championship**: 1994 EC — 1994 European Championship - (gold) Winners; 1996 EC — 1996 European Championship - (gold) Winners; 1998 EC — 1998 European Championship - (silver) Runners up; 2002 EC — 2002 European Championship - (gold) Winners; 2004 EC — 2004 European Championship - (silver) Runners up; 2022 EC — 2022 European Championship - (silver) Runners up; 2024 EC — 2024 European Championship - (silver) Runners up
**Bold**	Currently available for selection. Correct as of 1 January 2025.
Pos	Positions
GK	Goalkeeper
CB	Center back
LB	Left back
RB	Right back
P	Pivot
LW	Left winger
RW	Right winger

== List of players ==
#	Player	Pos.	Apps.	Goals	Debut	Last	Medals	Ref.
1	Janne Kolling	LW	250	756	1988	2001	1993 WC (silver); 1994 EC (gold); 1995 WC (bronze); 1996 OG (gold); 1996 EC (gold); 1997 WC (bronze); 1998 EC (silver); 2000 OG (gold)	
2	Karin Mortensen	GK	233	4	2000	2012	2000 OG (gold); 2002 EC (gold); 2004 OG (gold)	
3	Lene Rantala	GK	230	0	1991	2011	1993 WC (silver); 1994 EC (gold); 1995 WC (bronze); 1996 OG (gold); 1996 EC (gold); 1997 WC (bronze); 2000 OG (gold); 2002 EC (gold)	
4	Trine Østergaard	RW	205	410	2011	2024	2013 WC (bronze); 2021 WC (bronze); 2022 EC (silver); 2023 WC (bronze); 2024 EC (silver)	
5	Sandra Toft	GK	195	2	2008	2024	2021 WC (bronze); 2022 EC (silver); 2023 WC (bronze); 2024 EC (silver)	
6	Camilla Andersen	CB	194	846	1992	2000	1993 WC (silver); 1994 EC (gold); 1995 WC (bronze); 1996 OG (gold); 1996 EC (gold); 1997 WC (bronze); 1998 EC (silver); 2000 OG (gold)	
7	Anne Mette Hansen	LB	186	555	2013	2024	2013 WC (bronze); 2021 WC (bronze); 2022 EC (silver); 2023 WC (bronze); 2024 EC (silver)	
8	Katrine Fruelund	LB	184	570	1997	2012	1998 EC (silver); 2000 OG (gold); 2002 EC (gold); 2004 OG (gold)	
9	Anette Hoffmann	LW	183	641	1990	2000	1993 WC (silver); 1994 EC (gold); 1995 WC (bronze); 1996 OG (gold); 1996 EC (gold); 1997 WC (bronze); 1998 EC (silver); 2000 OG (gold)	
9	Louise Burgaard	RB	183	379	2011	2024	2013 WC (bronze); 2021 WC (bronze); 2022 EC (silver); 2023 WC (bronze)	
11	Mette Vestergaard	RB	181	519	1995	2005	1996 EC (gold); 1998 EC (silver); 2000 OG (gold); 2002 EC (gold); 2004 OG (gold)	
12	Anne-Marie Nielsen		180	301	1959	1975	1962 WC (silver)	
13	Susanne Munk Lauritsen	GK	171	3	1987	2000	1993 WC (silver); 1994 EC (gold); 1995 WC (bronze); 1996 OG (gold); 1996 EC (gold); 1997 WC (bronze); 1998 EC (silver)	
14	Annette Dahl	GK	164	0	1967	1981		
15	Kristina Kristiansen	CB	155	378	2007	2017	2013 WC (bronze)	
16	Rikke Skov	LB	152	384	2000	2016	1998 EC (silver); 2004 OG (gold); 2004 EC (silver)	
17	Line Jørgensen	RB	149	352	2007	2018	2013 WC (bronze)	
18	Helle L. Petersen		148	310	1982	1991	1998 EC (silver)	
18	Stine Jørgensen	CB	148	487	2010	2019	2013 WC (bronze)	
20	Kathrine Heindahl	P	145	280	2010	2024	2021 WC (bronze); 2022 EC (silver); 2023 WC (bronze)	
21	Karen Brødsgaard	P	140	288	1998	2007	1998 EC (silver); 2000 OG (gold); 2002 EC (gold); 2004 OG (gold); 2004 EC (silver)	
22	Marianne Vilstrup	GK	140	0	1967	1985		
23	Tonje Kjærgaard	P	139	342	1994	2000	1994 EC (gold); 1996 OG (gold); 1996 EC (gold); 1997 WC (bronze); 1998 EC (silver); 2000 OG (gold)	
24	Ann Grete Nørgaard	LW	139	549	2007	2016	2013 WC (bronze)	
25	Pernille Holmsgaard	LB	136	124	2006	2016	2013 WC (bronze)	
26	Gitte Sunesen	GK	135	1	1991	2000	1994 EC (gold); 1995 WC (bronze); 1996 OG (gold); 1996 EC (gold); 1997 WC (bronze); 1998 EC (silver)	
27	Trine Troelsen	LB	134	341	2006	2014		
28	Anja Andersen	CB	133	725	1989	1998	1993 WC (silver); 1994 EC (gold); 1995 WC (bronze); 1996 OG (gold); 1996 EC (gold); 1997 WC (bronze)	
29	Kristina Jørgensen	LB	132	388	2017	2024	2021 WC (bronze); 2022 EC (silver); 2023 WC (bronze); 2024 EC (silver)	
30	Susan Thorsgaard	P	131	216	2007	2015	2013 WC (bronze)	
30	Althea Reinhardt	GK	131	0	2016	2024	2021 WC (bronze); 2022 EC (silver); 2023 WC (bronze); 2024 EC (silver)	
31	Christina Roslyng	LW	129	299	1998	2004	1998 EC (silver); 2000 OG (gold); 2002 EC (gold)	
32	Rikke Hørlykke	CB	125	234	2000	2005	2002 EC (gold); 2004 OG (gold); 2004 EC (silver)	
33	Josephine Touray	RW	123	383	2001	2008	2002 EC (gold); 2004 OG (gold); 2004 EC (silver)	
33	Vibeke Nielsen		123	341	1982	1989		
35	Mie Højlund	LB	122	252	2016	2024	2021 WC (bronze); 2022 EC (silver); 2023 WC (bronze); 2024 EC (silver)	
36	Heidi Bruun		120	284	1986	1991		
36	Tina Bøttzau	RB	120	247	1990	2000	1993 WC (silver); 1995 WC (bronze); 1996 OG (gold); 1996 EC (gold); 1997 WC (bronze); 2000 OG (gold)	
36	Gitte Madsen		120	288	1991	1998	1993 WC (silver); 1995 WC (bronze); 1996 OG (gold); 1996 EC (gold); 1997 WC (bronze)	
37	Astrid Friis Larsen		119	223	1983	1991		
38	Bente Solsbæk		118	236	1982	1989		
38	Line Haugsted	LB	118	148	2014	2023	2021 WC (bronze); 2023 WC (bronze); 2024 EC (silver)	
41	Mona Christensen		117	27	1967	1976		
32	Mette Tranborg	RB	123	266	2014	2024	2021 WC (bronze); 2022 EC (silver); 2024 EC (silver)	
43	Lene Lund Høy Karlsen	P	115	181	2003	2009		
44	Birte Carlsen		113	375	1967	1983		
45	Lotte Grigel	CB	112	163	2008	2020		
46	Lotte Kiærskou	CB	111	414	1996	2004	1998 EC (silver); 2000 OG (gold); 2004 OG (gold)	
64	Sarah Iversen	P	110	184	2015	2024	2022 EC (silver); 2023 WC (bronze); 2024 EC (silver)	
47	Marianne Florman	LW	107	170	1990	1997	1993 WC (silver); 1994 EC (gold); 1995 WC (bronze); 1996 OG (gold); 1996 EC (gold)	
48	Kristine Andersen	CB	106	305	1996	2004	1996 OG (gold); 1996 EC (gold); 1998 EC (silver); 2002 EC (gold); 2004 OG (gold)	
49	Heidi Astrup	CB	104	269	1990	2007	1994 EC (gold); 1996 OG (gold); 1996 EC (gold)	
49	Rikke Schmidt	GK	104	0	1999	2006	2000 OG (gold); 2004 OG (gold); 2004 EC (silver)	
51	Line Daugaard	LW	103	307	1999	2004	2002 EC (gold); 2004 OG (gold)	
52	Tove Okkerstrøm		101	191	1978	1983		
53	Kristina Bille	RW	100	155	2005	2013		
	Rikke Iversen	P	99	155	2015	2024	2021 WC (bronze); 2022 EC (silver); 2023 WC (bronze); 2024 EC (silver)	
54	Louise Mortensen	CB	97	205	2003	2009		
56	Ann Andreasen		88	150	1967	1981		
56	Anne Dorthe Tanderup	RB	88	180	1991	1997	1993 WC (silver); 1994 EC (gold); 1995 WC (bronze); 1996 OG (gold); 1996 EC (gold); 1997 WC (bronze)	
56	Anja Byrial	P	88	122	1992	1996	1993 WC (silver); 1994 EC (gold); 1995 WC (bronze); 1996 OG (gold); 1996 EC (gold)	
60	Ingelise Mortensen		85	175	1986	1991		
60	Mette Sjøberg	LB	85	262	2003	2008	2004 EC (silver)	
62	Rikke Solberg	CB	84	185	1991	1996	1993 WC (silver); 1994 EC (gold); 1995 WC (bronze)	
63	Mette Melgaard	P	82	88	2001	2012		
64	Emma Friis	LW	79	239	2018	2024	2023 WC (bronze); 2024 EC (silver)	
65	Joan Johnsen		74	137	1982	1985		
66	Anette Jacobsen		73	91	1967	1979		
67	Stine Bodholt	P	71	105	2014	2019		
68	Conny Hamann	CB	70	158	1989	1996	1993 WC (silver); 1994 EC (gold); 1995 WC (bronze); 1996 OG (gold)	
69	Vivi Kjærsgaard		68	94	1987	1993	1993 WC (silver); 1995 WC (bronze)	
70	Birgitte Volck		67	99	1981	1985		
72	Ditte Andersen	LW	65	108	2001	2005	2002 EC (gold)	
73	Lærke Nolsøe	LW	62	135	2015	2022	2021 WC (bronze)	
74	Heidi Johansen	P	61	67	2001	2005	2002 EC (gold)	
75	Tina Nielsen		59	81	1978	1983		
75	Louise Pedersen	RW	59	119	1999	2010		
77	Marianne Bonde Pedersen	P	58	50	2008	2014	2013 WC (bronze)	
78	Pia Anderson	P	57	95	1985	1990		
78	Simone Petersen	CB	57	92	2021	2024	2023 WC (bronze)	
80	Camilla Thomsen	P	56	89	2002	2004	2002 EC (gold); 2004 OG (gold); 2004 EC (silver)	
81	Anne Grete Vilhelmsen	GK	55	0	1967	1975		
81	Lise-Lotte Lauridsen		55	134	1990	1994	1993 WC (silver); 1995 WC (bronze)	
81	Louise Bager Due	GK	55	1	2002	2007	2002 EC (gold); 2004 OG (gold); 2004 EC (silver)	
81	Anette Bonde Christensen		55	92	2002	2008		
85	Connie Pedersen		54	104	1987	1990		
85	Trine Jensen	RB	54	87	2001	2007	2002 EC (gold); 2004 OG (gold)	
85	Rikke Nielsen	P	54	68	2003	2006	2004 EC (silver)	
88	Andrea Aagot	RW	54	99	2020	2024	2023 WC (bronze); 2024 EC (silver)	
89	Tine Mortensen		53	120	1985	1989		
90	Simone Böhme	RW	52	59	2015	2022	2021 WC (bronze)	
91	Pernille Hansen	P	51	70	1999	2001		
91	Lise Knudsen		51	80	2003	2007	2004 EC (silver)	
91	Lærke Winther Møller	CB	51	139	2007	2014		
94	Maibritt Benda		50	82	1988	1991		
