= Therese Wallter =

Swedish handball player (born 1982)

Personal information
- Nationality: Swedish
- Born: 1 May 1982 (age 44) Helsingborg, Sweden
- Height: 1.84 m (6 ft 0 in)

Sport
- Sport: Handball
- Position: Pivot
- Current club: Retired

Youth career
- Years: Team
- -2000: Olympic/Viking HK

Senior clubs
- Years: Team
- 2000-2001: Kävlinge HK
- 2001-2007: Skövde HF
- 2007-2008: Frederikshavn FOX (Denmark)
- 2008-2010: Aalborg DH (Denmark)
- 2010-2011: Skövde HF
- 2011-2012: Lugi HF
- 2012-2014: OV Helsingborg
National team
Years	Team	Apps	(Gls)
2005-2011	Sweden	44	(38)
Medal record
European Championship
Silver medal – second place	2010 Denmark/Norway	Team

Therese Wallter is a Swedish former team handball player. She played for the Swedish women's national handball team. At the 2010 European Women's Handball Championship she reached the final and won a silver medal with the Swedish team.

Her career started showing promise at Skövde HF, where she reached to finals of the Swedish Championship three times. In 2007 she moved to Denmark to join Frederikshavn FOX, where she played for a year before joining Aalborg DH. Here she won silver medals in the Danish league, before returning to Skövde HF.
