= Johanna Wiberg =

Swedish handball player (born 1983)

Personal information
- Full name: Maria Johanna Wiberg
- Nationality: Swedish
- Born: 6 July 1983 (age 43) Lund, Sweden
- Height: 1.84 m (6 ft 0 in)

Sport
- Sport: Handball
- Position: Defender / Pivot
- Current club: Retired

Youth career
- Years: Team
- -2001: KFUM Lundagård

Senior clubs
- Years: Team
- 2001-2004: Eslövs IK
- 2004-2006: FOX Team Nord (Denmark)
- 2006-2007: Aalborg DH (Denmark)
- 2007-2010: FCK Håndbold (Denmark)
- 2010-2012: Eslövs IK
National team
Years	Team	Apps	(Gls)
2002-2012	Sweden	145	(95)

Teams managed
- 2012-2014: Lugi HF
- 2020-: Sweden
Medal record
European Championship
Silver medal – second place	2010 Denmark/Norway	Team

Johanna Wiberg (born 6 July 1983) is a Swedish former handball player and coach. She played for the club FCK Håndbold, Aalborg DH and FOX Team Nord in Denmark and Eslövs IK in Sweden, as well as for the Swedish national team. She participated at the 2008 Summer Olympics in China, where the Swedish team placed eighth, and the 2012 Summer Olympics, where the Swedish team placed eleventh.

She retired in 2012 to start her coaching career at Lugi HF. In 2020 she became the assistant coach at the Swedish national team.
