= Teresa Utković =

Swedish handball player (born 1980)

Personal information
- Nationality: Swedish
- Born: 31 July 1980 (age 46) Gothenburg, Sweden
- Height: 1.70 m (5 ft 7 in)

Sport
- Sport: Handball

Senior clubs
- Years: Team
- -1998: Karra HF
- 1998-2003: IK Sävehof
- 2003-2006: Frederikshavn FOX Team Nord (Denmark)
- 2006-2007: TV Beyeröhde (Germany)
- 2007-2009: IK Sävehof
- 2009: Aalborg DH (Denmark)
- 2016: Boden Handboll IF
National team
Years	Team	Apps	(Gls)
–	Sweden	79	(172)

Teresa Utković (born 31 July 1980) is a Swedish former handball player of Croatian descent. She has formerly played for Danish clubs Aalborg DH and FOX Team Nord, and German side TV Beyeröhde. She retired in 2009 to focus on a civil career. She did however return in 2016 to play for Boden Handboll IF for the playoff to promote to the Swedish top flight.

Teresa's father Branko was from Žerava, a village near Zadar. She has younger brother, Rikard Utković.
