= Ditte Andersen =

Danish handball player (born 1975)

Personal information
- Full name: Ditte Due Andersen
- Born: 27 January 1975 (age 51) Vissenbjerg, Denmark

Sport
- Sport: Handball
- Position: Left back

Senior clubs
- Years: Team
- 1998–2004: GOG Håndbold
- 2004–2005: Ikast-Bording EH
- 2005: Horsens HK
- 2005–2007: GOG Håndbold
- 2007–2008: Odense HF
National team
Years	Team	Apps	(Gls)
2001–2005	Denmark	65	(108)

Teams managed
- 2008–2009: Odense Håndbold (Assistant)
Medal record
European Championship
Gold medal – first place	2002 Denmark	Team competition
- Updated on 21 April 2011

Ditte Due Andersen (born 27 January 1975) is a Danish former handball player, coach, and sporting director.

== Career ==
She started her handball career at GOG, where she played until 2004. After a cruciate ligament injury she signed a three year contract with Ikast.

Just a year after signing for Ikast, she joined Horsens HK instead in search of more playing time. Later the same year she returned to GOG, where she played until 2007. She then joined Odense HF, where she played for a year.

She became the sporting director in Odense Håndbold i 2009 and continued when the club became HC Odense.

In October 2012 she withdrew from the position to be replaced by Bent Nyegaard.

== National team ==
Andersen played for the Danish national team from 2001 to 2005, where she reached 65 national team games, scoring 97 goals. Her national team debut was on 23 March 2001 against Germany.

At the 2001 World Women's Handball Championship she finished finished 4th with the Danish team.

Her biggest achievement was winning the 2002 European Women's Handball Championship.

In 2003 she had a Cruciate ligament injury, which meant she did not play a match for Denmark for all of 2004.

She returned to the national team in the fall of 2005, and was part of the Denmark team for the 2005 World Women's Handball Championship, where Denmark once again finished 4th. The bronze match against Hungary became her last national team match.
