= Lina Olsson Rosenberg =

Norwegian handball player (born 1971)

Medal record

Representing Norway

Women's handball

European Championship
Silver medal – second place	2002 Denmark	Team

Lina Olsson Rosenberg (born 27 December 1971 in Norrköping, Sweden) is a Swedish handball player who played for the Norwegian club Larvik HK, and later obtained Norwegian citizenship and played for the Norway women's national handball team.

She made her debut on the Norwegian national team in 2002, and played on this team at the 2002 European Women's Handball Championship, when Norway received a silver medal. She played 24 matches and scored 92 goals for Norway's national team.

== Club career ==
Olsson was voted Player of the year in the Norwegian league in 1996, and again in 1997.

She reached the Women's EHF Cup final in 1996 with Larvik HK, and reached the Women's EHF Cup Winners' Cup semi finals in 1997.
