= Frida Toveby =

Swedish handball player (born 1982)

Personal information
- Full name: Frida Linnea Toveby
- Nationality: Swedish
- Born: 29 July 1982 (age 44) Gothenburg, Sweden
- Height: 174 cm (69 in)

Sport
- Sport: Handball
- Position: Pivot
- Current club: retired

Senior clubs
- Years: Team
- 2003-2008: IK Sävehof
- 2008-2010: Aalborg DH
- 2010-2011: IK Sävehof
National team
Years	Team	Apps	(Gls)
2003-2009	Sweden	22	(22)

Frida Toveby (born 1982) is a Swedish former handball player.

== Life and career ==
Born in Gothenburg on 29 July 1982, Toveby played for the club Aalborg DH in Denmark and IK Sävehof in Sweden. She also played for the Swedish national team. She participated at the 2008 Summer Olympics in China, where the Swedish team placed eight. She entered the team as a reserve and got on the team when Therese Helgesson was injured.

She won the Swedish championship twice; in 2005-06 and 2006-07 with IK Sävehöf. In 2008 she joined Aalborg DH where she played for 2 seasons. She then returned to Sweden to play one last season at IK Sävehöf. Here she won the Swedish championship for a third time.

Other than the 2008 Olympics, her only other major international tournament was the 2008 European Women's Handball Championship, where Sweden went out in the main round.
