= Aalborg DH =

Danish handball club

Coordinates: 57°1′5″N 9°57′45″E

- Full name: Aalborg Damehåndbold
- Short name: ADH
- Founded: 2001; 25 years ago
- Dissolved: 3 September 2013; 12 years ago
- Arena: Gigantium Arena
- Capacity: 4,500

Aalborg Damehåndbold is a former team handball club for women from Aalborg, Denmark.

== History ==
Aalborg DH was promoted to the top league in Denmark in 2002–2003. The club finished as runner up in the top league once, and secured third place in 2005–2006. In the 2005–2006 season the club reached the semi-final in the Women's EHF Champions League.

Aalborg DH was on 3 September 2013 declared bankrupt. Ringkøbing Håndbold were offered their place in the league, which they accepted. In 2014 the club Team Abybro, which would later become EH Aalborg was founded in an attempt to recreate a professional women's team around Aalborg and Northern Jutland in general.

== Former players ==
- (Denmark) Louise Mortensen (2003–2010)
- (Denmark) Lærke Møller (2006–2009)
- (Denmark) Mathilde Nielsen (2012–2013)
- (Denmark) Rikke Nielsen (1997–2006, 2007–2008)
- (Denmark) Louise Pedersen (2004–2008)
- (Denmark) Sabine Pedersen (2010–2012)
- (Denmark) Rikke Schmidt (2005–2006)
- (Denmark) Søs Søby (2009–2013)
- (Denmark) Rikke Vestergaard (2006–2007, 2009–2011)
- (Denmark) Julie Aagaard (2009–2011)
- (Denmark) Heidi Astrup (2003–2005)
- (Denmark) Kristina Bille (2007–2010)
- (Denmark) Karen Brødsgaard (2007–2010)
- (Denmark) Rikke Ebbesen (2009–2013)
- (Denmark) Trine Nielsen (2004–2006)
- (Denmark) Louise Kristensen (2009–2011)
- (Denmark) Pernille Larsen (2007–2009)
- (Norway) Mia Hundvin (2003–2004)
- (Norway) Katrine Lunde Haraldsen (2004–2007)
- (Norway) Kristine Lunde-Borgersen (2004–2007)
- (Norway) Heidi Løke (2007–2008)
- (Norway) Nora Mørk (2007)
- (Norway) Thea Mørk (2007)
- (Norway) Marianne Rokne (2005–2006)
- (Norway) Isabel Blanco (2004–2006)
- (Norway) Siri Seglem (2009–2013)
- (Sweden) Maria Olsson (2012–2013)
- (Sweden) Linnea Torstenson (2008–2010)
- (Sweden) Teresa Utković (2008–2009)
- (Sweden) Johanna Ahlm (2009–2010)
- (Sweden) Therese Wallter (2008–2010)
- (Sweden) Johanna Wiberg (2006–2007)
- (Sweden) Madeleine Grundström (2008–2009)
- (Sweden) Frida Toveby (2008–2010)
- (Sweden) Matilda Boson (2005–2010)
- (Hungary) Ibolya Mehlmann (2006–2008)
- (Hungary) Ágnes Farkas (2003–2005)
- (Hungary) Barbara Bognár (2007–2008)
- (Austria) Kristina Logvin (2012–2013)
- (Austria) Tanja Logwin (2006–2009)
- (France) Julie Goiorani (2010–2011)
- (France) Mariama Signaté (2010–2011)
- (Iceland) Arna Sif Pálsdóttir (2011–2013)
- (Romania) Narcisa Lecușanu (2004–2006)
- (Serbia) Ana Batinić (2009–2011)
- (Netherlands) Natasja Burgers (2005–2006)
- (Russia) Natalya Deryugina (2003–2008)

== Head coach history ==
(Denmark)	Christian Dalmose	2004–2007
(Denmark)	Jan Leslie	2007
(Norway)	Leif Gautestad	2007–2008
(Denmark)	Allan Heine	2008; 2010–2013
(Sweden)	Björn Blomquist	2008–2010
