= Tine Ladefoged =

Danish handball player (born 1977)

Personal information
- Full name: Tine Ladefoged Pedersen
- Nationality: Danish
- Born: 6 August 1977 (age 49) Randers, Denmark
- Height: 1.92 m (6 ft 4 in)

Sport
- Sport: Handball
- Position: Left Back
- Current club: Retired
- Number: 31

Senior clubs
- Years: Team
- 1998-2017: Horsens HK
National team
Years	Team	Apps	(Gls)
2002-2004	Denmark	27	(72)

Tine Ladefoged Pedersen (born 6 August 1977) is a Danish former handballer who played for Horsens HK her entire career. She stopped her active career in 2005 when she was 27 years. On the Danish national team she played 27 games and scored 72 goals.
