= Karen Brødsgaard =

Danish handball player (born 1978)

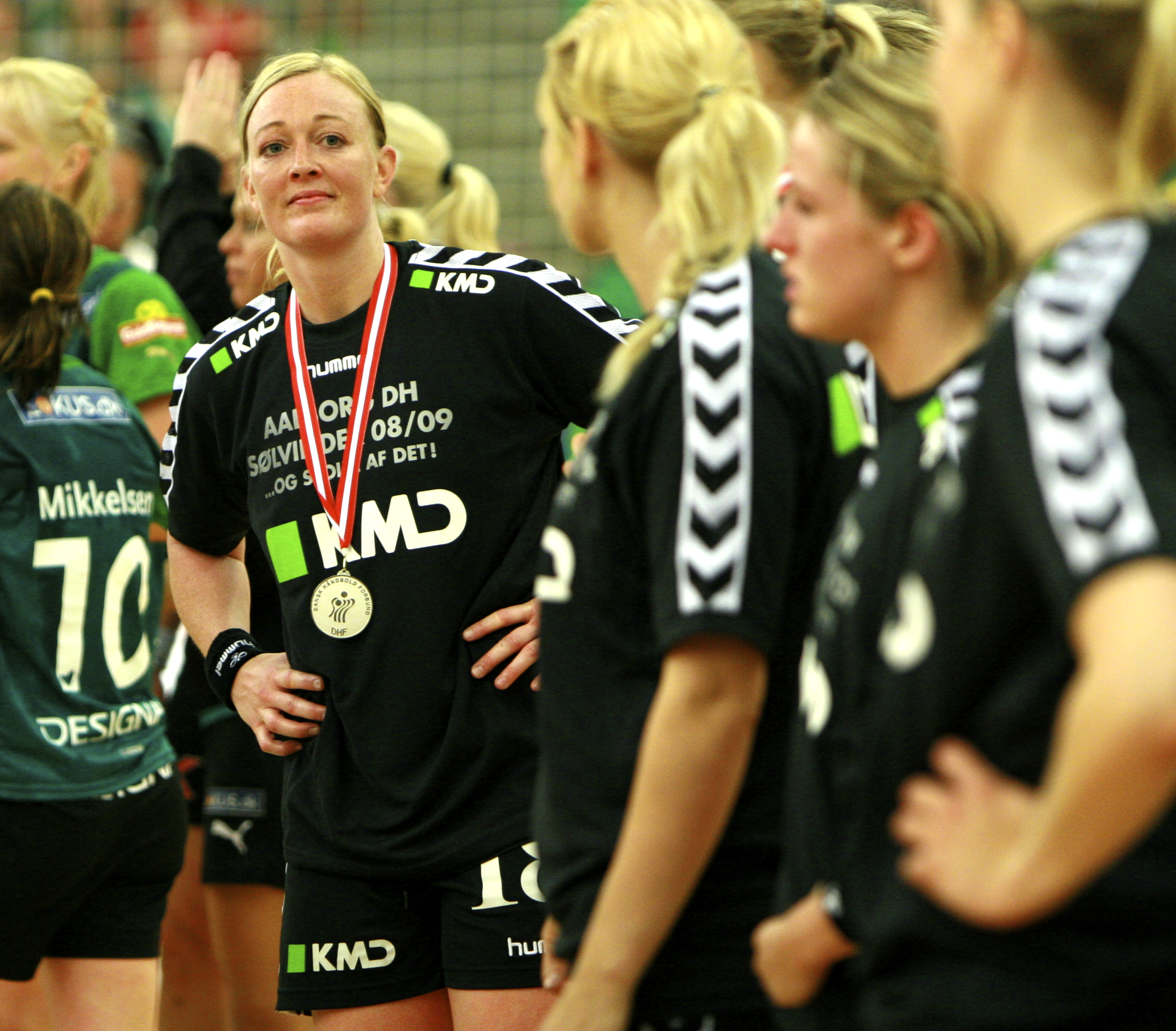
- Brødsgaard (left) with her silver medal after the Danish championship final in 2009

Personal information
- Nationality: Danish
- Born: 10 March 1978 (age 48) Horsens, Denmark
- Height: 178 cm (70 in)

Sport
- Sport: Handball
- Position: Line player

Youth career
- Years: Team
- –: Gedved
- –: Stensballe
- –: Horsens HK

Senior clubs
- Years: Team
- 1998–2003: Viborg HK
- 2004: Larvik HK
- 2004–2007: Ikast-Bording Elitehåndbold
- 2007–2010: Aalborg DH
National team
Years	Team	Apps	(Gls)
1998-2007	Denmark	140	(288)

Teams managed
- 2010–2012: Aalborg DH (assistant coach)
- 2016–2018: Alingsås HK (assistant coach)
- 2018–2019: EH Aalborg
- 2019–22: Odense Håndbold (assistant coach)
- 2020: Odense Håndbold (interim head coach)
Medal record
Women's handball
Representing Denmark
Olympic Games
Gold medal – first place	2000 Sydney	Team competition
Gold medal – first place	2004 Athens	Team competition
European Championship
Gold medal – first place	2002 Denmark	Team competition
Silver medal – second place	1998 Netherlands	Team competition
Silver medal – second place	2004 Hungary	Team competition
- Updated on 2024

Karen Brødsgaard (born 10 March 1978) is a Danish former team handball player and manager, and two times Olympic champion. She received gold medals with the Danish national team at the 2000 Summer Olympics in Sydney and at the 2004 Summer Olympics in Athens, where she was the captain of the team.

With Viborg HK she won the Danish League four times in a row in 1999, 2000, 2001 and 2002, the EHF European League in 1999 and reached the EHF Champions League final in 2001.

== Managing career ==
Karen Brødsgaard ended her career at Aalborg DH, and immediately became an assistant coach, a position she held until 2012.

In 2016 Karen Brødsgaard became assistant coach for Alingsås HK men's team in Sweden. In 2018 she switched to become the manager of EH Aalborg in Denmark. EH Aalborg was at the time playing in the second tier the 1st Division. In her first season in charge Karen Brødsgaard managed to get them promoted to the top league.

Her tenure at EH Aalborg did however not last long. During the following season (2019-2020), she announced her intention to leave the club to become assistant manager assistant manager of Odense Håndbold under Jan Pytlick the following season. Only 6 days later she was fired at EH Aalborg, with the disappointing points accumulated cited as the reason. At the time EH Aalborg was in last place in the league with only 5 points to their name. EH Aalborg was relegated that season.

During her tenure at Odense Håndhold she won the Danish Cup and the Danish league in the 2020-2021 season. After three years in Odense, they parted ways in 2022 when her contract expired.
