= Heidi Johansen (handballer) =

Danish handball player (born 1982)

Personal information
- Nationality: Danish
- Born: 5 April 1978 (age 48) Randers, Denmark

Sport
- Sport: Handball
- Position: Pivot

Senior clubs
- Years: Team
- 1996-1998: Vorup FB
- 1998-1999, 2000-2002: Randers HK
- 2002-2004: FOX Team Nord
- 2004-2008: Randers HK
National team
Years	Team	Apps	(Gls)
2001-2005	Denmark	61	(67)
Medal record
European Championship
Gold medal – first place	2002 Denmark

Heidi Johansen (born 5 April 1978) is a Danish former handball player. She is a European champion from 2002.

She started her career at Vorup FB, where she played together with later national team colleagues Merete Møller and Katrine Fruelund. After 2 years she joined the local top league team Randers HK. She played in Randers for three years, broken up by a long travel period around the world. Afterwards she joined Frederikshavn FOX Team Nord for two years, before returning to Randers HK. In 2005 she extended her contract with another year. The reason for the relatively short extension, was according to her that she could feel handball taking a toll on her body, and therefore only wanted to extend with one year at a time.

In 2006-07 she missed the entire championship playoff due to a cruciate ligament injury. When she retired in 2008 she had the fourth most appearances for Randers HK with 190 appearances.
