= Rikke Nielsen =

Danish handball player (born 1977)

Personal information
- Nationality: Danish
- Born: 9 April 1977 (age 49) Brovst, Denmark
- Height: 1.72 m (5 ft 8 in)

Sport
- Sport: Handball
- Position: Line Player
- Current club: Retired

Youth career
- Years: Team
- 1992–1995: Fjerritslev
- 1995–1996: Thisted IK

Senior clubs
- Years: Team
- 1995–1996: Thisted IK
- 1996–1997: Brønderslev IF
- 1997–2000: Ålborg KFUM
- 2000–2006: HS Nord
- 2006–2007: HC Leipzig (Germany)
- 2007–2008: Aalborg DH
National team
Years	Team	Apps	(Gls)
2003–2006	Denmark	54	(68)
Medal record
Representing Denmark
Silver medal – second place	2004 Hungary

Rikke Nielsen (born 9 April 1977) is a Danish former handballer. She previously played for Aalborg DH, and before that she played for the German club HC Leipzig. Before this she played for Aalborg DH and its parent club HS Nord. She won silver medals at the European Championships in 2004. In all she played 54 national games and scored 68 goals. Her first national game was 25 September 2003.

She retired in 2008 due to a thumb injury.

== Lykkeliga ==
In 2017 Nielsen established the initiative Lykkeliga (English: Happiness League), a handball league for people with Downs Syndrome.
