= Városi Sportcsarnok (Békéscsaba) =

Multi-use indoor stadium in Békéscsaba, Hungary

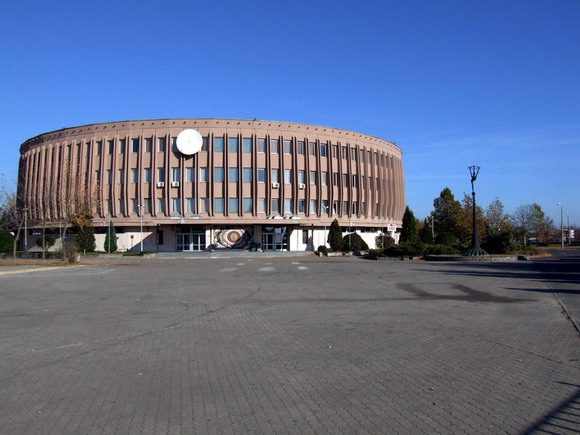
- Interactive map of Városi Sportcsarnok
- Location: Békéscsaba, Hungary
- Coordinates: 46.68245°N 21.1133°E
- Owner: City of Békéscsaba
- Capacity: 2,300 (handball)

Construction
- Opened: 1988
- Renovated: 2004

Tenant
- Békéscsabai Előre NKSE

The Városi Sportcsarnok (English: Municipal Sports Hall) is a multi-use indoor stadium in Békéscsaba, Hungary. The arena, which has an oval shape, very similar to the Colosseum, was opened in 1988, and has been modernized and renovated for the 2004 European Women's Handball Championship, to fulfil the strict criteria of the European Handball Federation.

It is the home ground of the local sports clubs, from which the best known is Békéscsabai Előre NKSE, that usually play in a sold-out arena. The sports hall also hosts martial art events, futsal matches, galas, expos, balls, dance competitions and motocross races. In the building of the arena runs the Sport Hotel, which offers rooms in all comfort levels with additional services such as gym, massage, sauna and solarium.

Two internationally recognized gastronomic events, the Beer Festival and Knuckle Parade and the Sausage Festival also takes place in the Városi Sportcsarnok and in the surrounding area in every year.
