= Kjersti Beck =

Norwegian handball player (born 1979)

Personal information
- Nationality: Norwegian
- Born: September 5, 1979 (age 47)

Sport
- Sport: Handball
- Position: goalkeeper
- Current club: Retired

Senior clubs
- Years: Team
- –: Viken BK
- 1998–2000: Byåsen IL
- 2000–2002: Sletne IL
- 2002–2006: Byåsen IL
- 2006–2008: BM Mar Valencia
- 2010–2013: Gjøvik HK
National team
Years	Team	Apps	(Gls)
2004–2007	Norway	42	(0)
Medal record
Women's handball
European Championship
Gold medal – first place	2004 Hungary	Team
Women's beach handball
World Games
Bronze medal – third place	2013 Cali	Team competition
European Beach Championship
Bronze medal – third place	2013 Randers	Team competition

Kjersti Beck (born 5 September 1979) is a Norwegian former handball goalkeeper for the Norwegian National Team.

== Indoor career ==
She played for BM Mar Valencia and Byåsen I.L., and has also worked as a Radio host for Radio Adressa, and is a qualified physical therapist.

She has played 28 games for the National Team, and won the European Championship in 2004.

She retired in 2013.

== Beach handball ==
In 2013 she participated in 2013 European Beach Handball Championship in Randers, Denmark, where Norway took Bronze medals, beeting Ukraine in third-place playoff. She also played at the 2013 World Games, where Norway once again won bronzemedals, losing to Hungary in the semifinal, and beating Chinese Taipei in the third-place playoff.

== Post playing Career ==
She worked as project coordinator on the 2016 Youth Olympics in Lillehammer.
