= Madeleine Gustafsson =

Swedish handball player (born 1980)

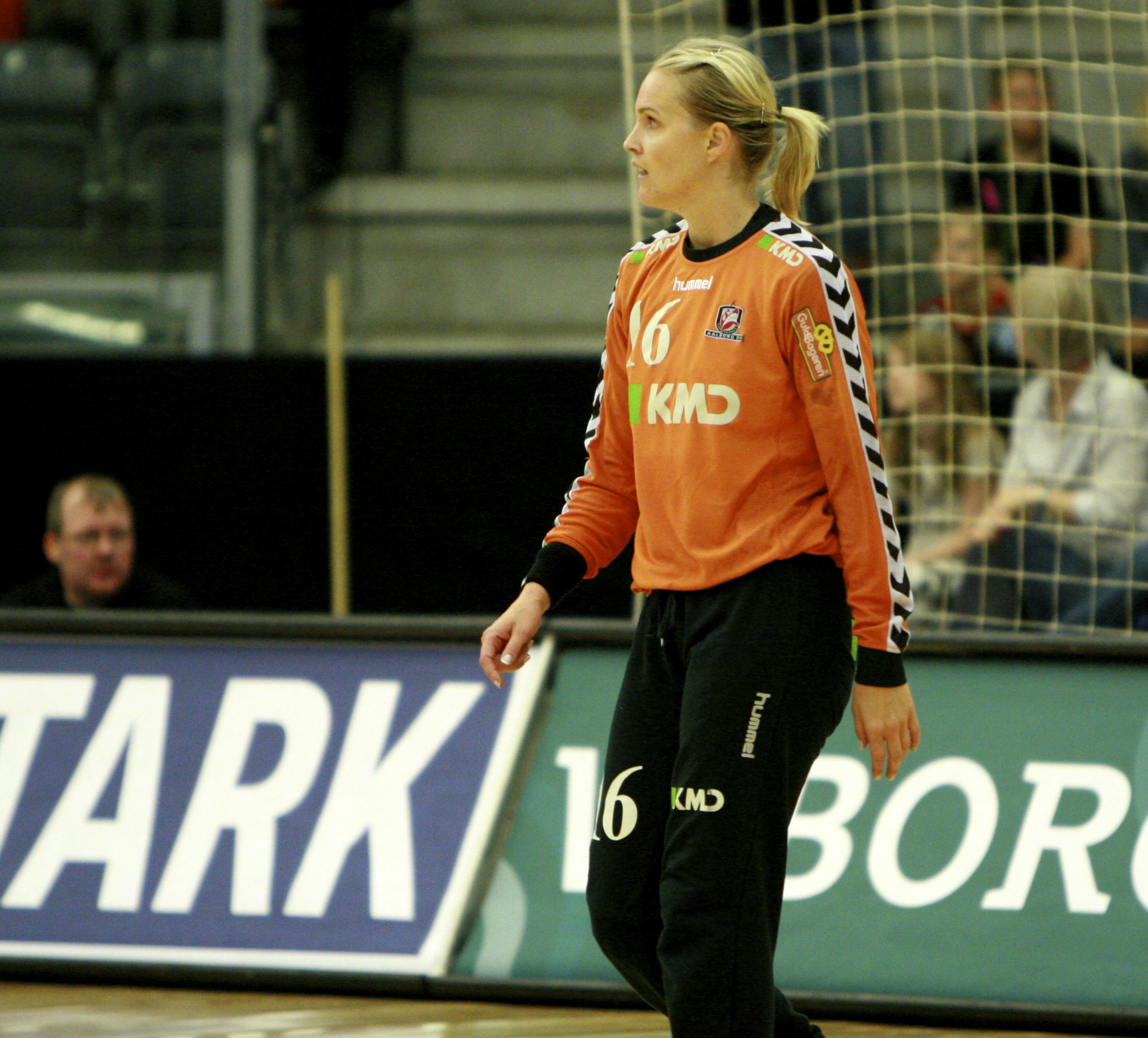
- Madeleine Gustafsson

Personal information
- Full name: Madeleine Gustafsson
- Nationality: Swedish
- Born: 12 August 1980 (age 46) Eskilstuna, Sweden
- Height: 1.82 m (6 ft 0 in)

Sport
- Sport: Handball
- Position: Goalkeeper
- Current club: Retired

Senior clubs
- Years: Team
- –: Skånela IF
- –2006: Skövde HF
- 2006–2008: FCK Håndbold (Denmark)
- 2008–2010: Aalborg DH (Denmark)
National team
| Years | Team | Apps | (Gls) |
| 2001–2009 | Sweden | 140 | (0) |
- Updated on 31 December 2017

Madeleine Gustafsson, formerly Madeleine Grundström (born 12 August 1980) is a Swedish former handball goalkeeper who played for the Sweden women's national handball team. She participated at the 2008 Summer Olympics in Beijing, where Sweden placed 8th. She was listed among the top ten goalkeepers at the 2008 European Women's Handball Championship in Macedonia.

In September 2009 she was forced to retire due to injury.

She is married to former handball player Mattias Gustafsson.
