= Christina Roslyng =

Danish handball player (born 1978)

Personal information
- Full name: Christina Roslyng Hansen
- Nationality: Danish
- Born: 10 July 1978 (age 48) Juelsminde, Denmark
- Height: 169 cm (67 in)
- Weight: 60 kg (132 lb)

Sport
- Sport: Handball
- Position: Left Wing

Senior clubs
- Years: Team
- 1995–1997: Horsens HK
- 1997–2003: Viborg HK
- 2003–2005: Kolding IF
- 2005–2007: SønderjyskE Håndbold
- 2007–2008: Viborg HK
National team
Years	Team	Apps	(Gls)
1998–2004	Denmark	129	(299)

Teams managed
- 2016–2019: Klakring IF
- 2019–2023: Denmark Women's Team Team leader
Medal record
Women's handball
Representing Denmark
Olympic Games
Gold medal – first place	2000 Sydney	Team
European Championship
Gold medal – first place	2002 Denmark	Team competition
Silver medal – second place	1998 Netherlands	Team competition

Christina Roslyng Christiansen (née Roslyng Hansen, born 10 July 1978) is a Danish former team handball player. She is an Olympic champion and European champion. She received a gold medal with the Danish national team at the 2000 Summer Olympics in Sydney and the 2002 European Championship.

She was included in the European Handball Federation Hall of Fame in 2023.

== Career ==
Roslyng started playing handball at the age of 11 and moved to Horsens HK in 1995.

At the age of 19 in 1997 she joined Viborg HK. Shere she won four Danish Championships and the 1999 EHF European League.

She then joined first Kolding KIF and them SønderjyskE Håndbold, before returning to Viborg for a single year, where she won her fifth Danish Championship.

== Post-playing career ==
She has been the coach at Klakring IF, an amateur club from Klakring, a small town near Juelsminde in central Jutland.

From 2019 to 2023 Roslyng was part of the staff around the Danish Women's national team.

== Personal life ==
She is married to handballer Lars Christiansen. Together, they have two sons, Frederik and August. They split up in 2009, however, as of 2012, they are back together.

In 2006, she won the Danish version of Dancing With the Stars, Vild med dans, with the partner Steen Lund.
