= Karin Mortensen =

Danish handball player (born 1977)

Personal information
- Nationality: Danish
- Born: 26 September 1977 (age 49) Horsens, Denmark
- Height: 1.81 m (5 ft 11 in)

Sport
- Sport: Handball
- Position: Goalkeeper
- Current club: Retired

Youth career
- Years: Team
- –: Vejlby-Risskov

Senior clubs
- Years: Team
- 1998-2002: Horsens HK
- 2002-2006: Ikast/Bording EH
- 2006-2010: SK Aarhus
- 2010-2013: FIF
National team
Years	Team	Apps	(Gls)
2000-2012	Denmark	233	(4)
Medal record
Representing Denmark
Olympic Games
Gold medal – first place	2000 Sydney	Team
Gold medal – first place	2004 Athens	Team
European Championship
Gold medal – first place	2002 Denmark	Team
Silver medal – second place	2004 Hungary	Team

Karin Ørnhøj Mortensen (born 26 September 1977) is a Danish former team handball player and two times Olympic champion.

== National team ==
She received gold medals with the Danish national team at the 2000 Summer Olympics in Sydney and at the 2004 Summer Olympics in Athens, Denmark beat South Korea in a penalty shoot out. Mortensen was Denmark's chosen keeper for the shoot-out and managed to save 2 out of 4 attempts.

She also won a gold medal at the 2002 European Women's Handball Championship where she was awarded the MVP award for the tournament.

She retired from the national team in September 2012 after the 2012 Olympics. Having played 233 matches, she is the second most tenured player on the Danish Women's national team (second to Janne Kolling with 250 matches), and the most matches as Goalkeeper.

== Club career ==
Mortensen started at VRI. She later joined Horsens HK, followed by Ikast/Bording EH in 2002. Here she reached the final of the Danish League in 2003, where they lost to Slagelse DT.

In 2006 she left Ikast-Bording for SK Aarhus. In 2010 she joined Frederiksberg IF. After the 2012-13 season she retired.

== Post-playing career ==
During her handball career, she educated herself as a physiotherapist and today she has a clinic in Copenhagen. Additionally, she has worked sporadically as a handball expert on Danish television.

She hass also worked as a handball expert at Danmarks Radio.
