= Marianne Bonde =

Danish handball player (born 1984)

Marianne Bonde Pedersen
Personal information
- Nationality: Danish
- Born: 25 June 1984 (age 42) Skjern, Denmark
- Height: 1.84 m (6 ft 0 in)

Sport
- Sport: Handball
- Position: Pivot

Youth career
- Years: Team
- –: Borris GUF
- 2002-2005: Skjern Håndbold

Senior clubs
- Years: Team
- 2005–2007: Horsens HK
- 2007: GOG Svendborg TGI
- 2007–2008: Slagelse DT
- 2008–2010: FCK Håndbold
- 2010–2013: FIF
- 2013–2015: København Håndbold
- 2017: Odense Håndbold
National team
Years	Team	Apps	(Gls)
2008–2014	Denmark	58	(50)
Medal record
World Championship
Bronze medal – third place	2013 Serbia	Team
- Updated on January 2024

Marianne Bonde Pedersen (born 25 June 1984) is a Danish retired handball player who has played for teams such as Slagelse DT and FCK Håndbold as well as for the Danish national team. Among other tournaments, Bonde competed at the 2012 Summer Olympics and the 2013 World Championships where the Danish national team came in third. Bonde originally retired after the 2014–15 season but came out of retirement in 2017 to help Odense Håndbold who were suffering from multiple injuries and pregnancies.
