= Cruciate ligament injury =

Cruciate ligament injury may refer to:

- Anterior cruciate ligament injury
- Posterior cruciate ligament injury
- Tear of the cruciate ligament of atlas

== See also ==
- Unhappy triad
