= Anja Byrial Hansen =

Danish handball player (born 1973)

Personal information
- Nationality: Danish
- Born: 1 November 1973 (age 53) Horsens, Denmark

Sport
- Sport: Handball
- Position: Line Player

Youth career
- Years: Team
- –: Horsens Boldklub
- –: Horsens Håndboldklub

Senior clubs
- Years: Team
- 1991: Ikast fS
- 1992: Horsens Håndboldklub
- 1993–1995: Ikast fS
- 1995–1996: DHG
- 1996: GOG Håndbold
National team
Years	Team	Apps	(Gls)
1992–1996	Denmark	88	(112)
Medal record
Women's handball
Representing Denmark
Olympic Games
Gold medal – first place	1996 Atlanta	Team competition
World Championships
Silver medal – second place	1993 Norway
Bronze medal – third place	1995 Austria and Hungary
European Championship
Gold medal – first place	1994 Germany	Team
Gold medal – first place	1996 Denmark	Team

Anja Byrial Hansen (born 1 November 1973 in Horsens, Midtjylland) is a Danish former team handball player and Olympic champion. She won a gold medal with the Danish national team at the 1996 Summer Olympics in Atlanta. She also won European Championship twice, in 1994 and 1996.

She ended her career prematurely at the age of 23 in order to move to Great Britain with her at the time partner, the football player, Per Pedersen. A decision she has later admitted to regret.

After her playing career, she has been U-19 coach for Virum-Sorgenfri HK.

Anja has four kids; Oliver, Nikoline, Victoria, and Tobias and now lives in Copenhagen.
