= Mette Sjøberg =

Danish handball player (born 1982)

Personal information
- Full name: Mette Sjøberg Kroman
- Nationality: Danish
- Born: 19 April 1982 (age 44) Vejle, Denmark
- Height: 178 cm (70 in)

Sport
- Sport: Handball
- Position: left back

Senior clubs
- Years: Team
- -2002: GOG Svendborg TGI
- 2002-2006: Horsens HK
- 2006-2008: FCK Håndbold
- 2008-2010: FCM Håndbold
National team
Years	Team	Apps	(Gls)
2003-2008	Denmark	85	(262)
Medal record
Silver medal – second place	2004 Hungary	Team

Mette Sjøberg (born 19 April 1982) is a Danish former handball player. She played her entire career in Denmark for the clubs KIF Vejen, GOG, Horsens HK, FCK Håndbold and FC Midtjylland Håndbold. Hun debuted for the Denmark women's national handball team on the 14th of June 2003. She won silver medals with Danish National team in the 2004 European Women's Handball Championship.

In 2006 she switched from Horsens HK to FCK Håndbold, where she played during the 2006/07 season, scoring 167 goals in the Danish Handball League. This was enough to make her the top scorer in the Danish league. In the summer of 2008 Sjøberg left FCK to play two seasons at FC Midtjylland Håndbold.

She retired in 2010 at the age of 28, after a shoulder injury meant she did not have her contract extended at FCM. She then joined the 3rd Division team Vejle HK.

After her playing career she has worked as a teacher in Vejle.
