= HH Elite =

Danish handball club

- Full name: Horsens Håndboldklub Elite
- Short name: HH Elite
- Founded: 1985; 41 years ago
- Arena: Forum Horsens
- Capacity: 4,000
- President: Jørgen Møller
- Head coach: Jakob Larsen
- League: Damehåndboldligaen
- 2024–25: 8th
- Club colours
Home	Away

Location of Horsens HK

Horsens Håndboldklub Elite, also known as Horsens Håndboldklub, is a Danish handball club. For the 2018/19 season, the team was promoted to the Damehåndboldligaen, after its relegation in 2010. The team plays at home in Forum Horsens. At elite level the team goes by HH Elite, while at amateur and youth levels, the team is called by their original name, Horsens Håndboldklub.

== History ==
The club was established in 1985 when Horsens forenede Håndboldklubber (HfH) and Dagnæs IF chose to merge. They decided to merge, as HfH only had a senior level team, while Dagnæs IF had good youth teams, but no senior team at a competitive level. HfH itself is a merger of Horsens Freja and Horsens forenede Sportsklubber (HfS). Horsens HK therefore can trace its roots back to 1920 when they began playing handball in HfS. Horsens HK played in the top level uninterrupted from 1996 to 2010. Just before the 2011/2012 HH Elite were relegated administratively due to not paying the participants' fee for the Danish 1st Division in time.

In 2019 they were once again promoted to the Damehåndboldligaen, led by head coach Henrik Okkerstrøm.

National team players like Vivi Kjærsgaard, Gitte Madsen, Anja Byrial Hansen, Karen Brødsgaard, Christina Roslyng, Louise Pedersen, Karin Mortensen, Tine Ladefoged, Mette Sjøberg and Jane Wangsøe Knudsen have played in Horsens HK.

== Kits ==
Home
2019-2020	2020-

== Team ==
=== Current squad ===
Squad for the 2026-27 season

Goalkeeper

- 1 (Denmark) Mathilde Bisgaard
- 12 (Denmark) Zenia Hald Madsen

LW

- 4 (Denmark) Andrea Bjertrup Jensen
- 33 (Denmark) Laura Holm Andersen

RW

- 13 (Denmark) Cecillie Wiking Antivakis
- 22 (Denmark) Sille Cecilie Sorth

Pivots

- 3 (Sweden) Alma Skretting
- 9 (Iceland) Katrín Tinna Jensdóttir
- 18 (Denmark) Sidsel Poulsen

Back players
LB

- 6 (Denmark) Thea Hamann Rasmussen
- 10 (Denmark) Smilla Hede
- 88 (Denmark) Mathilde Neesgaard

CB

- 5 (Denmark) Tea Thomassen Hein
- 7 (Denmark) Kirstine Emilie Hoppe
- 20 (Denmark) Ditte Tokkesdal

RB

- 62 (Denmark) Louise Søndergaard

=== Staff ===
Pos.	Name
Head coach	(Greenland) Jakob Larsen
Assistant coach	(Denmark) Ronni Boy
Team leader	(Denmark) Jane Marie Thomsen
Goalkeeping coach	(Hungary) Orsolya Kurucz
Physiotherapist	(Denmark) Minna Poulsen
Chiropractor	(Denmark) Lasse Nørtoft
Chiropractor	(Denmark) Bjarne Keseler
Chiropractor	(Denmark) Søren Amstrup Nielsen
Video man	(Denmark) Keld Jensen

=== Transfers ===
Transfers for the season 2026-27

Joining

- (Denmark) Zenia Hald Madsen (GK) (from own youth)
- (Denmark) Andrea Bjertrup Jensen (LW) (from own youth)
- (Denmark) Kirstine Emilie Hoppe (CB) (from own youth)
- (Denmark) Louise Søndergaard (RB) (from (Denmark) Viborg HK)
- (Denmark) Cecillie Wiking Antivakis (RW) (from own youth)
- (Denmark) Sidsel Poulsen (P) (from (Denmark) Bjerringbro FH)
- (Iceland) Katrín Jensdóttir (P) (from (Iceland) Íþróttafélag Reykjavíkur)

Leaving

- (Sweden) Nora Persson (GK) (to (Denmark) SønderjyskE)
- (Denmark) Matilde Vestergaard (LW) (to (Denmark) Odense Håndbold)
- (Denmark) Maria Højgaard (LW) (to (Denmark) Ejstrup/Hærvejen)
- (Faroe Islands) Maria Pálsdóttir Nólsoy (LB) (to (Denmark) København Håndbold)
- (Sweden) Emma Wahlström (CB) (to (Denmark) Holstebro Håndbold)
- (Norway) Frida Haug Hoel (RB) (to (Norway) Larvik HK)
- (Sweden) Mathilda Lundström (RW) (to (Sweden) Skara HF)
- (Netherlands) Romée Maarschalkerweerd (P) (to (Denmark) Odense Håndbold)

== Notable former players ==
- (Denmark) Mathilde Bjerregaard (2009-2011)
- (Denmark) Marianne Bonde (2005-2006)
- (Denmark) Karen Brødsgaard (1997-1998)
- (Denmark) Anja Byrial Hansen (1991-1993)
- (Denmark) Camilla Fangel (2010-2011)
- (Denmark) Annette Jensen (2010-2011)
- (Denmark) Vivi Kjærsgaard (1987-1992)
- (Denmark) Tine Ladefoged (1998-2010)
- (Denmark) Pernille Larsen (2004-2007)
- (Denmark) Kristina Jørgensen (2004-2014)
- (Denmark) Karin Mortensen (2000-2002)
- (Denmark) Ann Grete Nørgaard (2009-2010)
- (Denmark) Mette Sjøberg (2002-2005)
- (Denmark) Louise Pedersen (1998-2001)
- (Denmark) Jane Wangsøe (2000-2008)
- (Denmark) Christina Roslyng (1995-1997)
- (Sweden) Annika Fredén (2005-2010)
- (Sweden) Sara Holmgren (2001–2005)
- (Sweden) Åsa Eriksson (2005-2007)
- (Iceland) Arna Sif Pálsdóttir (2009-2010)
- (Netherlands) Maura Visser (2007-2009)
- (Norway) Jeanette Nilsen (2003-2007)
- (Norway) Emily Stang Sando (2021–2024)
- (Norway) Hege Løken (2022–2024)
- (Norway) Andrea Austmo Pedersen (2024–2025)
- (Hungary) Olga Hoffmann (2007-2011)
- (Hungary) Beatrix Benyáts (2008-2010)
- (Slovakia) Katarína Dubajová (2006-2009)
- (Brazil) Mayssa Pessoa (2023-2024)
- (Sweden) Elin Hansson (2023-2024)

== Former chairpersons ==
- 1985 - 1987 Niels Bjørn Andreasen
- 1986 - 1993 Michael Bach Jensen
- 1993 - 1995 Arne Jørgensen
- 1995 - 1999 Kai-Aage L. Petersen
- 1999 - 1999 Peter Troelsen
- 1999 - 2004 Carsten Fynbo Larsen
- 2004 - 2010 Claus Cramer
- 2010 - 2011 Kurt Hjortshøj
- 2011 - 2012 Lars Vestergaard
- 2012 - 2016 Jes Boesen
- 2016 - 2018 Jan Vang Østergaard
- 2018 - Michael Brock

== European games ==
In 2004/05 they were eliminated in the quarterfinals of the EHF Cup after having eliminated three other teams in the previous rounds. One of these were the league rivals Randers HK.

After the winning the Danish Handball Cup in 2004 they participated in the EHF Cup Winners' Cup in 2005/06, where they were eliminated in the 4th round.

== Arena ==
- Name: Forum Horsens
- Capacity: 4,000
- City: Horsens
- Address: Langmarksvej 53, 8700 Horsens

== Kit manufacturers ==
- (Denmark) Hummel
