= Louise Pedersen =

Danish handball player (born 1979)

Personal information
- Nationality: Danish
- Born: 19 January 1979 (age 47) Odder, Denmark
- Height: 189 cm (74 in)

Sport
- Sport: Handball
- Position: Right Wing

Senior clubs
- Years: Team
- 1998–2001: Horsens HK
- 2001–2003: Viborg HK
- 2003–2004: Kolding IF
- 2004–2007: Aalborg DH
- 2007–2009: Slagelse DT
- 2009–2010: Odense GOG
- 2010–2013: Våg Vipers (Norway)
National team
| Years | Team | Apps | (Gls) |
| 1999–2010 | Denmark | 59 | (110) |

Teams managed
- 2013–2014: Våg Vipers (Norway)
- 2014–2015: Randesund IL (Norway)

Louise Pedersen (born 19 January 1979) is a Danish retired handball player and handball coach who last played for Vipers Kristiansand, where she also started her coaching career.

She has previously played in Odder, in Århus KFUM, Horsens HK, Viborg HK, Kolding IF, Aalborg DH and Odense GOG. She also played on the Danish national team. She has participated in both European Championships and World Championships. In 2001/02 she won a Danish championship with Viborg HK.

She retired from the national team in 2007 after it became clear that Denmark would not qualify for the 2007 World Cup, but she made a comeback in 2009.
