= Lærke Møller =

Danish handball player (born 1989)

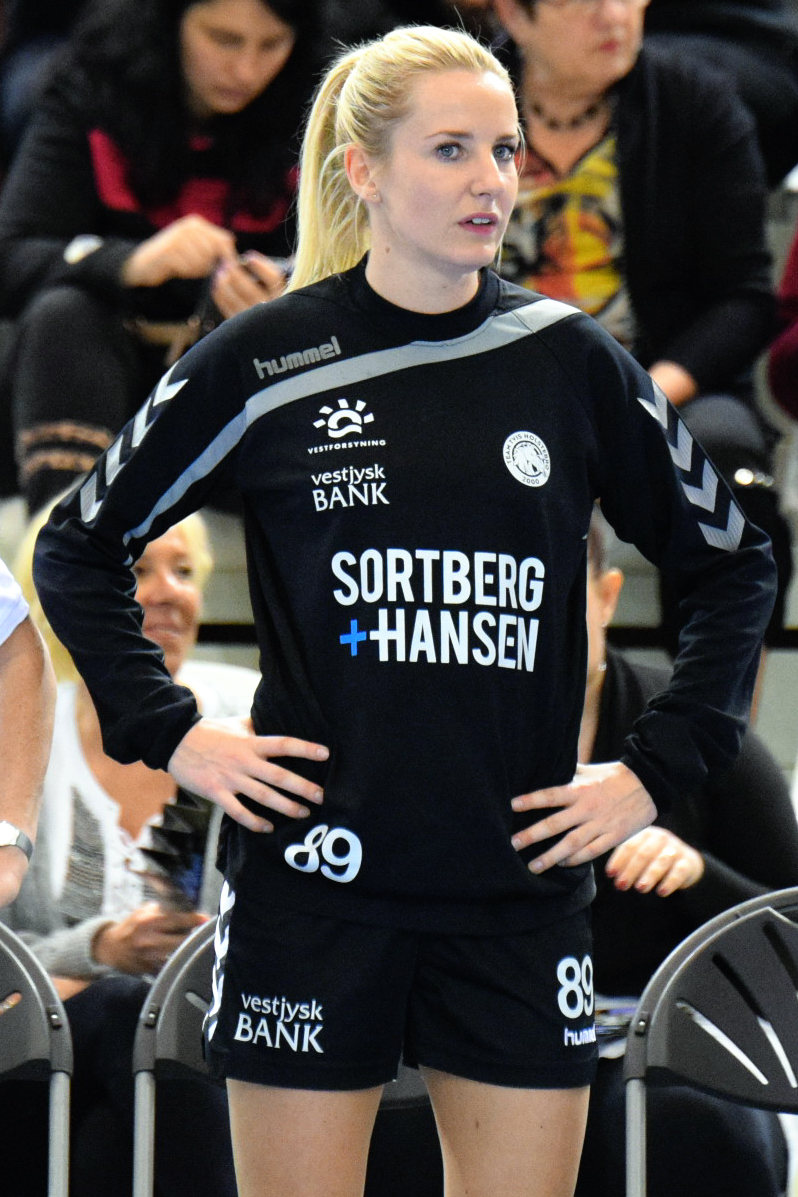
- Møller in 2016

Personal information
- Full name: Lærke Winther Møller
- Nationality: Danish
- Born: 14 January 1989 (age 37) Aalborg, Denmark
- Height: 1.71 m (5 ft 7 in)

Sport
- Sport: Handball
- Position: Centre back

Youth career
- Years: Team
- –: HK Star
- –: Visse IF

Senior clubs
- Years: Team
- 2005–2009: Aalborg DH
- 2009–2014: FCM Håndbold
- 2014–2016: Team Tvis Holstebro
- 2016–2018: Team Esbjerg
National team
Years	Team	Apps	(Gls)
2008–2015	Denmark	51	(139)
Medal record
IHF Junior World Championship
Silver medal – second place	2008 Macedonia
IHF Youth World Championship
Gold medal – first place	2006 Canada
European Junior Championship
Gold medal – first place	2007 Turkey

Lærke Møller (born 14 January 1989) is a Danish former handball player, who last played for the club Team Esbjerg and for the Danish women's national handball team.

She has worked as a handball expert on the Danish TV-channel TV 2.

== Career ==
Lærke Møller started playing at a hometown club HK Star at age 7. During childhood she also played for Visse IF, before joining Aalborg DH. At the age of 16 she debuted for the senior team in a Champion League match. Shortly after she signed her first professional contract. She was a part of the Aalborg league team until she was 20, where she switched to FC Midtjylland Håndbold. Here she won two Danish championships in 2011 and 2013 and the Danish cup in 2012.

After 5 years she joined league rivals TTH Holstebro. After 2 seasons she joined Team Esbjerg. She retired in 2018 after two years at Team Esbjerg, but without ever playing a match for them due to injuries.

Lærke Møller debuted for the Danish national team in 2007, aged 18. At the 2008 European Women's Handball Championship she was the Danish top scorer at the tournament with 28 goals, and was widely praised as the best performing dane in the Danish press.

She missed the 2009 World Women's Handball Championship due to a torn achilles tendon at training the day before the start of the tournament. She also missed the 2011 World Women's Handball Championship due to a shoulder injury.

At the 2010 European Women's Handball Championship she reached the third place playoff with the Danish team, where they lost to Romania and thus finished fourth.

== Private life ==
She is in a relationship with the Danish football player Thomas Enevoldsen, with whom she has a child.

== Achievements ==
- Damehåndboldligaen:
  - Winner: 2011, 2013
  - Silver Medalist: 2009, 2014
  - Bronze Medalist: 2006, 2007, 2012
- DHF Landspokalturneringen:
  - Winner: 2012
- EHF Cup:
  - Winner: 2011
  - Semifinalist: 2013
