= 2004 European Women's Handball Championship =

2004 EHF European Women's Handball Championship

Tournament details
- Host country: Hungary
- Venues: 5 (in 5 host cities)
- Dates: 9–19 December
- Teams: 16 (from 1 confederation)

Final positions
- Champions: Norway (2nd title)
- Runners-up: Denmark
- Third place: Hungary
- Fourth place: Russia

Tournament statistics
- Matches played: 48
- Goals scored: 2,596 (54.08 per match)
- Top scorer: Bojana Radulović (HUN) (72 goals)

Awards
- Best player: Gro Hammerseng (NOR)

The 2004 EHF European Women's Handball Championship was held in Hungary from 9–19 December, it was won by Norway after beating Denmark 27–25 in the final match.

== Venues ==
The 2004 European Championship was held in the following cities:

- Debrecen (Preliminary Group A, Main Group 2)
- Zalaegerszeg (Preliminary Group B)
- Békéscsaba (Preliminary Group C)
- Győr (Preliminary Group D, Main Group 1)
- Budapest (Final Round)

== Qualification ==
Country	Qualified as	Previous appearances in tournament^{1}
Hungary	Host	5 (1994, 1996, 1998, **2000**, 2002)
Denmark	Semifinalist of 2002 European Championship	5 (**1994**, **1996**, 1998, 2000, **2002**)
Norway	Semifinalist of 2002 European Championship	5 (1994, 1996, **1998**, 2000, 2002)
France	Semifinalist of 2002 European Championship	2 (2000, 2002)
Russia	Semifinalist of 2002 European Championship	5 (1994, 1996, 1998, 2000, 2002)
Austria	Playoff winner	5 (1994, 1996, 1998, 2000, 2002)
Belarus	Playoff winner	2 (2000, 2002)
Croatia	Playoff winner	2 (1994, 1996)
Czech Republic	Playoff winner	2 (1994, 2002)
Germany	Playoff winner	5 (1994, 1996, 1998, 2000, 2002)
Romania	Playoff winner	5 (1994, 1996, 1998, 2000, 2002)
Serbia and Montenegro	Playoff winner	2^{2} (2000, 2002)
Slovenia	Playoff winner	1 (2002)
Spain	Playoff winner	2 (1998, 2002)
Sweden	Playoff winner	3 (1994, 1996, 2002)
Ukraine	Playoff winner	5 (1994, 1996, 1998, 2000, 2002)

^{1} Bold indicates champion for that year. Italic indicates host for that year.
^{2} as FR Yugoslavia

== Competition format ==
- Preliminary Round: 16 teams are divided into four groups. They play each other in a single round robin system, so each team plays three matches. A win is worth two points, while a draw is worth one point. The top three teams from each group advance to the Main Round.
- Main Round: 12 teams are divided in two groups. They play against the teams they didn't play in the Preliminary Round, so each team plays 3 matches. All points from the Preliminary Round, except the points gained against the 4th place team in the preliminary group, are carried forward into the Main Round. Same round robin rules apply as in the Preliminary Round. Top 2 teams from each group advance to the semifinals, while the third placed team from each group advances to the 5th-6th Place Play-off, and the fourth placed team to the 7th-8th Place Play-off.
- Final Round: 8 teams play in the final weekend of the championships. 3rd place teams from the Main Round play in the 5th-6th Place Play-off, and 4th place team to the 7th-8th Place Play-off. Other teams play in the semifinals. Losers of the semifinals advance to the 3rd-4th Place Play-off, and winners advance to the final.

== Preliminary round ==
=== Group A ===
Pos	Team	Pld	W	D	L	GF	GA	GD	Pts	Qualification
1	Norway	3	3	0	0	83	71	+12	6	Main round
2	Ukraine	3	2	0	1	77	74	+3	4	Main round
3	Spain	3	1	0	2	71	72	−1	2	Main round
4	Czech Republic	3	0	0	3	60	74	−14	0	

Source: EHF
Rules for classification: 1) points; 2) head-to-head points; 3) head-to-head goal difference; 4) head-to-head number of goals scored; 5) goal difference.

9 December 2004; 17:00	Czech Republic	18–19	Spain	Főnix Hall, Debrecen; Attendance: 2,500; Referees: Ehrmann, Künzig (GER)
9 December 2004; 17:00		(12–6)		Főnix Hall, Debrecen; Attendance: 2,500; Referees: Ehrmann, Künzig (GER)
9 December 2004; 17:00		Report		Főnix Hall, Debrecen; Attendance: 2,500; Referees: Ehrmann, Künzig (GER)

9 December 2004; 19:10	Norway	27–24	Ukraine	Főnix Hall, Debrecen; Attendance: 2,500; Referees: Kékes, Kékes (HUN)
9 December 2004; 19:10		(15–12)		Főnix Hall, Debrecen; Attendance: 2,500; Referees: Kékes, Kékes (HUN)
9 December 2004; 19:10		Report		Főnix Hall, Debrecen; Attendance: 2,500; Referees: Kékes, Kékes (HUN)

11 December 2004; 17:00	Ukraine	25–20	Czech Republic	Főnix Hall, Debrecen; Attendance: 2,500; Referees: Küçükyılmaz, Altan (TUR)
11 December 2004; 17:00		(13–8)		Főnix Hall, Debrecen; Attendance: 2,500; Referees: Küçükyılmaz, Altan (TUR)
11 December 2004; 17:00		Report		Főnix Hall, Debrecen; Attendance: 2,500; Referees: Küçükyılmaz, Altan (TUR)

11 December 2004; 19:10	Spain	25–26	Norway	Főnix Hall, Debrecen; Attendance: 2,600; Referees: Nachevski, Nachevski (MKD)
11 December 2004; 19:10		(11–14)		Főnix Hall, Debrecen; Attendance: 2,600; Referees: Nachevski, Nachevski (MKD)
11 December 2004; 19:10		Report		Főnix Hall, Debrecen; Attendance: 2,600; Referees: Nachevski, Nachevski (MKD)

12 December 2004; 17:00	Ukraine	28–27	Spain	Főnix Hall, Debrecen; Attendance: 1,000; Referees: Olesen, Pedersen (DEN)
12 December 2004; 17:00		(13–16)		Főnix Hall, Debrecen; Attendance: 1,000; Referees: Olesen, Pedersen (DEN)
12 December 2004; 17:00		Report		Főnix Hall, Debrecen; Attendance: 1,000; Referees: Olesen, Pedersen (DEN)

12 December 2004; 19:10	Norway	30–22	Czech Republic	Főnix Hall, Debrecen; Attendance: 2,500; Referees: Van der Helm, Wiebrands (NED)
12 December 2004; 19:10		(16–10)		Főnix Hall, Debrecen; Attendance: 2,500; Referees: Van der Helm, Wiebrands (NED)
12 December 2004; 19:10		Report		Főnix Hall, Debrecen; Attendance: 2,500; Referees: Van der Helm, Wiebrands (NED)

=== Group B ===
Pos	Team	Pld	W	D	L	GF	GA	GD	Pts	Qualification
1	Slovenia	3	2	0	1	96	86	+10	4 (Note: Russia 30–31 Slovenia)	Main round
2	Russia	3	2	0	1	95	82	+13	4	Main round
3	Serbia and Montenegro	3	1	0	2	89	105	−16	2 (Note: Serbia and Montenegro 34–30 Croatia)	Main round
4	Croatia	3	1	0	2	82	89	−7	2	

Source: EHF
Rules for classification: 1) points; 2) head-to-head points; 3) head-to-head goal difference; 4) head-to-head number of goals scored; 5) goal difference.
Notes:

9 December 2004; 18:00	Russia	30–31	Slovenia	Zalaegerszeg; Attendance: 1,300; Referees: Rančík, Beňo (SVK)
9 December 2004; 18:00	Turey 6	(12–17)	Derepasko 9	Zalaegerszeg; Attendance: 1,300; Referees: Rančík, Beňo (SVK)
9 December 2004; 18:00	2× (yellow card) 5× (suspension)	Report	3× (yellow card) 4× (suspension)	Zalaegerszeg; Attendance: 1,300; Referees: Rančík, Beňo (SVK)

9 December 2004; 20:00	Serbia and Montenegro	34–30	Croatia	Zalaegerszeg; Attendance: 1,100; Referees: Olesen, Pedersen (DEN)
9 December 2004; 20:00		(17–16)		Zalaegerszeg; Attendance: 1,100; Referees: Olesen, Pedersen (DEN)
9 December 2004; 20:00		Report		Zalaegerszeg; Attendance: 1,100; Referees: Olesen, Pedersen (DEN)

11 December 2004; 18:00	Croatia	22–26	Russia	Zalaegerszeg; Attendance: 1,200; Referees: Ehrmann, Künzig (GER)
11 December 2004; 18:00	Horvat 7	(10–15)	Shipilova 5	Zalaegerszeg; Attendance: 1,200; Referees: Ehrmann, Künzig (GER)
11 December 2004; 18:00	4× (yellow card) 5× (suspension)	Report	3× (yellow card) 6× (suspension)	Zalaegerszeg; Attendance: 1,200; Referees: Ehrmann, Künzig (GER)

11 December 2004; 20:00	Slovenia	36–26	Serbia and Montenegro	Zalaegerszeg; Attendance: 2,000; Referees: Kékes, Kékes (HUN)
11 December 2004; 20:00		(17–9)		Zalaegerszeg; Attendance: 2,000; Referees: Kékes, Kékes (HUN)
11 December 2004; 20:00		Report		Zalaegerszeg; Attendance: 2,000; Referees: Kékes, Kékes (HUN)

12 December 2004; 18:00	Russia	39–29	Serbia and Montenegro	Zalaegerszeg; Attendance: 1,000; Referees: Sołodko, Sołodko (POL)
12 December 2004; 18:00	Bodniyeva 9	(18–13)	Batinić 7	Zalaegerszeg; Attendance: 1,000; Referees: Sołodko, Sołodko (POL)
12 December 2004; 18:00	3× (yellow card) 6× (suspension)	Report	3× (yellow card) 6× (suspension)	Zalaegerszeg; Attendance: 1,000; Referees: Sołodko, Sołodko (POL)

12 December 2004; 20:00	Slovenia	29–30	Croatia	Zalaegerszeg; Attendance: 1,000; Referees: Liachovičius, Paškevičius (LTU)
12 December 2004; 20:00		(16–17)		Zalaegerszeg; Attendance: 1,000; Referees: Liachovičius, Paškevičius (LTU)
12 December 2004; 20:00		Report		Zalaegerszeg; Attendance: 1,000; Referees: Liachovičius, Paškevičius (LTU)

=== Group C ===
Pos	Team	Pld	W	D	L	GF	GA	GD	Pts	Qualification
1	Denmark	3	2	0	1	75	70	+5	4 (Note: Denmark 2 Pts, +2 GD; Germany 2 Pts, –1 GD, 50 GS; Romania 2 Pts, –1 GD, 49 GS)	Main round
2	Germany	3	2	0	1	75	73	+2	4	Main round
3	Romania	3	2	0	1	81	75	+6	4	Main round
4	Sweden	3	0	0	3	68	81	−13	0	

Source: EHF
Rules for classification: 1) points; 2) head-to-head points; 3) head-to-head goal difference; 4) head-to-head number of goals scored; 5) goal difference.
Notes:

9 December 2004; 18:00	Romania	32–25	Sweden	Városi Sportcsarnok, Békéscsaba; Attendance: 2,000; Referees: Küçükyılmaz, Altan (TUR)
9 December 2004; 18:00		(16–10)		Városi Sportcsarnok, Békéscsaba; Attendance: 2,000; Referees: Küçükyılmaz, Altan (TUR)
9 December 2004; 18:00		Report		Városi Sportcsarnok, Békéscsaba; Attendance: 2,000; Referees: Küçükyılmaz, Altan (TUR)

9 December 2004; 20:15	Denmark	27–24	Germany	Városi Sportcsarnok, Békéscsaba; Attendance: 2,100; Referees: Krstić, Ljubič (SLO)
9 December 2004; 20:15		(12–14)		Városi Sportcsarnok, Békéscsaba; Attendance: 2,100; Referees: Krstić, Ljubič (SLO)
9 December 2004; 20:15		Report		Városi Sportcsarnok, Békéscsaba; Attendance: 2,100; Referees: Krstić, Ljubič (SLO)

10 December 2004; 18:00	Germany	26–24	Romania	Városi Sportcsarnok, Békéscsaba; Attendance: 2,000; Referees: Sołodko, Sołodko (POL)
10 December 2004; 18:00		(12–14)		Városi Sportcsarnok, Békéscsaba; Attendance: 2,000; Referees: Sołodko, Sołodko (POL)
10 December 2004; 18:00		Report		Városi Sportcsarnok, Békéscsaba; Attendance: 2,000; Referees: Sołodko, Sołodko (POL)

10 December 2004; 20:15	Sweden	21–24	Denmark	Városi Sportcsarnok, Békéscsaba; Attendance: 2,000; Referees: Hansen, Pettersen (NOR)
10 December 2004; 20:15		(9–11)		Városi Sportcsarnok, Békéscsaba; Attendance: 2,000; Referees: Hansen, Pettersen (NOR)
10 December 2004; 20:15		Report		Városi Sportcsarnok, Békéscsaba; Attendance: 2,000; Referees: Hansen, Pettersen (NOR)

12 December 2004; 18:15	Denmark	24–25	Romania	Városi Sportcsarnok, Békéscsaba; Attendance: 2,000; Referees: Poladenko, Chernega (RUS)
12 December 2004; 18:15		(11–12)		Városi Sportcsarnok, Békéscsaba; Attendance: 2,000; Referees: Poladenko, Chernega (RUS)
12 December 2004; 18:15		Report		Városi Sportcsarnok, Békéscsaba; Attendance: 2,000; Referees: Poladenko, Chernega (RUS)

12 December 2004; 20:15	Germany	25–22	Sweden	Városi Sportcsarnok, Békéscsaba; Attendance: 1,700; Referees: Rančík, Beňo (SVK)
12 December 2004; 20:15		(10–11)		Városi Sportcsarnok, Békéscsaba; Attendance: 1,700; Referees: Rančík, Beňo (SVK)
12 December 2004; 20:15		Report		Városi Sportcsarnok, Békéscsaba; Attendance: 1,700; Referees: Rančík, Beňo (SVK)

=== Group D ===
Pos	Team	Pld	W	D	L	GF	GA	GD	Pts	Qualification
1	Hungary (H)	3	3	0	0	98	74	+24	6	Main round
2	Austria	3	2	0	1	91	84	+7	4	Main round
3	France	3	1	0	2	81	95	−14	2	Main round
4	Belarus	3	0	0	3	70	87	−17	0	

Source: EHF
Rules for classification: 1) points; 2) head-to-head points; 3) head-to-head goal difference; 4) head-to-head number of goals scored; 5) goal difference.
(H) Hosts

9 December 2004; 17:45	Hungary	32–22	Belarus	University Hall, Győr; Attendance: 2,000; Referees: Van der Helm, Wiebrands (NED)
9 December 2004; 17:45		(17–7)		University Hall, Győr; Attendance: 2,000; Referees: Van der Helm, Wiebrands (NED)
9 December 2004; 17:45		Report		University Hall, Győr; Attendance: 2,000; Referees: Van der Helm, Wiebrands (NED)

9 December 2004; 20:00	France	29–36	Austria	University Hall, Győr; Attendance: 1,000; Referees: Nachevski, Nachevski (MKD)
9 December 2004; 20:00		(11–17)		University Hall, Győr; Attendance: 1,000; Referees: Nachevski, Nachevski (MKD)
9 December 2004; 20:00		Report		University Hall, Győr; Attendance: 1,000; Referees: Nachevski, Nachevski (MKD)

10 December 2004; 17:45	Austria	29–34	Hungary	University Hall, Győr; Attendance: 3,500; Referees: Poladenko, Chernega (RUS)
10 December 2004; 17:45		(15–17)		University Hall, Győr; Attendance: 3,500; Referees: Poladenko, Chernega (RUS)
10 December 2004; 17:45		Report		University Hall, Győr; Attendance: 3,500; Referees: Poladenko, Chernega (RUS)

10 December 2004; 20:00	Belarus	27–29	France	University Hall, Győr; Attendance: 2,000; Referees: Liachovičius, Paškevičius (LTU)
10 December 2004; 20:00		(14–15)		University Hall, Győr; Attendance: 2,000; Referees: Liachovičius, Paškevičius (LTU)
10 December 2004; 20:00		Report		University Hall, Győr; Attendance: 2,000; Referees: Liachovičius, Paškevičius (LTU)

12 December 2004; 17:00	France	23–32	Hungary	University Hall, Győr; Attendance: 3,500; Referees: Hansen, Pettersen (NOR)
12 December 2004; 17:00		(12–14)		University Hall, Győr; Attendance: 3,500; Referees: Hansen, Pettersen (NOR)
12 December 2004; 17:00		Report		University Hall, Győr; Attendance: 3,500; Referees: Hansen, Pettersen (NOR)

12 December 2004; 19:00	Austria	26–21	Belarus	University Hall, Győr; Attendance: 1,500; Referees: Krstić, Ljubič (SLO)
12 December 2004; 19:00		(12–8)		University Hall, Győr; Attendance: 1,500; Referees: Krstić, Ljubič (SLO)
12 December 2004; 19:00		Report		University Hall, Győr; Attendance: 1,500; Referees: Krstić, Ljubič (SLO)

== Main round ==
=== Group I ===
Pos	Team	Pld	W	D	L	GF	GA	GD	Pts	Qualification
1	Norway	5	5	0	0	158	115	+43	10	Semifinals
2	Russia	5	3	0	2	148	133	+15	6 (Note: Ukraine 24–28 Russia)	Semifinals
3	Ukraine	5	3	0	2	124	127	−3	6	Fifth place game
4	Spain	5	2	0	3	138	138	0	4 (Note: Spain 30–28 Slovenia)	Seventh place game
5	Slovenia	5	2	0	3	135	151	−16	4	
6	Serbia and Montenegro	5	0	0	5	131	170	−39	0	

Source: EHF
Rules for classification: 1) points; 2) head-to-head points; 3) head-to-head goal difference; 4) head-to-head number of goals scored; 5) goal difference.
Notes:

14 December 2004; 15:00	Spain	32–29	Serbia and Montenegro	University Hall, Győr; Attendance: 500; Referees: Ehrmann, Künzig (GER)
14 December 2004; 15:00		(13–17)		University Hall, Győr; Attendance: 500; Referees: Ehrmann, Künzig (GER)
14 December 2004; 15:00		Report		University Hall, Győr; Attendance: 500; Referees: Ehrmann, Künzig (GER)

14 December 2004; 17:00	Ukraine	24–22	Slovenia	University Hall, Győr; Attendance: 1,000; Referees: Kékes, Kékes (HUN)
14 December 2004; 17:00		(8–11)		University Hall, Győr; Attendance: 1,000; Referees: Kékes, Kékes (HUN)
14 December 2004; 17:00		Report		University Hall, Győr; Attendance: 1,000; Referees: Kékes, Kékes (HUN)

14 December 2004; 19:10	Norway	25–24	Russia	University Hall, Győr; Attendance: 1,300; Referees: Nachevski, Nachevski (MKD)
14 December 2004; 19:10	Riegelhuth 6	(10–9)	Postnova 10	University Hall, Győr; Attendance: 1,300; Referees: Nachevski, Nachevski (MKD)
14 December 2004; 19:10	3× (yellow card) 5× (suspension)	Report	3× (yellow card) 3× (suspension)	University Hall, Győr; Attendance: 1,300; Referees: Nachevski, Nachevski (MKD)

15 December 2004; 15:00	Ukraine	24–28	Russia	University Hall, Győr; Attendance: 1,000; Referees: Sołodko, Sołodko (POL)
15 December 2004; 15:00	Reznir 16	(9–16)	Muravyova, Postnova 6	University Hall, Győr; Attendance: 1,000; Referees: Sołodko, Sołodko (POL)
15 December 2004; 15:00	3× (yellow card) 5× (suspension) 1× (red card)	Report	3× (yellow card) 7× (suspension)	University Hall, Győr; Attendance: 1,000; Referees: Sołodko, Sołodko (POL)

15 December 2004; 17:00	Spain	30–28	Slovenia	University Hall, Győr; Attendance: 1,100; Referees: Nachevski, Nachevski (MKD)
15 December 2004; 17:00		(12–16)		University Hall, Győr; Attendance: 1,100; Referees: Nachevski, Nachevski (MKD)
15 December 2004; 17:00		Report		University Hall, Győr; Attendance: 1,100; Referees: Nachevski, Nachevski (MKD)

15 December 2004; 19:10	Norway	39–24	Serbia and Montenegro	University Hall, Győr; Attendance: 1,000; Referees: Küçükyılmaz, Altan (TUR)
15 December 2004; 19:10		(20–15)		University Hall, Győr; Attendance: 1,000; Referees: Küçükyılmaz, Altan (TUR)
15 December 2004; 19:10		Report		University Hall, Győr; Attendance: 1,000; Referees: Küçükyılmaz, Altan (TUR)

16 December 2004; 15:00	Spain	24–27	Russia	University Hall, Győr; Attendance: 1,500; Referees: Kékes, Kékes (HUN)
16 December 2004; 15:00	Oncina 5	(12–17)	Bodniyeva 9	University Hall, Győr; Attendance: 1,500; Referees: Kékes, Kékes (HUN)
16 December 2004; 15:00	4× (yellow card) 5× (suspension)	Report	2× (yellow card) 8× (suspension) 1× (red card)	University Hall, Győr; Attendance: 1,500; Referees: Kékes, Kékes (HUN)

16 December 2004; 17:00	Ukraine	24–23	Serbia and Montenegro	University Hall, Győr; Attendance: 1,400; Referees: Olesen, Pedersen (DEN)
16 December 2004; 17:00		(15–9)		University Hall, Győr; Attendance: 1,400; Referees: Olesen, Pedersen (DEN)
16 December 2004; 17:00		Report		University Hall, Győr; Attendance: 1,400; Referees: Olesen, Pedersen (DEN)

16 December 2004; 19:10	Norway	41–18	Slovenia	University Hall, Győr; Attendance: 3,500; Referees: Sołodko, Sołodko (POL)
16 December 2004; 19:10		(16–8)		University Hall, Győr; Attendance: 3,500; Referees: Sołodko, Sołodko (POL)
16 December 2004; 19:10		Report		University Hall, Győr; Attendance: 3,500; Referees: Sołodko, Sołodko (POL)

=== Group II ===
Pos	Team	Pld	W	D	L	GF	GA	GD	Pts	Qualification
1	Denmark	5	4	0	1	122	114	+8	8 (Note: Denmark 24–23 Hungary)	Semifinals
2	Hungary (H)	5	4	0	1	146	126	+20	8	Semifinals
3	Germany	5	3	0	2	133	127	+6	6 (Note: Germany 26–24 Romania)	Fifth place game
4	Romania	5	3	0	2	137	134	+3	6	Seventh place game
5	Austria	5	1	0	4	138	149	−11	2	
6	France	5	0	0	5	124	150	−26	0	

Source: EHF
Rules for classification: 1) points; 2) head-to-head points; 3) head-to-head goal difference; 4) head-to-head number of goals scored; 5) goal difference.
(H) Hosts
Notes:

14 December 2004; 15:45	Romania	31–25	France	Főnix Hall, Debrecen; Attendance: 4,000; Referees: Krstić, Ljubič (SLO)
14 December 2004; 15:45		(15–13)		Főnix Hall, Debrecen; Attendance: 4,000; Referees: Krstić, Ljubič (SLO)
14 December 2004; 15:45		Report		Főnix Hall, Debrecen; Attendance: 4,000; Referees: Krstić, Ljubič (SLO)

14 December 2004; 17:45	Germany	25–26	Hungary	Főnix Hall, Debrecen; Attendance: 3,000; Referees: Liachovičius, Paškevičius (LTU)
14 December 2004; 17:45		(13–10)		Főnix Hall, Debrecen; Attendance: 3,000; Referees: Liachovičius, Paškevičius (LTU)
14 December 2004; 17:45		Report		Főnix Hall, Debrecen; Attendance: 3,000; Referees: Liachovičius, Paškevičius (LTU)

14 December 2004; 19:45	Denmark	25–22	Austria	Főnix Hall, Debrecen; Attendance: 3,000; Referees: Rančík, Beňo (SVK)
14 December 2004; 19:45		(16–14)		Főnix Hall, Debrecen; Attendance: 3,000; Referees: Rančík, Beňo (SVK)
14 December 2004; 19:45		Report		Főnix Hall, Debrecen; Attendance: 3,000; Referees: Rančík, Beňo (SVK)

15 December 2004; 15:45	Germany	29–23	Austria	Főnix Hall, Debrecen; Attendance: 1,000; Referees: Hansen, Pettersen (NOR)
15 December 2004; 15:45		(13–13)		Főnix Hall, Debrecen; Attendance: 1,000; Referees: Hansen, Pettersen (NOR)
15 December 2004; 15:45		Report		Főnix Hall, Debrecen; Attendance: 1,000; Referees: Hansen, Pettersen (NOR)

15 December 2004; 17:45	Romania	25–31	Hungary	Főnix Hall, Debrecen; Attendance: 5,000; Referees: Rančík, Beňo (SVK)
15 December 2004; 17:45		(13–17)		Főnix Hall, Debrecen; Attendance: 5,000; Referees: Rančík, Beňo (SVK)
15 December 2004; 17:45		Report		Főnix Hall, Debrecen; Attendance: 5,000; Referees: Rančík, Beňo (SVK)

15 December 2004; 19:45	Denmark	22–20	France	Főnix Hall, Debrecen; Attendance: 1,500; Referees: Van der Helm, Wiebrands (NED)
15 December 2004; 19:45		(10–12)		Főnix Hall, Debrecen; Attendance: 1,500; Referees: Van der Helm, Wiebrands (NED)
15 December 2004; 19:45		Report		Főnix Hall, Debrecen; Attendance: 1,500; Referees: Van der Helm, Wiebrands (NED)

16 December 2004; 15:45	Germany	29–27	France	Főnix Hall, Debrecen; Attendance: 2,000; Referees: Nachevski, Nachevski (MKD)
16 December 2004; 15:45		(13–16)		Főnix Hall, Debrecen; Attendance: 2,000; Referees: Nachevski, Nachevski (MKD)
16 December 2004; 15:45		Report		Főnix Hall, Debrecen; Attendance: 2,000; Referees: Nachevski, Nachevski (MKD)

16 December 2004; 17:45	Denmark	24–23	Hungary	Főnix Hall, Debrecen; Attendance: 7,000; Referees: Krstić, Ljubič (SLO)
16 December 2004; 17:45		(8–14)		Főnix Hall, Debrecen; Attendance: 7,000; Referees: Krstić, Ljubič (SLO)
16 December 2004; 17:45		Report		Főnix Hall, Debrecen; Attendance: 7,000; Referees: Krstić, Ljubič (SLO)

16 December 2004; 19:45	Romania	32–28	Austria	Főnix Hall, Debrecen; Attendance: 3,000; Referees: Poladenko, Chernega (RUS)
16 December 2004; 19:45		(14–15)		Főnix Hall, Debrecen; Attendance: 3,000; Referees: Poladenko, Chernega (RUS)
16 December 2004; 19:45		Report		Főnix Hall, Debrecen; Attendance: 3,000; Referees: Poladenko, Chernega (RUS)

== Final round ==
=== Bracket ===
Semifinals
18 December
Norway	44
Hungary	29
18 December
Russia	27
Denmark	31

Final
19 December
Norway	27
Denmark	25
Third place
19 December
Hungary	29
Russia	25

=== Semifinals ===
18 December 2004; 17:00	Norway	44–29	Hungary	Budapest Sports Arena, Budapest; Attendance: 8,000; Referees: Rančík, Beňo (SVK)
18 December 2004; 17:00	Hårsaker 9	(21–16)	Radulovics 10	Budapest Sports Arena, Budapest; Attendance: 8,000; Referees: Rančík, Beňo (SVK)
18 December 2004; 17:00	3× (yellow card) 3× (suspension)	Report	3× (yellow card) 8× (suspension)	Budapest Sports Arena, Budapest; Attendance: 8,000; Referees: Rančík, Beňo (SVK)

18 December 2004; 19:30	Russia	27–31	Denmark	Budapest Sports Arena, Budapest; Attendance: 3,000; Referees: Krstić, Ljubič (SLO)
18 December 2004; 19:30	Postnova 7	(11–11)	Touray 7	Budapest Sports Arena, Budapest; Attendance: 3,000; Referees: Krstić, Ljubič (SLO)
18 December 2004; 19:30	4× (yellow card) 5× (suspension)	Report	3× (yellow card) 7× (suspension) 1× (red card)	Budapest Sports Arena, Budapest; Attendance: 3,000; Referees: Krstić, Ljubič (SLO)

=== Seventh place game ===
18 December 2004; 14:30	Spain	28–37	Romania	Budapest Sports Arena, Budapest; Attendance: 2,500; Referees: Ehrmann, Künzig (GER)
18 December 2004; 14:30	Ortuño 7	(17–16)	Avadanii 11	Budapest Sports Arena, Budapest; Attendance: 2,500; Referees: Ehrmann, Künzig (GER)
18 December 2004; 14:30	3× (yellow card) 3× (suspension)	Report	2× (yellow card) 3× (suspension)	Budapest Sports Arena, Budapest; Attendance: 2,500; Referees: Ehrmann, Künzig (GER)

=== Fifth place game ===
19 December 2004
12:30
Ukraine
24–25 (ET)
Germany
Budapest Sports Arena, Budapest
Attendance: 3,000
Referees: Kékes, Kékes (HUN)
Lyapina 7
(8–8)
Jurack 9
3× (yellow card) 6× (suspension)
Report
3× (yellow card) 3× (suspension)

FT: 22–22 ET: 2–3

=== Third place game ===
19 December 2004; 15:00	Hungary	29–25	Russia	Budapest Sports Arena, Budapest; Attendance: 10,000; Referees: Hansen, Pettersen (NOR)
19 December 2004; 15:00	Radulovics 12	(14–13)	Turey 7	Budapest Sports Arena, Budapest; Attendance: 10,000; Referees: Hansen, Pettersen (NOR)
19 December 2004; 15:00	4× (yellow card) 7× (suspension)	Report	3× (yellow card) 6× (suspension) 1× (red card)	Budapest Sports Arena, Budapest; Attendance: 10,000; Referees: Hansen, Pettersen (NOR)

=== Final ===
19 December 2004; 17:30	Norway	27–25	Denmark	Budapest Sports Arena, Budapest; Attendance: 10,000; Referees: Nachevski, Nachevski (MKD)
19 December 2004; 17:30	Lunde 6	(11–11)	Hørlykke, Thomsen 4	Budapest Sports Arena, Budapest; Attendance: 10,000; Referees: Nachevski, Nachevski (MKD)
19 December 2004; 17:30	3× (yellow card) 5× (suspension)	Report	3× (yellow card) 5× (suspension)	Budapest Sports Arena, Budapest; Attendance: 10,000; Referees: Nachevski, Nachevski (MKD)

== Ranking and statistics ==
=== Final ranking ===
Gold medal	Norway
Silver medal	Denmark
Bronze medal	Hungary
4	Russia
5	Germany
6	Ukraine
7	Romania
8	Spain
9	Slovenia
10	Austria
11	France
12	Serbia and Montenegro
13	Croatia
14	Sweden
15	Czech Republic
16	Belarus

2004 Women's European Champions

Norway
2nd title

Team roster

Else-Marthe Sørlie Lybekk, Kristine Lunde, Kari Mette Johansen, Isabel Blanco, Vigdis Hårsaker, Randi Gustad, Elisabeth Hilmo, Karoline Dyhre Breivang, Gro Hammerseng, Katja Nyberg, Ragnhild Aamodt, Camilla Thorsen, Linn-Kristin Riegelhuth, Gøril Snorroeggen, Kjersti Beck, Terese Pedersen and Katrine Lunde.
Head coach: Marit Breivik.

=== All-Star Team ===
- Goalkeeper: Karin Mortensen (DEN)
- Left wing: Olena Radchenko (UKR)
- Left back: Tanja Logvin (AUT)
- Pivot: Lyudmila Bodniyeva (RUS)
- Centre back: Gro Hammerseng (NOR)
- Right back: Grit Jurack (GER)
- Right wing: Josephine Touray (DEN)
- Most valuable player: Gro Hammerseng (NOR)

Chosen by team officials and EHF experts: EHF Archived 2020-08-08 at the Wayback Machine

=== Top goalscorers ===
Rank	Name	Team	Goals	Shots	%
1	Bojana Radulovics	Hungary	72	123	59
2	Tatjana Logvin	Austria	63	111	57
3	Elena Avadanii	Romania	46	62	74
4	Grit Jurack	Germany	43	86	50
5	Lyudmila Bodniyeva	Russia	42	49	86
5	Olena Reznir	Ukraine	42	84	50
7	Liudmila Postnova	Russia	41	84	49
8	Gro Hammerseng	Norway	38	55	69
9	Mette Sjøberg	Denmark	37	72	51
10	Leila Lejeune	France	35	61	57
10	Linn-Kristin Riegelhuth	Norway	35	60	58

Source: EHF

=== Top goalkeepers ===
Rank	Name	Team	%	Saves	Shots
1	Nataliya Borysenko	Ukraine	41	48	117
1	Karin Mortensen	Denmark	41	87	210
3	Madeleine Grundström	Sweden	39	51	132
3	Katrine Lunde	Norway	39	54	138
5	Kjersti Beck	Norway	38	58	152
5	Irina Sirina	Hungary	38	37	97
7	Alexandra Gräfer	Germany	36	52	143
8	Luminița Dinu	Romania	35	59	168
8	Natalia Petrakova	Belarus	35	33	93
8	Paula Rădulescu	Romania	35	41	117
8	Sergeja Stefanišin	Slovenia	35	64	181
8	Larysa Zaspa	Ukraine	35	56	159

Source: EHF
