= Line Daugaard =

Danish handball player (born 1978)

Line Fruensgaard
Personal information
- Full name: Line Widt Fruensgaard
- Nationality: Danish
- Born: 17 July 1978 (age 48) Herning, Denmark
- Height: 1.72 m (5 ft 8 in)

Sport
- Sport: Handball
- Position: Left wing
- Number: 10

Youth career
- Years: Team
- 1989-1997: Ikast fS

Senior clubs
- Years: Team
- 1997-2000: Ikast fS
- 2000–2001: Brabrand IF
- 2001-2009: Ikast-Bording EH
- 2009-2010: FC Midtjylland Håndbold
National team
Years	Team	Apps	(Gls)
1999-2004	Denmark	108	(307)
Medal record
Women's handball
Representing Denmark
Olympic Games
Gold medal – first place	2004 Athens	Team competition
European Championship
Gold medal – first place	2002 Denmark	Team competition

Line Fruensgaard (formerly Daugaard; born 17 July 1978) is a Danish former team handball player and Olympic champion. She received a gold medal with the Danish national team at the 2004 Summer Olympics in Athens. She also won the 2002 European Women's Handball Championship, where she was selected for the all star team. She was also on the all star team for the 2004 Summer Olympics in Athens.

Daugaard started playing handball when she 8. She played almost her entire career at Ikast fS (under various club names). The only exception is a single season in 2000/2001 at Brabrand IF. With Ikast fS she won the City Cup 1998, the Danish league 1998, the EHF Cup 2002, EHF Cup Winners' Cup in 2004. She also won the Danish Cup three times. From January 2006 until the end of the 2005-06 season she was on maternity leave. She retired in 2010.

Her husband, Jeppe Fruensgaard, is also a former handball player, and her daughter, Hannah Widt Fruensgaard is a professional football player.
