= Vivi Kjærsgaard =

Danish handball player (born 1967)

Personal information
- Nationality: Danish
- Born: 23 November 1967 (age 58) Viborg, Denmark

Sport
- Sport: Handball

Senior clubs
- Years: Team
- 1987-1992: Horsens HK
- 1992-1994: Skovbakken
- 1999-2001: Skovbakken
National team
| Years | Team | Apps | (Gls) |
| 1987-1993 | Denmark | 68 | (94) |
Medal record
World Championship
| Silver medal – second place | 1993 Norway |

Vivi Kjærsgaard (born 23 November 1967) is a Danish former handball player, who was part of the Danish team that won silver medals at the 1993 World Championship in Norway. She was the captain of the Danish national team.

She made her debut for the Danish national team on 18 November 1987. Her last match for Denmark was the 1993 World Championship final, which Denmark lost to Germany 21–22.

At club level she played for Horsens HK and Skovbakken.

== Private life ==
Her son is the Danish golf player Oliver Jespersen, and she is married to former soccer player Henrik Jespersen, who won the Danish championship with AGF in 1986.

After her playing career she has worked at Hummel International and as a teacher at Handelsfagskolen.
