= 2002 European Women's Handball Championship =

2002 EHF European Women's Handball Championship

Tournament details
- Host country: Denmark
- Venues: 3 (in 3 host cities)
- Dates: 6–15 December
- Teams: 16 (from 1 confederation)

Final positions
- Champions: Denmark (3rd title)
- Runners-up: Norway
- Third place: France
- Fourth place: Russia

Tournament statistics
- Matches played: 48
- Goals scored: 2,448 (51 per match)
- Top scorer(s): Ágnes Farkas (HUN) (58 goals)

Awards
- Best player: Karin Mortensen (DEN)

The 2002 EHF European Women's Handball Championship was held in Denmark from 6–15 December. It was won by Denmark after beating Norway 25–22 in the final match. This tournament was the first to feature 16 teams instead of the 12 that had been the case since the start i 1994.

== Venues ==
The European Championships was held in the following cities:

- Helsinge (Preliminary Group A)
- Aarhus (Preliminary Group B, Preliminary Group D, Main Group 1, Final Round)
- Farum Arena (Preliminary Group C, Main Group 2)

== Qualification ==
Country	Qualified as	Previous appearances in tournament
Denmark	Host	4 (**1994**, **1996**, 1998, 2000)
Hungary	Semifinalist of 2000 European Championship	4 (1994, 1996, 1998, **2000**)
Ukraine	Semifinalist of 2000 European Championship	4 (1994, 1996, 1998, 2000)
Russia	Semifinalist of 2000 European Championship	4 (1994, 1996, 1998, 2000)
Romania	Semifinalist of 2000 European Championship	4 (1994, 1996, 1998, 2000)
France	Fifth place of 2000 European Championship	1 (2000)
Austria	Playoff winner	4 (1994, 1996, 1998, 2000)
Belarus	Playoff winner	1 (2000)
Czech Republic	Playoff winner	1 (1994)
Germany	Playoff winner	4 (1994, 1996, 1998, 2000)
Netherlands	Playoff winner	1 (1998)
Norway	Playoff winner	3 (1994, 1996, **1998**, 2000)
Slovenia	Playoff winner	0 (Debut)
Spain	Playoff winner	1 (1998)
Sweden	Playoff winner	2 (1994, 1996)
Yugoslavia	Playoff winner	1 (2000)

Note: Bold indicates champion for that year. Italic indicates host for that year.

== Competition format ==
- Preliminary round: 16 teams are divided into four groups. They play each other in a single round robin system, so each team plays three matches. A win is worth two points, while a draw is worth one point. The top three teams from each group advance to the Main Round.
- Main Round: 12 teams are divided in two groups. They play against the teams they didn't play in the preliminary round, so each team plays 3 matches. All points from the preliminary round, except the points gained against the 4th place team in the preliminary group, are carried forward into the Main Round. Same round robin rules apply as in the preliminary round. Top 2 teams from each group advance to the semifinals, while the third placed team from each group advances to the 5th-6th Place Play-off, and the fourth placed team to the 7th-8th Place Play-off.
- Final Round: 8 teams play in the final weekend of the championships. 3rd place teams from the Main Round play in the 5th-6th Place Play-off, and 4th place team to the 7th-8th Place Play-off. Other teams play in the semifinals. Losers of the semifinals advance to the 3rd-4th Place Play-off, and winners advance to the Final.

== Preliminary round ==
=== Group A ===
Pos	Team	Pld	W	D	L	GF	GA	GD	Pts	Qualification
1	Yugoslavia	3	3	0	0	93	76	+17	6	Main round
2	Romania	3	2	0	1	82	78	+4	4	Main round
3	Austria	3	1	0	2	77	83	−6	2	Main round
4	Sweden	3	0	0	3	79	94	−15	0	

Source: EHF
Rules for classification: 1) points; 2) head-to-head points; 3) head-to-head goal difference; 4) head-to-head number of goals scored; 5) goal difference.

6 December 2002; 18:30	Romania	27–21	Austria	Helsinge-Hallen, Helsinge; Attendance: 1,000; Referees: Liachovičius, Paškevičius (LTU)
6 December 2002; 18:30		(12–11)		Helsinge-Hallen, Helsinge; Attendance: 1,000; Referees: Liachovičius, Paškevičius (LTU)
6 December 2002; 18:30		Report		Helsinge-Hallen, Helsinge; Attendance: 1,000; Referees: Liachovičius, Paškevičius (LTU)

6 December 2002; 20:30	Yugoslavia	31–28	Sweden	Helsinge-Hallen, Helsinge; Attendance: 1,200; Referees: Bashev, Dobrev (BUL)
6 December 2002; 20:30		(15–16)		Helsinge-Hallen, Helsinge; Attendance: 1,200; Referees: Bashev, Dobrev (BUL)
6 December 2002; 20:30		Report		Helsinge-Hallen, Helsinge; Attendance: 1,200; Referees: Bashev, Dobrev (BUL)

7 December 2002; 16:30	Sweden	25–30	Romania	Helsinge-Hallen, Helsinge; Attendance: 900; Referees: Fernández, Permuy (ESP)
7 December 2002; 16:30		(12–14)		Helsinge-Hallen, Helsinge; Attendance: 900; Referees: Fernández, Permuy (ESP)
7 December 2002; 16:30		Report		Helsinge-Hallen, Helsinge; Attendance: 900; Referees: Fernández, Permuy (ESP)

7 December 2002; 18:30	Austria	23–30	Yugoslavia	Helsinge-Hallen, Helsinge; Attendance: 942; Referees: Migas, Bavas (GRE)
7 December 2002; 18:30		(9–15)		Helsinge-Hallen, Helsinge; Attendance: 942; Referees: Migas, Bavas (GRE)
7 December 2002; 18:30		Report		Helsinge-Hallen, Helsinge; Attendance: 942; Referees: Migas, Bavas (GRE)

8 December 2002; 16:30	Romania	25–32	Yugoslavia	Helsinge-Hallen, Helsinge; Attendance: 930; Referees: Rančík, Beňo (SVK)
8 December 2002; 16:30		(13–16)		Helsinge-Hallen, Helsinge; Attendance: 930; Referees: Rančík, Beňo (SVK)
8 December 2002; 16:30		Report		Helsinge-Hallen, Helsinge; Attendance: 930; Referees: Rančík, Beňo (SVK)

8 December 2002; 18:30	Austria	33–26	Sweden	Helsinge-Hallen, Helsinge; Attendance: 650; Referees: Kékes, Kékes (HUN)
8 December 2002; 18:30		(20–10)		Helsinge-Hallen, Helsinge; Attendance: 650; Referees: Kékes, Kékes (HUN)
8 December 2002; 18:30		Report		Helsinge-Hallen, Helsinge; Attendance: 650; Referees: Kékes, Kékes (HUN)

=== Group B ===
Pos	Team	Pld	W	D	L	GF	GA	GD	Pts	Qualification
1	Denmark (H)	3	3	0	0	74	63	+11	6	Main round
2	France	3	2	0	1	66	65	+1	4	Main round
3	Ukraine	3	1	0	2	72	77	−5	2	Main round
4	Netherlands	3	0	0	3	73	80	−7	0	

Source: EHF
Rules for classification: 1) points; 2) head-to-head points; 3) head-to-head goal difference; 4) head-to-head number of goals scored; 5) goal difference.
(H) Hosts

6 December 2002; 18:30	France	25–24	Netherlands	Arenaen, Aarhus; Attendance: 3,000; Referees: Migas, Bavas (GRE)
6 December 2002; 18:30		(11–12)		Arenaen, Aarhus; Attendance: 3,000; Referees: Migas, Bavas (GRE)
6 December 2002; 18:30		Report		Arenaen, Aarhus; Attendance: 3,000; Referees: Migas, Bavas (GRE)

6 December 2002; 20:45	Ukraine	23–27	Denmark	Arenaen, Aarhus; Attendance: 4,200; Referees: Fernández, Permuy (ESP)
6 December 2002; 20:45		(12–14)		Arenaen, Aarhus; Attendance: 4,200; Referees: Fernández, Permuy (ESP)
6 December 2002; 20:45		Report		Arenaen, Aarhus; Attendance: 4,200; Referees: Fernández, Permuy (ESP)

7 December 2002; 18:30	Denmark	20–17	France	Arenaen, Aarhus; Attendance: 4,000; Referees: Kékes, Kékes (HUN)
7 December 2002; 18:30		(11–7)		Arenaen, Aarhus; Attendance: 4,000; Referees: Kékes, Kékes (HUN)
7 December 2002; 18:30		Report		Arenaen, Aarhus; Attendance: 4,000; Referees: Kékes, Kékes (HUN)

7 December 2002; 20:30	Netherlands	26–28	Ukraine	Arenaen, Aarhus; Attendance: 2,500; Referees: Rančík, Beňo (SVK)
7 December 2002; 20:30		(14–17)		Arenaen, Aarhus; Attendance: 2,500; Referees: Rančík, Beňo (SVK)
7 December 2002; 20:30		Report		Arenaen, Aarhus; Attendance: 2,500; Referees: Rančík, Beňo (SVK)

8 December 2002; 18:30	Ukraine	21–24	France	Arenaen, Aarhus; Attendance: 3,000; Referees: Bashev, Dobrev (BUL)
8 December 2002; 18:30		(10–11)		Arenaen, Aarhus; Attendance: 3,000; Referees: Bashev, Dobrev (BUL)
8 December 2002; 18:30		Report		Arenaen, Aarhus; Attendance: 3,000; Referees: Bashev, Dobrev (BUL)

8 December 2002; 20:45	Denmark	27–23	Netherlands	Arenaen, Aarhus; Attendance: 4,100; Referees: Liachovičius, Paškevičius (LTU)
8 December 2002; 20:45		(15–10)		Arenaen, Aarhus; Attendance: 4,100; Referees: Liachovičius, Paškevičius (LTU)
8 December 2002; 20:45		Report		Arenaen, Aarhus; Attendance: 4,100; Referees: Liachovičius, Paškevičius (LTU)

=== Group C ===
Pos	Team	Pld	W	D	L	GF	GA	GD	Pts	Qualification
1	Norway	3	2	1	0	75	61	+14	5	Main round
2	Russia	3	1	1	1	67	70	−3	3	Main round
3	Germany	3	1	0	2	71	78	−7	2 (Note: Germany 31–27 Spain)	Main round
4	Spain	3	0	2	1	76	80	−4	2	

Source: EHF
Rules for classification: 1) points; 2) head-to-head points; 3) head-to-head goal difference; 4) head-to-head number of goals scored; 5) goal difference.
Notes:

6 December 2002; 18:15	Russia	25–22	Germany	Farum Arena, Copenhagen; Attendance: 1,000; Referees: La Cour Bruun, Nielsen (DEN)
6 December 2002; 18:15	three players 5	(12–10)	Wagner 7	Farum Arena, Copenhagen; Attendance: 1,000; Referees: La Cour Bruun, Nielsen (DEN)
6 December 2002; 18:15	3× (yellow card) 5× (suspension)	Report	3× (yellow card) 2× (suspension)	Farum Arena, Copenhagen; Attendance: 1,000; Referees: La Cour Bruun, Nielsen (DEN)

6 December 2002; 20:15	Norway	25–25	Spain	Farum Arena, Copenhagen; Attendance: 1,200; Referees: Marić, Gardinovački (FRY)
6 December 2002; 20:15		(12–15)		Farum Arena, Copenhagen; Attendance: 1,200; Referees: Marić, Gardinovački (FRY)
6 December 2002; 20:15		Report		Farum Arena, Copenhagen; Attendance: 1,200; Referees: Marić, Gardinovački (FRY)

7 December 2002; 16:30	Germany	18–26	Norway	Farum Arena, Copenhagen; Attendance: 2,000; Referees: Shal, Konoplyastyy (UKR)
7 December 2002; 16:30		(9–15)		Farum Arena, Copenhagen; Attendance: 2,000; Referees: Shal, Konoplyastyy (UKR)
7 December 2002; 16:30		Report		Farum Arena, Copenhagen; Attendance: 2,000; Referees: Shal, Konoplyastyy (UKR)

7 December 2002; 18:30	Spain	24–24	Russia	Farum Arena, Copenhagen; Attendance: 941; Referees: Borrotti, Marcet (FRA)
7 December 2002; 18:30	Andreu, Puche 4	(10–13)	Poltoratskaya 7	Farum Arena, Copenhagen; Attendance: 941; Referees: Borrotti, Marcet (FRA)
7 December 2002; 18:30	3× (yellow card) 4× (suspension)	Report	3× (yellow card) 8× (suspension) 1× (red card)	Farum Arena, Copenhagen; Attendance: 941; Referees: Borrotti, Marcet (FRA)

8 December 2002; 18:30	Germany	31–27	Spain	Farum Arena, Copenhagen; Attendance: 1,500; Referees: Vitzthum, Choquard (SUI)
8 December 2002; 18:30		(15–14)		Farum Arena, Copenhagen; Attendance: 1,500; Referees: Vitzthum, Choquard (SUI)
8 December 2002; 18:30		Report		Farum Arena, Copenhagen; Attendance: 1,500; Referees: Vitzthum, Choquard (SUI)

8 December 2002; 20:30	Russia	18–24	Norway	Farum Arena, Copenhagen; Attendance: 1,700; Referees: Reisinger, Kaschütz (AUT)
8 December 2002; 20:30	Bodniyeva, Poltoratskaya 4	(11–13)	Olsson Rosenberg 11	Farum Arena, Copenhagen; Attendance: 1,700; Referees: Reisinger, Kaschütz (AUT)
8 December 2002; 20:30	3× (yellow card) 5× (suspension)	Report	3× (yellow card) 3× (suspension)	Farum Arena, Copenhagen; Attendance: 1,700; Referees: Reisinger, Kaschütz (AUT)

=== Group D ===
Pos	Team	Pld	W	D	L	GF	GA	GD	Pts	Qualification
1	Hungary	3	3	0	0	98	77	+21	6	Main round
2	Czech Republic	3	2	0	1	76	72	+4	4	Main round
3	Slovenia	3	1	0	2	75	79	−4	2	Main round
4	Belarus	3	0	0	3	65	86	−21	0	

Source: EHF
Rules for classification: 1) points; 2) head-to-head points; 3) head-to-head goal difference; 4) head-to-head number of goals scored; 5) goal difference.

6 December 2002; 14:30	Czech Republic	25–20	Slovenia	Arenaen, Aarhus; Attendance: 700; Referees: Reisinger, Kaschütz (AUT)
6 December 2002; 14:30		(10–14)		Arenaen, Aarhus; Attendance: 700; Referees: Reisinger, Kaschütz (AUT)
6 December 2002; 14:30		Report		Arenaen, Aarhus; Attendance: 700; Referees: Reisinger, Kaschütz (AUT)

6 December 2002; 16:30	Hungary	34–23	Belarus	Arenaen, Aarhus; Attendance: 700; Referees: Vitzthum, Choquard (SUI)
6 December 2002; 16:30		(16–12)		Arenaen, Aarhus; Attendance: 700; Referees: Vitzthum, Choquard (SUI)
6 December 2002; 16:30		Report		Arenaen, Aarhus; Attendance: 700; Referees: Vitzthum, Choquard (SUI)

7 December 2002; 14:30	Belarus	19–25	Czech Republic	Arenaen, Aarhus; Attendance: 350; Referees: La Cour Bruun, Nielsen (DEN)
7 December 2002; 14:30		(8–10)		Arenaen, Aarhus; Attendance: 350; Referees: La Cour Bruun, Nielsen (DEN)
7 December 2002; 14:30		Report		Arenaen, Aarhus; Attendance: 350; Referees: La Cour Bruun, Nielsen (DEN)

7 December 2002; 16:30	Slovenia	28–31	Hungary	Arenaen, Aarhus; Attendance: 600; Referees: Marić, Gardinovački (FRY)
7 December 2002; 16:30		(14–16)		Arenaen, Aarhus; Attendance: 600; Referees: Marić, Gardinovački (FRY)
7 December 2002; 16:30		Report		Arenaen, Aarhus; Attendance: 600; Referees: Marić, Gardinovački (FRY)

8 December 2002; 14:30	Belarus	23–27	Slovenia	Arenaen, Aarhus; Attendance: 1,000; Referees: Borrotti, Marcet (FRA)
8 December 2002; 14:30		(15–16)		Arenaen, Aarhus; Attendance: 1,000; Referees: Borrotti, Marcet (FRA)
8 December 2002; 14:30		Report		Arenaen, Aarhus; Attendance: 1,000; Referees: Borrotti, Marcet (FRA)

8 December 2002; 16:30	Hungary	33–26	Czech Republic	Arenaen, Aarhus; Attendance: 1,500; Referees: Shal, Konoplyastyy (UKR)
8 December 2002; 16:30		(17–13)		Arenaen, Aarhus; Attendance: 1,500; Referees: Shal, Konoplyastyy (UKR)
8 December 2002; 16:30		Report		Arenaen, Aarhus; Attendance: 1,500; Referees: Shal, Konoplyastyy (UKR)

== Main round ==
=== Group I ===
Pos	Team	Pld	W	D	L	GF	GA	GD	Pts	Qualification
1	Denmark (H)	5	5	0	0	126	108	+18	10	Semifinals
2	France	5	3	0	2	121	124	−3	6 (Note: FR Yugoslavia 27–29 France)	Semifinals
3	Yugoslavia	5	3	0	2	153	129	+24	6	Fifth place game
4	Romania	5	2	0	3	120	124	−4	4 (Note: Romania 27–21 Austria)	Seventh place game
5	Austria	5	2	0	3	126	124	+2	4	
6	Ukraine	5	0	0	5	104	141	−37	0	

Source: EHF
Rules for classification: 1) points; 2) head-to-head points; 3) head-to-head goal difference; 4) head-to-head number of goals scored; 5) goal difference.
(H) Hosts
Notes:

10 December 2002; 16:30	Austria	32–19	Ukraine	Arenaen, Aarhus; Attendance: 800; Referees: Fernández, Permuy (ESP)
10 December 2002; 16:30		(15–12)		Arenaen, Aarhus; Attendance: 800; Referees: Fernández, Permuy (ESP)
10 December 2002; 16:30		Report		Arenaen, Aarhus; Attendance: 800; Referees: Fernández, Permuy (ESP)

10 December 2002; 18:30	Yugoslavia	27–29	France	Arenaen, Aarhus; Attendance: 1,700; Referees: Liachovičius, Paškevičius (LTU)
10 December 2002; 18:30		(12–14)		Arenaen, Aarhus; Attendance: 1,700; Referees: Liachovičius, Paškevičius (LTU)
10 December 2002; 18:30		Report		Arenaen, Aarhus; Attendance: 1,700; Referees: Liachovičius, Paškevičius (LTU)

10 December 2002; 20:30	Romania	23–25	Denmark	Arenaen, Aarhus; Attendance: 4,200; Referees: Rančík, Beňo (SVK)
10 December 2002; 20:30		(9–14)		Arenaen, Aarhus; Attendance: 4,200; Referees: Rančík, Beňo (SVK)
10 December 2002; 20:30		Report		Arenaen, Aarhus; Attendance: 4,200; Referees: Rančík, Beňo (SVK)

11 December 2002; 16:30	Yugoslavia	39–24	Ukraine	Arenaen, Aarhus; Attendance: 800; Referees: Kékes, Kékes (HUN)
11 December 2002; 16:30		(19–8)		Arenaen, Aarhus; Attendance: 800; Referees: Kékes, Kékes (HUN)
11 December 2002; 16:30		Report		Arenaen, Aarhus; Attendance: 800; Referees: Kékes, Kékes (HUN)

11 December 2002; 18:30	Romania	26–29	France	Arenaen, Aarhus; Attendance: 3,100; Referees: Migas, Bavas (GRE)
11 December 2002; 18:30		(12–15)		Arenaen, Aarhus; Attendance: 3,100; Referees: Migas, Bavas (GRE)
11 December 2002; 18:30		Report		Arenaen, Aarhus; Attendance: 3,100; Referees: Migas, Bavas (GRE)

11 December 2002; 20:30	Austria	20–26	Denmark	Arenaen, Aarhus; Attendance: 4,200; Referees: Bashev, Dobrev (BUL)
11 December 2002; 20:30		(13–13)		Arenaen, Aarhus; Attendance: 4,200; Referees: Bashev, Dobrev (BUL)
11 December 2002; 20:30		Report		Arenaen, Aarhus; Attendance: 4,200; Referees: Bashev, Dobrev (BUL)

12 December 2002; 16:30	Romania	19–17	Ukraine	Arenaen, Aarhus; Attendance: 800; Referees: Liachovičius, Paškevičius (LTU)
12 December 2002; 16:30		(10–10)		Arenaen, Aarhus; Attendance: 800; Referees: Liachovičius, Paškevičius (LTU)
12 December 2002; 16:30		Report		Arenaen, Aarhus; Attendance: 800; Referees: Liachovičius, Paškevičius (LTU)

12 December 2002; 18:30	Austria	30–22	France	Arenaen, Aarhus; Attendance: 3,100; Referees: Rančík, Beňo (SVK)
12 December 2002; 18:30		(17–12)		Arenaen, Aarhus; Attendance: 3,100; Referees: Rančík, Beňo (SVK)
12 December 2002; 18:30		Report		Arenaen, Aarhus; Attendance: 3,100; Referees: Rančík, Beňo (SVK)

12 December 2002; 20:30	Yugoslavia	25–28	Denmark	Arenaen, Aarhus; Attendance: 4,200; Referees: Migas, Bavas (GRE)
12 December 2002; 20:30		(11–14)		Arenaen, Aarhus; Attendance: 4,200; Referees: Migas, Bavas (GRE)
12 December 2002; 20:30		Report		Arenaen, Aarhus; Attendance: 4,200; Referees: Migas, Bavas (GRE)

=== Group II ===
Pos	Team	Pld	W	D	L	GF	GA	GD	Pts	Qualification
1	Norway	5	5	0	0	135	103	+32	10	Semifinals
2	Russia	5	4	0	1	138	116	+22	8	Semifinals
3	Hungary	5	3	0	2	146	142	+4	6	Fifth place game
4	Czech Republic	5	2	0	3	120	129	−9	4	Seventh place game
5	Slovenia	5	1	0	4	124	143	−19	2	
6	Germany	5	0	0	5	111	141	−30	0	

Source: EHF
Rules for classification: 1) points; 2) head-to-head points; 3) head-to-head goal difference; 4) head-to-head number of goals scored; 5) goal difference.

10 December 2002; 16:30	Germany	26–30	Slovenia	Farum Arena, Copenhagen; Attendance: 500; Referees: Shal, Konoplyastyy (UKR)
10 December 2002; 16:30		(15–14)		Farum Arena, Copenhagen; Attendance: 500; Referees: Shal, Konoplyastyy (UKR)
10 December 2002; 16:30		Report		Farum Arena, Copenhagen; Attendance: 500; Referees: Shal, Konoplyastyy (UKR)

10 December 2002; 18:30	Norway	27–20	Czech Republic	Farum Arena, Copenhagen; Attendance: 500; Referees: Reisinger, Kaschütz (AUT)
10 December 2002; 18:30		(16–9)		Farum Arena, Copenhagen; Attendance: 500; Referees: Reisinger, Kaschütz (AUT)
10 December 2002; 18:30		Report		Farum Arena, Copenhagen; Attendance: 500; Referees: Reisinger, Kaschütz (AUT)

10 December 2002; 20:30	Russia	39–29	Hungary	Farum Arena, Copenhagen; Attendance: 500; Referees: La Cour Bruun, Nielsen (DEN)
10 December 2002; 20:30	Naukovich 16	(21–17)	Farkas 11	Farum Arena, Copenhagen; Attendance: 500; Referees: La Cour Bruun, Nielsen (DEN)
10 December 2002; 20:30	2× (yellow card) 7× (suspension)	Report	3× (yellow card) 5× (suspension)	Farum Arena, Copenhagen; Attendance: 500; Referees: La Cour Bruun, Nielsen (DEN)

11 December 2002; 16:30	Germany	25–30	Hungary	Farum Arena, Copenhagen; Attendance: 400; Referees: Reisinger, Kaschütz (AUT)
11 December 2002; 16:30		(14–15)		Farum Arena, Copenhagen; Attendance: 400; Referees: Reisinger, Kaschütz (AUT)
11 December 2002; 16:30		Report		Farum Arena, Copenhagen; Attendance: 400; Referees: Reisinger, Kaschütz (AUT)

11 December 2002; 18:30	Norway	34–24	Slovenia	Farum Arena, Copenhagen; Attendance: 600; Referees: Borrotti, Marcet (FRA)
11 December 2002; 18:30		(13–9)		Farum Arena, Copenhagen; Attendance: 600; Referees: Borrotti, Marcet (FRA)
11 December 2002; 18:30		Report		Farum Arena, Copenhagen; Attendance: 600; Referees: Borrotti, Marcet (FRA)

11 December 2002; 20:30	Russia	29–19	Czech Republic	Farum Arena, Copenhagen; Attendance: 300; Referees: Marić, Gardinovački (FRY)
11 December 2002; 20:30	Poltoratskaya 10	(12–10)	Čumplová 9	Farum Arena, Copenhagen; Attendance: 300; Referees: Marić, Gardinovački (FRY)
11 December 2002; 20:30	3× (yellow card) 5× (suspension)	Report	3× (yellow card) 3× (suspension)	Farum Arena, Copenhagen; Attendance: 300; Referees: Marić, Gardinovački (FRY)

12 December 2002; 16:30	Germany	20–30	Czech Republic	Farum Arena, Copenhagen; Attendance: 250; Referees: La Cour Bruun, Nielsen (DEN)
12 December 2002; 16:30		(7–14)		Farum Arena, Copenhagen; Attendance: 250; Referees: La Cour Bruun, Nielsen (DEN)
12 December 2002; 16:30		Report		Farum Arena, Copenhagen; Attendance: 250; Referees: La Cour Bruun, Nielsen (DEN)

12 December 2002; 18:30	Russia	27–22	Slovenia	Farum Arena, Copenhagen; Attendance: 650; Referees: Vitzthum, Choquard (SUI)
12 December 2002; 18:30	Poltoratskaya 8	(13–11)	Ilić 8	Farum Arena, Copenhagen; Attendance: 650; Referees: Vitzthum, Choquard (SUI)
12 December 2002; 18:30	3× (yellow card) 5× (suspension)	Report	2× (yellow card) 2× (suspension)	Farum Arena, Copenhagen; Attendance: 650; Referees: Vitzthum, Choquard (SUI)

12 December 2002; 20:30	Norway	24–23	Hungary	Farum Arena, Copenhagen; Attendance: 1,500; Referees: Shal, Konoplyastyy (UKR)
12 December 2002; 20:30		(13–11)		Farum Arena, Copenhagen; Attendance: 1,500; Referees: Shal, Konoplyastyy (UKR)
12 December 2002; 20:30		Report		Farum Arena, Copenhagen; Attendance: 1,500; Referees: Shal, Konoplyastyy (UKR)

== Final round ==
=== Bracket ===
Semifinals
14 December
Denmark	22
Russia	18
14 December
France	16
Norway	21

Final
15 December
Denmark	25
Norway	22
Third place
15 December
Russia	22
France	27

=== Semifinals ===
14 December 2002; 14:30	France	16–21	Norway	Arenaen, Aarhus; Attendance: 4,000; Referees: Migas, Bavas (GRE)
14 December 2002; 14:30	Cano 4	(8–9)	four players 3	Arenaen, Aarhus; Attendance: 4,000; Referees: Migas, Bavas (GRE)
14 December 2002; 14:30	3× (yellow card) 2× (suspension)	Report	3× (yellow card) 4× (suspension)	Arenaen, Aarhus; Attendance: 4,000; Referees: Migas, Bavas (GRE)

14 December 2002; 17:00	Denmark	22–18	Russia	Arenaen, Aarhus; Attendance: 4,200; Referees: Kékes, Kékes (HUN)
14 December 2002; 17:00	K. Andersen 7	(8–11)	Naukovich 7	Arenaen, Aarhus; Attendance: 4,200; Referees: Kékes, Kékes (HUN)
14 December 2002; 17:00	2× (yellow card) 2× (suspension)	Report	2× (yellow card) 3× (suspension)	Arenaen, Aarhus; Attendance: 4,200; Referees: Kékes, Kékes (HUN)

=== Seventh place game ===
14 December 2002; 12:00	Romania	19–17	Czech Republic	Arenaen, Aarhus; Attendance: 854; Referees: Fernández, Permuy (ESP)
14 December 2002; 12:00	Brădeanu 6	(13–8)	Adámková, Čumplová 4	Arenaen, Aarhus; Attendance: 854; Referees: Fernández, Permuy (ESP)
14 December 2002; 12:00	2× (yellow card) 4× (suspension)	Report	2× (yellow card) 4× (suspension)	Arenaen, Aarhus; Attendance: 854; Referees: Fernández, Permuy (ESP)

=== Fifth place game ===
15 December 2002; 12:00	Yugoslavia	39–43	Hungary	Arenaen, Aarhus; Attendance: 1,500; Referees: La Cour Bruun, Nielsen (DEN)
15 December 2002; 12:00	Knežević 10	(20–24)	Farkas 14	Arenaen, Aarhus; Attendance: 1,500; Referees: La Cour Bruun, Nielsen (DEN)
15 December 2002; 12:00	3× (yellow card) 5× (suspension)	Report	2× (yellow card) 8× (suspension) 1× (red card)	Arenaen, Aarhus; Attendance: 1,500; Referees: La Cour Bruun, Nielsen (DEN)

=== Third place game ===
15 December 2002; 14:30	Russia	22–27	France	Arenaen, Aarhus; Referees: Marić, Gardinovački (FRY)
15 December 2002; 14:30	Muravyova, Turey 5	(11–14)	Cano 8	Arenaen, Aarhus; Referees: Marić, Gardinovački (FRY)
15 December 2002; 14:30	2× (yellow card) 3× (suspension)	Report	3× (yellow card) 6× (suspension)	Arenaen, Aarhus; Referees: Marić, Gardinovački (FRY)

=== Final ===
15 December 2002; 17:00	Denmark	25–22	Norway	Arenaen, Aarhus; Attendance: 4,200; Referees: Rančík, Beňo (SVK)
15 December 2002; 17:00	Daugaard 6	(13–11)	Hammerseng 7	Arenaen, Aarhus; Attendance: 4,200; Referees: Rančík, Beňo (SVK)
15 December 2002; 17:00	2× (yellow card) 2× (suspension)	Report	2× (yellow card) 3× (suspension)	Arenaen, Aarhus; Attendance: 4,200; Referees: Rančík, Beňo (SVK)

== Final ranking and statistics ==
=== Final ranking ===
Gold medal	Denmark
Silver medal	Norway
Bronze medal	France
4	Russia
5	Hungary
6	Yugoslavia
7	Romania
8	Czech Republic
9	Austria
10	Slovenia
11	Germany
12	Ukraine
13	Spain
14	Netherlands
15	Sweden
16	Belarus

Source: EHF-Euro.com

2002 Women's European Champions

Denmark
3rd title

Team roster

Lene Rantala, Ditte Andersen, Mette Vestergaard Larsen, Camilla Thomsen, Christina Roslyng Hansen, Heidi Johansen, Rikke Hørlykke Bruun Jørgensen, Winnie Mølgaard, Karin Mortensen, Trine Jensen, Katrine Fruelund, Louise Bager Nørgaard, Kristine Andersen, Karen Brødsgaard, Line Daugaard, Josephine Touray.
Head coach: Jan Pytlick.

=== All-Star Team ===
- Goalkeeper: Karin Mortensen (DEN)
- Left wing: Line Daugaard (DEN)
- Left back: Ausra Fridrikas (AUT)
- Pivot: Lyudmila Bodniyeva (RUS)
- Centre back: Kristine Andersen (DEN)
- Right back: Lina Olsson Rosenberg (NOR)
- Right wing: Stéphanie Cano (FRA)
- Most valuable player: Karin Mortensen (DEN)

Chosen by team officials and EHF experts: EHF Archived 2021-12-22 at the Wayback Machine

=== Top goalscorers ===
Rank	Name	Team	Goals	Shots	%
1	Ágnes Farkas	Hungary	58	86	67
2	Ausra Fridrikas	Austria	54	100	54
3	Irina Poltoratskaya	Russia	53	96	55
4	Petra Čumplová	Czech Republic	52	70	74
5	Melinda Szabó	France	44	84	52
6	Kristine Andersen	Denmark	42	80	53
7	Bojana Petrović	Yugoslavia	38	72	53
7	Marina Naukovich	Russia	38	77	49
9	Lina Olsson Rosenberg	Norway	36	64	56
9	Silvana Ilić	Slovenia	36	65	55
9	Carmen Amariei	Romania	36	76	47

=== Top goalkeepers ===
(minimum 20% of total shots received by team)

Rank	Name	Team	%	Saves	Shots
1	Karin Mortensen	Denmark	48	117	245
2	Dragica Đurić	Yugoslavia	45	50	111
3	Heidi Tjugum	Norway	44	82	185
4	Lenka Černá	Czech Republic	41	83	203
5	Ildiko Barbu	Romania	40	43	107
6	Beate Hofmann	Austria	38	55	146
7	Iryna Honcharova	Ukraine	37	20	54
7	Mariya Sidorova	Russia	37	85	231
9	Luminița Dinu	Romania	36	57	159
9	Barbara Gorski	Slovenia	36	48	134
