= Frederikshavn FOX Team Nord =

Danish women's handball team

FOX Team Nord
- Full name: Frederikshavn FOX Team Nord
- Founded: March 2001
- Dissolved: May 2010
- Arena: Arena Nord, Frederikshavn
- Capacity: 2500

Frederikshavn FOX Team Nord (formerly FOX Team Nord) was a Danish women's handball team, founded in 2001 and dissolved in 2010. During the most successful seasons, they played in the Damehåndboldligaen, the top Danish league.

The team was founded through the merger of the clubs Frederikshavn fI and LSU Sæby in 2001. It used the license of the league club Frederikshavn fI, and thus overtook their place in the league. The team was owned by Fox Team Nord ApS.

The club alternated between playing in the top league and the second tier, the Danish 1st Division. Following bankruptcy, however, the team was relegated to the fourth tier of Danish handball, the 3rd division.

== Bankruptcy ==
On 4 May 2009 TV2/Nord reported that the team was in economic trouble, a claim which the club did not initially comment on. Three weeks later the club reported that it was on its way to secure stable funding for the following season.

24 March 2010 the club declared bankruptcy which relegated the team to the 3rd division for the 2010/2011 season.
