= Kulcsár =

Kulcsár or Kulcsar is a Hungarian surname that may refer to

- Anita Kulcsár (1976–2005), Hungarian handball player
  - Kulcsár Anita-emléktorna, Anita Kulcsár memorial handball tournament
- Dávid Kulcsár (born 1988), Hungarian football player
- Edina Kulcsár (born 1990), Hungarian actress, fashion model and beauty queen
- Janka Kulcsár (born 1985), Hungarian pianist
- János Kulcsár (1927–1989), Hungarian sprint canoer
- József Kulcsár (born 1954), Hungarian politician
- Gábor Kulcsar, Hungarian sprint canoer
- Gergely Kulcsár (1934–2020), Hungarian javelin thrower
- George Kulcsar (György Kulcsár, born 1967), Hungarian-Australian football player
- Győző Kulcsár (1940–2018), Hungarian fencer
- Kálmán Kulcsár (1928–2010), Hungarian politician and jurist
- Katalin Kulcsár (born 1984), Hungarian football referee
- Kornél Kulcsár (born 1991), Hungarian football player
- Krisztián Kulcsár (born 1971), Hungarian fencer, nephew of Győző
- Tamás Kulcsár (born 1982), Hungarian football player
