= Ausra Fridrikas =

Lithuanian-Austrian handball player (born 1967)

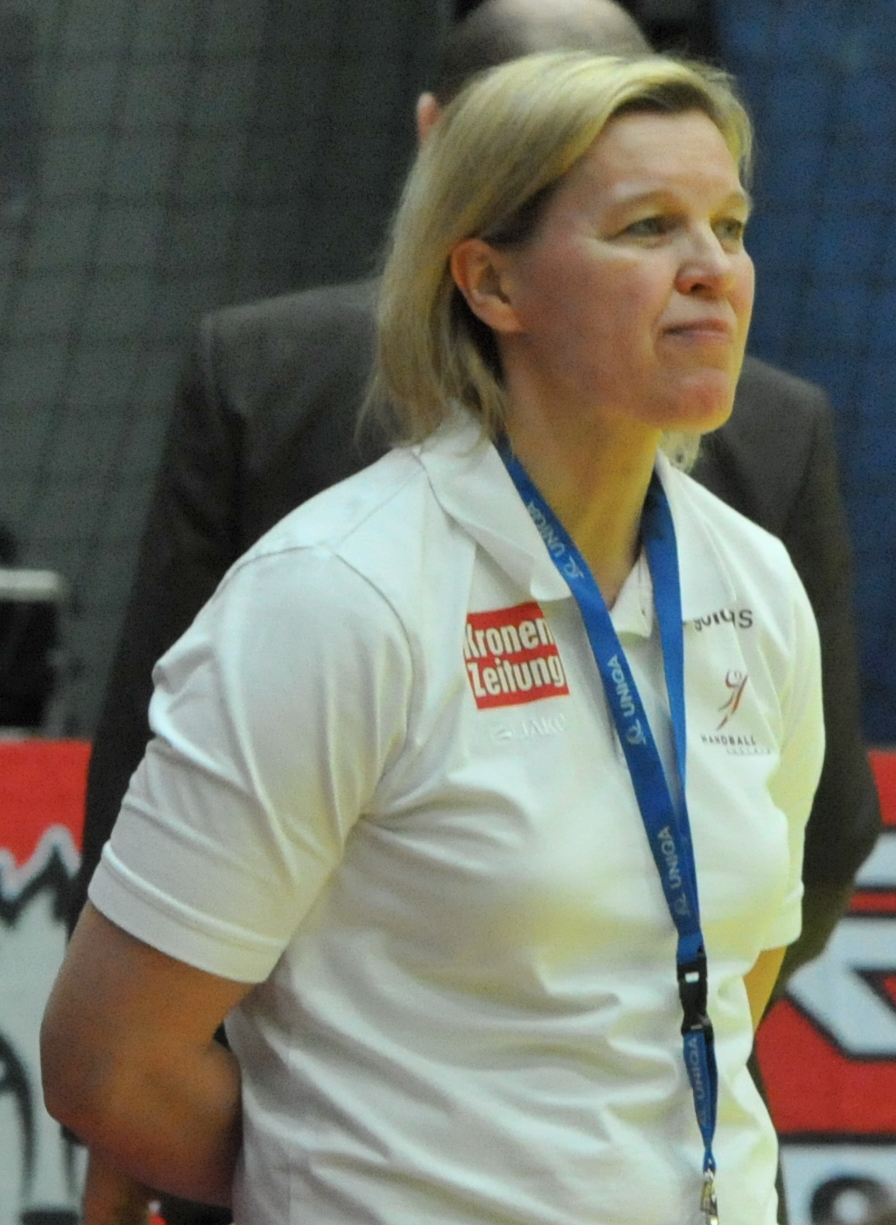

Personal information
- Full name: Aušrelė Miklušytė
- Nationality: Lithuanian, Austrian
- Born: 30 April 1967 (age 59) Varėna, Soviet Union
- Height: 1.77 m (5 ft 10 in)

Sport
- Sport: Handball
- Position: Left Back

Youth career
- Years: Team
- –: Zalgiris Kaunas

Senior clubs
- Years: Team
- 1987–1992: Eglė Vilnius
- 1992: CB Mar Valencia
- 1992–2000: Hypo Niederösterreich
- 2000–2002: Bækkelagets SK
- 2002–2005: Slagelse DT
- 2005–2006: ZVH Wiener Neustadt
- 2006–2007: Hypo Niederösterreich
National team
Years	Team	Apps	
-1991	Soviet Union	165	
1991-1993	Lithuania	86	
1994-2000	Austria	133	(1059)

Teams managed
- 2011-2017: Austria youth
Medal record
Representing the Soviet Union
World Championship
Gold medal – first place	1990 South Korea	Team
Representing Austria
World Championship
Bronze medal – third place	1999 Denmark/Norway	Team
European Championship
Bronze medal – third place	1996 Denmark	Team

Ausra Fridrikas (born Lithuanian: Aušra Miklušytė; formerly Ziukiene; 30 April 1967 in Lithuania) is a Lithuanian–Austrian handball player and World champion from 1990. She first played for Soviet Union, later for Lithuania and finally for Austria. She was voted World Handball Player of the Year 1999 by the International Handball Federation. She was selected most valuable player at the 1999 World championship, where she participated on the Austrian team and received a bronze medal. She also won a bronze medal at the 1996 European Championship, which remains Austria's only two medals to date (as of 2026).

With 1059 goals she is the second most scoring player on the Austrian team ever, only behind Jasna Kolar-Merdan.

She was included in the European Handball Federation Hall of Fame in 2023.

== Club handball ==
With Eglė Vilnius she won the EHF Cup in 1988. With Hypo Niederösterreich she won the Austrian Championship and Cup every season from 1993 to 2000, as well as the EHF Women's Champions League in 1993, 1994, 1995, 1998 and 2000. With Slagelse DT she won the EHF Cup in 2003 and the Champions League in 2004. That made her the first women's player to win the Champions League 6 times.

In 2005 she returned to Austria, where she joined ZV McDonald’s Wiener Neustadt. A year later she returned to Hypo Niederösterreich. Here she won the Austrian League and Cup double one last time, before retiring in 2007.

After her career she has coached the Austrian youth team.

== Personal life ==
Fridrikas married the Lithuanian international footballer Robertas Fridrikas, and their son Lukas also plays football professionally.

== See also ==
- List of women's handballers with 1000 or more international goals

Awards
Preceded by Trine Haltvik	IHF World Player of the Year – Women; 1999	Succeeded by Bojana Radulović
