= List of handballers with 1000 or more international goals =

List of handballers with 1000 or more international goals could refer to:

- List of men's handballers with 1000 or more international goals
- List of women's handballers with 1000 or more international goals
