= Barbara Sári =

Hungarian handball player (born 1990)

Personal information
- Full name: Barbara Sári
- Nationality: Hungarian
- Born: 6 November 1990 (age 35) Győr, Hungary
- Height: 1.72 m (5 ft 7 1/2 in)

Sport
- Sport: Handball
- Position: Line Player
- Current club: MTK Budapest

Youth career
- Years: Team
- 2005–2007: Győri ETO KC
- 2007–2008: Dunaújváros

Senior clubs
- Years: Team
- 2008–2012: Dunaújváros
- 2012–2013: Yellow Winterthur
- 2013–2014: Eszterházy KFSC
- 2014–2015: Békéscsabai ENKSE
- 2015–2020: Eszterházy KFSC
- 2020–2021: MTK Budapest
- 2021–: HC DAC

Barbara Sári (born 6 November 1990, in Győr) is a Hungarian handballer who plays for MTK Budapest as a line player. She is the daughter of former Hungarian international handballer and 1995 IHF World Player of the Year award winner Erzsébet Kocsis.
