= Boquist =

Boquist is a surname of Swedish origin, originating as an ornamental name meaning "dwelling home twig". Notable people with the surname include:

- Brian Boquist (born 1958), American politician
- Brooke Boquist (born 1996), Canadian ice hockey forward
- Martin Boquist (born 1977), Swedish handball coach and former player

== See also ==
- Boqvist
