= List of women's handballers with 1000 or more international goals =

This article is a list of female handballers with 1000 or more international goals for their national teams at senior level.

At least 15 female handballers to date have scored 1000 or more goals. Romania's Mariana Tîrcă holds the record, regardless of gender, for most goals scored in handball for national team with 2043 goals.

== By player ==
- updated as of 12 April 2026

Rank	Player	Goals	Ratio
1	(Romania) Mariana Tîrcă	2043	6.1
2	(Socialist Federal Republic of Yugoslavia) (Austria) Jasna Kolar-Merdan	1625 (Note: Jasna Kolar-Merdan scored 419 goals in 84 games for SFR Yugoslavia and 1206 goals for Austria in 163 games.)	6.58
3	(Germany) Grit Jurack	1581	5.87
4	(Spain) (Portugal) Alexandrina Cabral Barbosa	1366	4.88
5	(Soviet Union) (Unified Team at the Olympics) (Russia) (Spain) Natalia Morskova	1171	6.7
6	(Sweden) Mia Hermansson-Högdahl	1153	5.12
7	(Hungary) Anita Görbicz	1111	4.79
8	(Montenegro) Jovanka Radičević	1103	5.74
9	(Sweden) Åsa Mogensen	1087	4.33
10	(Soviet Union) (Lithuania) (Austria) Ausra Fridrikas	?+?+1059	7.96
11	(Tunisia) Mouna Chebbah	1036	4.37
12	(Spain) Marta Mangué	1034	3.44
13	(Sweden) Nathalie Hagman	1014	3.89
14	(Romania) Steluța Luca	1013	4.54
15	(Norway) Kjersti Grini	1003	4.99

== See also ==
- IHF World Player of the Year
- List of men's handballers with 1000 or more international goals
- List of national handball teams
