= Bojana Radulović =

Serbian-Hungarian handball player (born 1973)

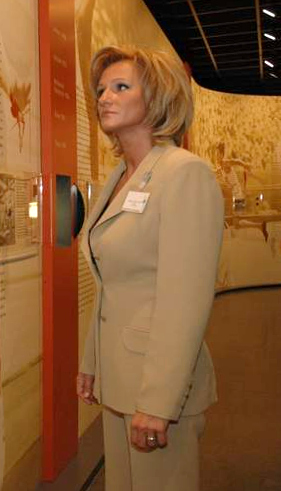
- Radulović in the Olympic Museum in Lausanne, 2004

Personal information
- Full name: Bojana Radulović
- Nationality: Yugoslav; Hungarian
- Born: 23 March 1973 (age 53) Subotica, SR Serbia, Yugoslavia
- Height: 1.79 m (5 ft 10 in)

Sport
- Sport: Handball
- Position: Right back

Senior clubs
- Years: Team
- –: ŽRK Radnički Belgrade
- –: BM Sagunto
- –1995: Caola SE
- 1995–2006: Dunaújváros
- 2006–2007: Győri ETO KC
- 2009–2011: Dunaújváros
National team
Years	Team	Apps	
1993–1999	FR Yugoslavia	70	
2000–2004	Hungary	69	(464)
Medal record
Olympic Games
Silver medal – second place	2000 Sydney	Team
World Championship
Silver medal – second place	2003 Croatia	Team
European Championship
Bronze medal – third place	2004 Hungary	Team
- Updated on 19 December 2004

Bojana Radulović (Note: In English, Radulović's surname in writing is interchangeably rendered as Radulovic, Radulovics (Hungarian variant) or Radulović (Serbian variant)) (Serbian Cyrillic: Бојана Радуловић, Hungarian: Radulovics Bojana; born 23 March 1973), is a retired Serbian-Hungarian handball player who currently leads the handball academy of Dunaújváros.

Often perceived as one of the best players of all time, she was voted IHF World Player of the Year in 2000 and 2003 by the International Handball Federation. At the club level, in addition to numerous domestic successes, she won every major European cup, including the EHF Champions League title in 1999. She won a silver medal with the Hungarian national team at the 2000 Summer Olympics in Sydney and another silver medal at the 2003 World Championship in Croatia. At the 2004 European Championship, played on home soil, Radulovics received a bronze medal after beating Russia 29–25 in the third place match.

== Career ==
=== Club ===
Radulovics started her career in her hometown club as a youngster and turned professional by ŽRK Radnički Belgrade, with them she won the EHF Cup Winners' Cup in 1991. Later she moved abroad to Spanish side BM Sagunto, followed by a switch to the Hungarian championship. First, she was signed by Caola SE, where her exceptional skills quickly became clear and despite playing for a rather low-table team, Radulovics won the top scorers' award in 1995. Her impressive performances were enough for Dunaújváros to move on the right back and the recently crowned EHF Cup Winners' Cup champions have secured her services after the end of the season.

She immediately became a key player by her new club, where she excelled with her creative style, intelligent game play and exceptional goalscoring instinct. She achieved the first success in 1998, when Dunaújváros did the treble by winning the EHF Cup, the Hungarian cup and the Hungarian championship. In the latter one Radulovics finished as the third-best goalgetter with 170 goals. By winning the national title, the Danube-side team entered the EHF Champions League in the following year, for the first time in their history. After a relatively easy early stage, the club battled through the quarterfinals and the semifinals in two close contested match-ups against Ikast FS (50–48) and Hypo Niederösterreich (50–49) to face Krim Ljubljana in the finals. On the home leg the reds, who played in front of their 4000 fans, built up a two-goal advantage, and the 26–26 draw on the rematch meant they have won the premier European tournament in club handball. Later that year Radulovics obtained the EHF Champions Trophy as well. By doing so, she collected all major continental titles by the age of only 26.

In the subsequent years Dunaújváros remained a top club, but on continental level they did not manage to win another trophy. They were the closest in 2003, when they played against Slagelse DT in the EHF Cup finals, but fell short to their Danish rivals by two goals on aggregate (47–49). In the domestic competitions Radulovics had more success: she has won five championship and as many cup titles during her time by the club. For her services to the team and the city, and her exemplary sportsmanship conduct, Radulovics was made Honorary Citizen of Dunaújváros in 2001.

In March 2006 Radulovics announced her plans to retire from professional handball, however, she received an offer from Győri Audi ETO KC she could not refuse and joined the Western Transdanubian team on a one-year deal.

On 8 October 2006 she suffered torn shoulder ligament while playing against her former club, which kept her sidelined for months. Although she completely recovered from the injury and what is more, she contributed with goals in the Hungarian cup final to win the title – her sixth, Radulovics decided not to extend her contract at the end of the season and finally quit handball. Not much later she moved back to Serbia to run her own business, an amusement- and safari park for children.

In September 2009 the Hungarian media was overflowed by the news that Radulovics might be reactivated and come back to help Dunaújváros, that lost most of their players due to their economy problems. These news proved to be true, and she played her first competitive match after two years of absence on 18 September 2009 against Hunnia KSK, scoring four goals and giving a number of assists in the fixture. Since her return, Radulovics played in top form, and although had an injury-plagued year behind her, she still ranked eleventh in the league's top scorers' list with 112 goals in the 2010–2011 season.

Following the decision of the Dunaújváros City Council on 28 October 2010, Radulovics has been named to manage the women's section of the newly forming handball academy, which is set to open in September 2011 and will run in co-operation with the College of Dunaújváros.

In accordance with her doctor's advice, Radulovics announced her final retirement from professional sport on 10 August 2011 and going to concentrate fully on her new job in the local handball academy.

=== International ===
Radulovics has been capped seventy times for the Yugoslavia national team, when in 1999, after playing for many years in Hungary, she has obtained the Hungarian citizenship and decided to represent Hungary on international level. She made her debut on 25 July 2000 against France and participated on the Olympic Games yet in that year, winning the silver medal after falling short to Denmark in the final. In the quarterfinals against Austria her goal saved the match to a regular time draw, coming back from a four-goal deficit with only five minutes from time. In the overtime, the Hungarians finally won the match in an epic battle (28–27). The following day in the semifinals they overcame Norway surprisingly easily (28–23), just to face Denmark in the final. The Hungarian team shown an excellent display and had a comfortable advantage, but suffered a meltdown in the latest part of the match and gave away the title. However, despite lost in the final, Radulovics, who finished fourth on the top scorers' list with 55 goals, was selected to the All-Star team of the tournament. Moreover, she was given both the Hungarian Handballer of the Year and the IHF World Player of the Year award in acknowledgement of her outstanding performances throughout the year.

Due to a knee injury she missed the European Championship in 2000, where Hungary won a consolatory gold medal. She went through a surgery and returned to action in the autumn of 2001, in preparation for the World Championship. Everyone expected to repeat her superb goalscoring form, but an ankle injury forced her to leave the field against Spain, and had to sit out the rest of the tournament, in which Hungary finished in the disappointing sixth position.

Because of her injury and later a maternity leave, Radulovics stayed away from handball until 2003. She returned to the national team on the 2003 World Championship in style, hitting nine goals against Romania and eight against South Korea en route to the final, where Hungary met with France. The Magyars dominated the match until 50 minutes, but the French team fought back and at 28–27 the referee shown on the penalty line with no time left. Leila Lejeune picked the ball and did not miss the 7-metre shot. The match ended up in overtime, where, in spite of Radulovics' 13 goals, Hungary lost 32–29. With an all-time record of 97 goals, the right back topped the top scorers' list, was selected to the All-Star team of the World Championship and later was handed over the IHF World Player of the Year for her accomplishments in 2003.

She was in top form on the 2004 Olympic Games once again, scoring not less than 54 goals, with that she deservedly was crowned as the top scorer of the tournament, on that Hungary finished fifth after two small margin defeats against Ukraine (22–23) and France (23–25). One of the most memorable matches for her was the placement match against Spain, in which she contributed with ten goals to the 38–29 victory.

On 18 October 2004 she was decorated with the SportStars Award, a prize that is given to the greatest individuals of their respective sports. A total of 54 athletes were recognized on the gala night, that was held in the Olympic Museum in Lausanne, including ones like multiple World and Olympic champion pole vaulter Yelena Isinbayeva, tennis stars Roger Federer and Justine Henin, basketball player Pau Gasol and fellow Hungarian modern pentathlete Zsuzsanna Vörös.

Radulovics' final major event was the European Championship in 2004, as she retired from international handball after the tournament. Although she dreamed about winning the gold medal in front of home crowd, Radulovics had to be content herself with a bronze after Hungary lost to Norway in the semifinals and beat Russia in the third place match. The Hungarian team set off with a three match winning run, with that they easily won their preliminary group. Radulovics played in terrific form, especially against Austria, hitting the back of the net 13 times. During the main round phase Hungary continued to play top quality handball, but suffered a one-goal defeat against Denmark, which cost them the top spot of the group and as a result, they had to face prime title candidates and eventually winners Norway in the semifinal. Radulovics scored ten goals against the Hammerseng-led Scandinavians, but it was not enough to go through the finals, since the rest of the team slightly underperformed and Hungary suffered a heavy loss (29–44).

On 19 December 2004, in the placement match against Russia, Radulovics wore the national team jersey the very last time. She helped her team with twelve goals to win the bronze medal clash, and also overtook Tatjana Logvin on the list of sharpshooters, collecting the top scorers' award with 72 goals.

"I don't think so that beside the family and club duties I would have enough power. It's time for the younger generation." – said the 31-year-old Radulovics in a post-match interview with tears in her eyes.

In 2010, she got an invitation to the Sportface Handball Gala, where she participated on a show match between the Hungarian Olympic team and the Danish Olympic team of 2000. The rematch of the Olympic Games final, that run under the name Sydney 2000 – Reloaded, ended with a 21–21 draw. However, it may remain more memorable for Radulovics that she was voted the Hungarian Handballer of the Decade and received the title just before the throw-off, in front of thousand of fans in the Főnix Hall.

In September 2011, Bojana's handprint and signature was immortalized on the Wall of Hungarian Sportstars'.

== Achievements ==
- Nemzeti Bajnokság I:
  - Winner: 1998, 1999, 2001, 2003, 2004
- Magyar Kupa:
  - Winner: 1998, 1999, 2000, 2002, 2004, 2007
- EHF Champions League
  - Winner: 1999
- EHF Cup Winners' Cup:
  - Winner: 1991
- EHF Cup:
  - Winner: 1998
  - Finalist: 2003
- EHF Champions Trophy:
  - Winner: 1999
- Olympic Games:
  - Silver Medalist: 2000
  - Fifth Placed: 2004
- World Championship:
  - Silver Medalist: 2003
  - Sixth Placed: 2001
- European Championship:
  - Bronze Medallist: 2004
  - Fifth Placed: 2002

== Awards and recognition ==
- Nemzeti Bajnokság I Top Scorer: 1995
- All-Star Right Back of the Olympic Games: 2000
- Knight's Cross of the Order of Merit of the Republic of Hungary: 2000
- Hungarian Handballer of the Year: 2000
- IHF World Player of the Year: 2000, 2003
- Honorary Citizen of Dunaújváros: 2001
- All-Star Right Back of the World Championship: 2003
- World Championship Top Scorer: 2003
- European Championship Top Scorer: 2004
- Olympic Games Top Scorer: 2004
- SportStars Award: 2004
- Hungarian Handballer of the Decade: 2010

Awards
Preceded by Ausra Fridrikas	IHF World Player of the Year – Women; 2000	Succeeded by Cecilie Leganger
Preceded by Zhai Chao	IHF World Player of the Year – Women; 2003	Succeeded by Anita Kulcsár
