= Kim Hyun-mee =

Kim Hyun-mee may refer to:

- Kim Hyun-mee (handballer)
- Kim Hyun-mee (politician)
