= Meldgaard =

Meldgaard is a Danish surname. Notable people with the surname include:

- Anne-Marie Meldgaard (born 1948), Danish politician
- Jørgen Meldgaard (1927–2007), Danish archeologist
- Kristian Meldgaard (born 1983), Danish handballer
- Mikkel Meldgaard alias Mikkel Metal (born 1973), Danish techno musician
- Søren Larsen Meldgaard (1850–1894), Danish teacher and school superintendent
