= Szabella-kupa =

The Szabella-Kupa (English: Szabella Cup) was a friendly handball event, which took place at least once every year until 2012, in parallel to the Kulcsár Anita Memorial Tournament. Sponsored by Sándor Szabella, it was created in 2007 and was organized until 2009 in August and in December. From 2010, the Szabella Cup was held only in August.

== Tournament structure ==
The first edition took place in August 2007, and altogether thirteen tournaments were organized. There was no permanent format for this friendly tournament, usually four teams (two Hungarians and two other European teams) played the Szabella Cup. But in August 2011 six teams participated. It was also the case in 2012: because of the Summer Olympics, there was only one tournament with six teams.

== Summary ==
Year	Host
Year	Host	Winner	Second	Third	Fourth	Fifth	Sixth
2007; Details	Győr	(Hungary); Győri Audi ETO KC	(Hungary); Budapest Bank-FTC	(Austria); Hypo Niederösterreich	(Croatia); RK Podravka Koprivnica
2007; Details	Budapest	(Austria); Hypo Niederösterreich	(Croatia); RK Lokomotiva Zagreb	(Hungary); Budapest Bank-FTC	(Hungary); Dunaferr NK
2008; Details	Győr	(Hungary); Győri Audi ETO KC	(Hungary); Dunaferr NK	(Russia); Lada Togliatti	(Croatia); Tvin Trgocentar
2008; Details	Dabas	(Hungary); Győri Audi ETO KC	(Croatia); RK Podravka Vegeta	(Hungary); Budapest Bank-FTC	(Montenegro); ŽRK Budućnost T-Mobile
2009; Details	Debrecen	(Austria); Hypo Niederösterreich	(Romania); CS Oltchim Râmnicu Vâlcea	(Hungary); DVSC-Aquaticum	(Hungary); Győri Audi ETO KC
2009; Details	Dabas	(Austria); Hypo Niederösterreich	(Montenegro); ŽRK Budućnost T-Mobile	(Hungary); FTC-RightPhone	(Hungary); Váci NKSE
2009; Details	Vác	(Montenegro); ŽRK Budućnost T-Mobile	(Hungary); Győri Audi ETO KC	(Austria); Hypo Niederösterreich	(Hungary); Váci NKSE
2010; Details	Győr	(Romania); CS Oltchim Râmnicu Vâlcea	(Austria); Hypo Niederösterreich	(Hungary); Győri Audi ETO KC	(Hungary); Váci NKSE
2010; Details	Vác	(Montenegro); ŽRK Budućnost T-Mobile	(Hungary); FTC	(Hungary); DVSC-Korvex	(Hungary); SYMA Váci NKSE
2011; Details	Siófok	(Hungary); Győri Audi ETO KC	(Spain); Grupo Asfi Itxako Navarra	(Romania); CS Oltchim Râmnicu Vâlcea	(Hungary); Siófok KC-Galerius Fürdő	(Austria); Hypo Niederösterreich	(Hungary); FTC-Rail Cargo Hungaria
2011; Details	Budapest	(Hungary); FTC-Rail Cargo Hungaria	(Montenegro); ŽRK Budućnost T-Mobile	(Spain); Grupo Asfi Itxako Navarra	(Hungary); DVSC-Fórum
2011; Details	Győr	(Hungary); Győri Audi ETO KC	(Norway); Larvik HK	(Hungary); FTC-Rail Cargo Hungaria	(Denmark); FC Midtjylland
2012; Details	Budapest	(Hungary); FTC-Rail Cargo Hungaria	(Romania); CS Oltchim Râmnicu Vâlcea	(Russia); Rostov-Don	(Austria); Hypo Niederösterreich	(Slovenia); RK Krim Mercator	(Montenegro); ŽRK Budućnost

== See also ==
- Kulcsár Anita-emléktorna
