= Gunnar Prokop =

Austrian handball coach (born 1940)

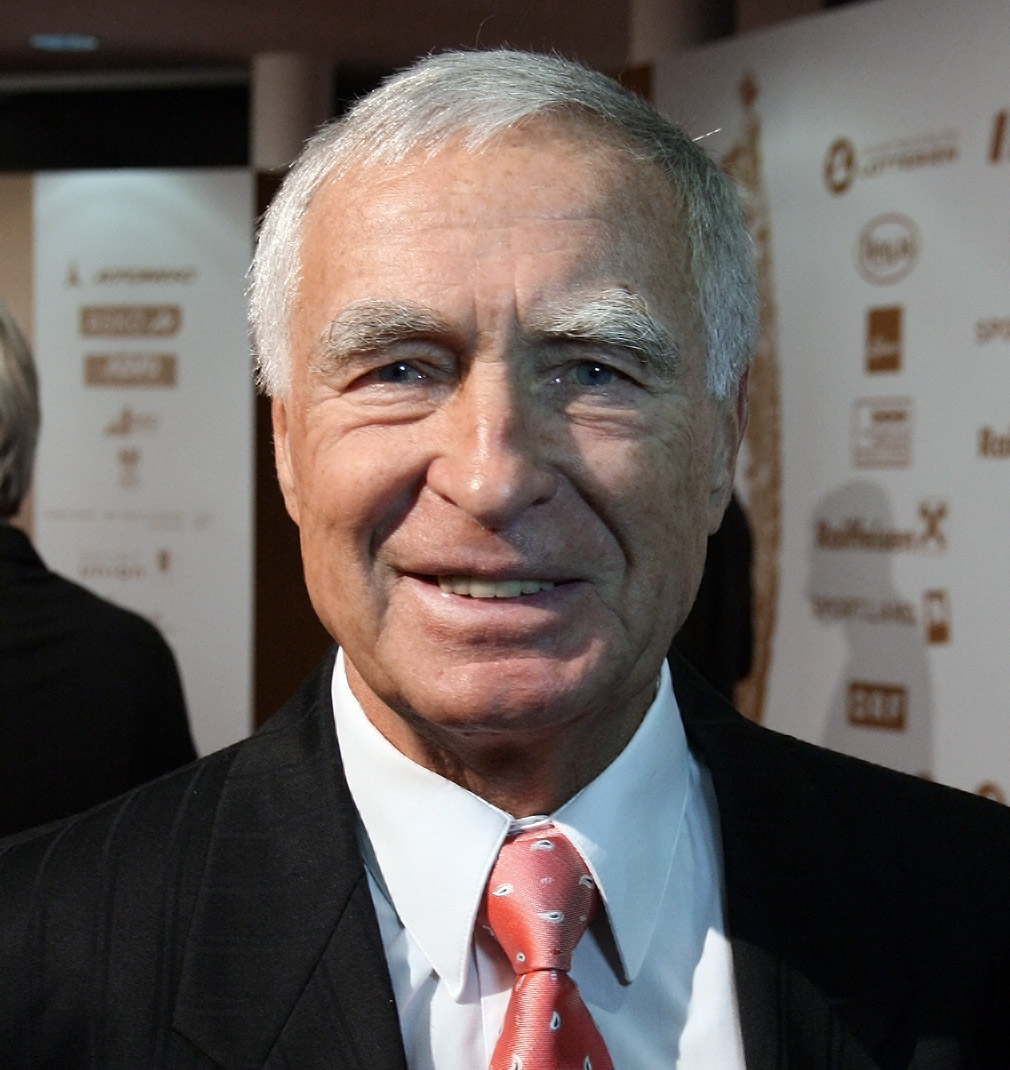
- Gunnar Prokop in 2011

Personal information
- Nationality: Austrian
- Born: 11 July 1940 (age 86) St. Polten, Austria

Sport
- Sport: Handball

Teams managed
- Years: Team
- 1972-2009: Hypo Niederösterreich

Gunnar Prokop (born 11 July 1940) is a former Austrian handball and athletics coach. He has previously been both president and coach for the handball club Hypo Niederösterreich. He is widely considered one of the best women's handball coaches of all time, but has been involved in controversy due to cheating as a coach and misogynistic remarks.

== Career ==
=== Athletics ===
Prokop started his career as a track and field coach at the 1964 Olympics in Tokyo, where he was the coach for Liese Sykora, who competed in pentathlon. They married a year later in 1965.

At the 1968 Olympics Liese Sykora-Prokop won a silver medal in the pentathlon, something Prokop has described as one of his best achievements.

=== Handball ===
In 1972 Prokop switched to women's handball, where he was involved in the creation of the Austrian club Hypo Niederösterreich, a club which he described as his "life work". During the 1980s he made the club into one of the best in the world. He won his first Austrian championship in 1977 and then went on to win every single league title until his resignation in 2009. His first international final was in 1987 when Hypo NÖ reached the EHF Cup. In 1989 he won the Champions League for the first time. In total, he won the tournament eight times between 1989 and 2000. He was one of the main drivers behind the Austria women's national handball team seeing relative success despite a small player pool.

==== 2009 controversy ====
On the 29th of October in a Champions League match with 7 seconds remaining against French Metz Handball, Gunnar Prokop entered the field and tackled Metz player Svetlana Ognjenović in order to stop a counterattack. The score was 27–27 at the time, and he thus prevented Metz from potentially winning the match. Prokop got a red card, but Metz could not score, and the match ended in a 27-27 draw.

In interviews immediately afterwards Prokop called the decision "tactically smart". Four days later he apologized for his actions. He also resigned as the head coach of Hypo Niederösterreich. Simultaneously, he announced that he would seek professional help to work through the situation. The day after, on November 4, 2009, the European Handball Federation suspended Prokop from all handball-related activities for three years, suspended him for life from all political and administrative positions in handball, and fined him 45,000 euros. The club received a fine of 30,000 euros. They also had 1 point deducted in the Champions League, the one point they had gained by drawing Metz. The fine was later changed to 10,000 euros, and Prokop's suspension was reduced to 1 year.

Prokop's actions have been called, among other things, "The worst action taken in handball in modern times" by Danish club Aalborg DH's director, Jan Hansen and "The most scandalous behaviour we have ever seen" by Swedish newspaper Aftonbladet.

A year later the Danish club Viborg HK accused him of going against his ban and communicating with the Hypo NÖ during a Champion League match.

His replacement as the head coach of Hypo Niederösterreich was Christian Mali.

== Other controversies ==
He was accused of misogynistic remarks in interviews, saying among other things that "women belongs in the kitchen".

In 2009 he was accused of offering referees paid vacations before they officiated a match between Hypo Niederösterreich and the Danish club Aalborg DH.

== Private life ==
He was married to Austrian athlete and politician Liese Prokop from 1965 until her death in 2006. Their daughter Karin Prokop became a top-level handball player between 1977 and 1995, and later became a politician for ÖVP. His grandchild, Gunnar Prokop, is a professional handball player.
