= Karin Prokop =

Austrian handball player (born 1966)

Personal information
- Full name: Karin Maria Ilona Prokop
- Nationality: Austrian
- Born: 11 February 1966 (age 60) Tulln an der Donau, Austria

Sport
- Sport: Handball
National team
- Years: Team
- 1984-1994: Austria

Karin Maria Ilona Prokop (born 11 February 1966) is an Austrian handball player, handball coach and politician.

She was born in Tulln an der Donau, a daughter of Austrian athlete Liese Sykora-Prokop and Austrian handball coach Gunnar Prokop.

== Handball career ==
Karin Prokop was active between 1977 and 1995. From 1982 she played for the first team of the Austrian top club Hypo Niederösterreich.

In 1984 she became a part of the Austrian national team.

She competed at the 1992 Summer Olympics, where Austria placed 5th and at the 1984 Summer Olympics where Austria finished 6th.

She also participated in the 1994 European Women's Handball Championship in Germany.

From 1994 to 1996 she worked as a sporting coordinator for the Austrian Handball Federation, where she was responsible for the 1995 World Women's Handball Championship in Austria.

== Political career ==
Like her mother Karin Prokop went into politics after her playing career in ÖVP.

She was elected in the Municipality Council of Maria Enzersdorf.

In 2012 she joined the party Team Stronach.
