= HP Warta =

Swedish handball club

- Full name: HP Warta
- Founded: 1972; 54 years ago
- Arena: Lundbystrand
- Capacity: 1,500
- President: Mats Bengtsson
- Head coach: Göran Karlsson (women's); Daniel Baskus (men's)
- League: Division 2 (women's); Division 1 (men's)
- Club colours
Home	Away

HP Warta is a handball club, based on Hisingen in Gothenburg, Sweden. The club was founded in 1972. The male team has played 16 seasons in Elitserien. The female team won the Elitserien regular season 1997 and silver in 1985. Their home venue is Lundbystrand. In 1985 the men's team became Swedish Champions in outdoor handball.

Location of HP Warta

== Kits ==
HOME
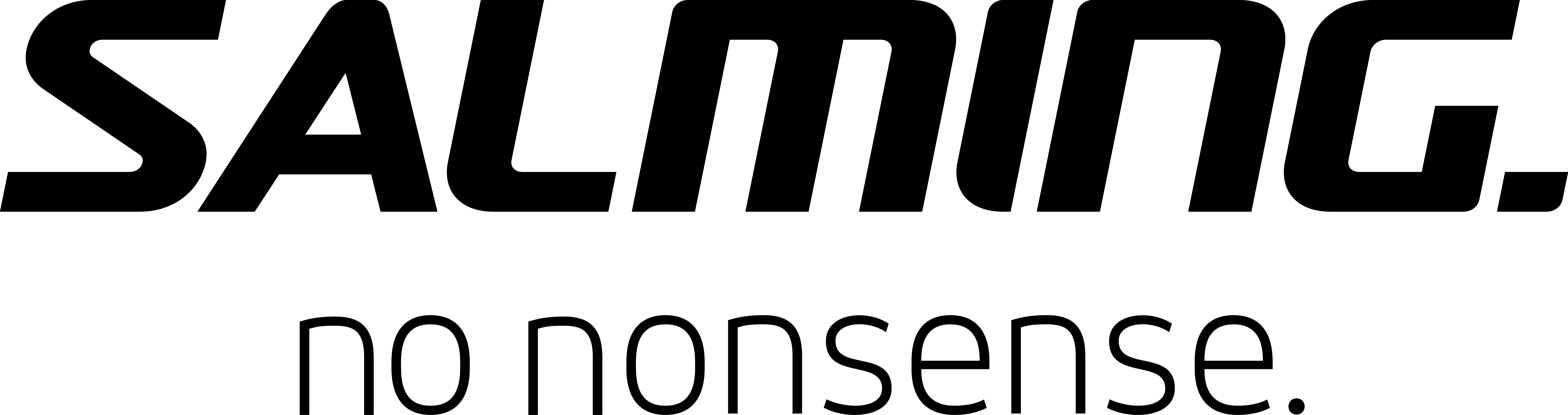
2019-

AWAY
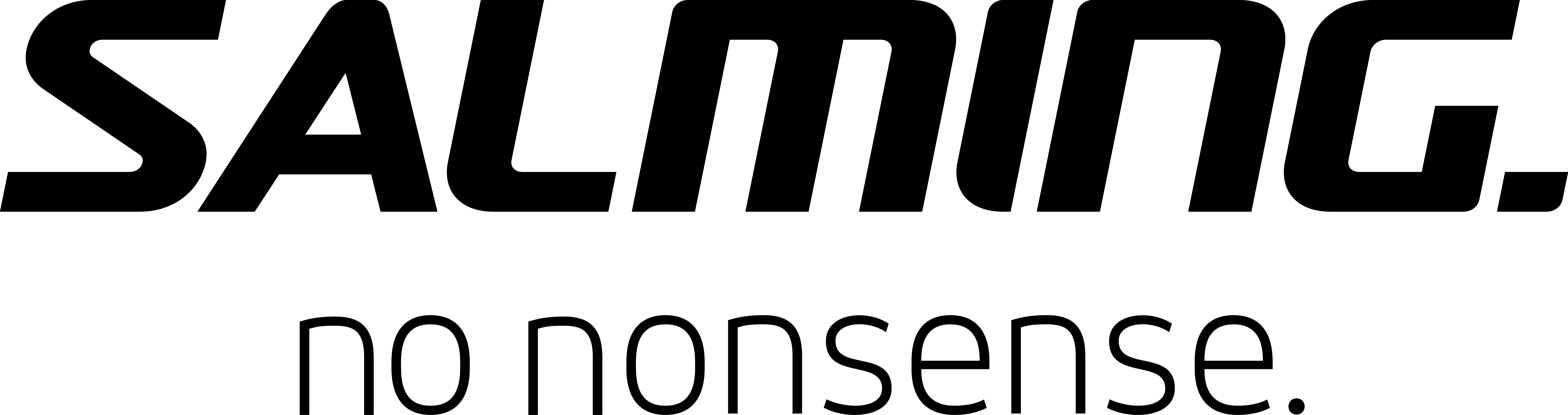
2019-

== Sports Hall information ==
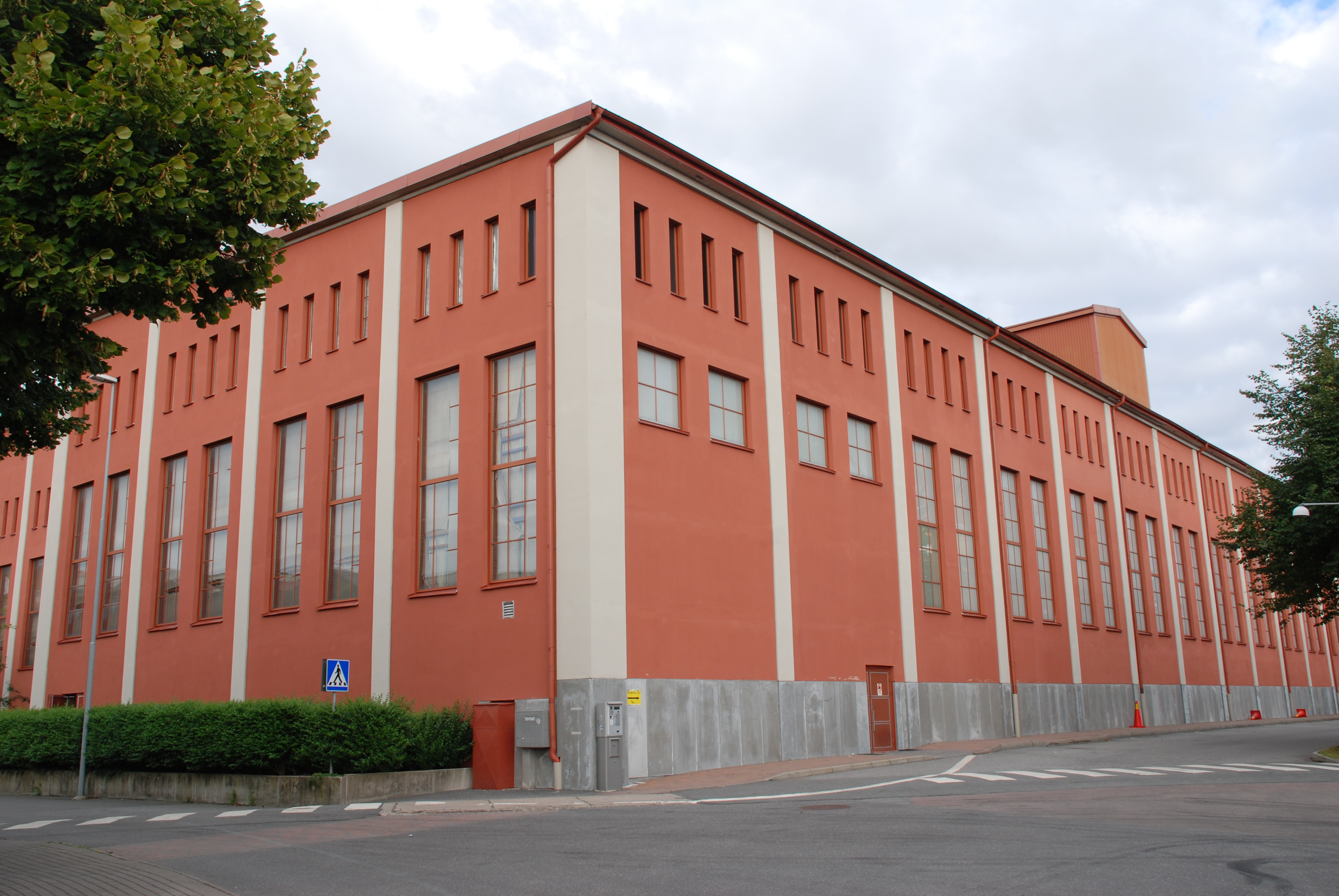
Home hall: Lundbystrand

- Name: – Lundbystrand
- City: – Gothenburg
- Capacity: – 1500
- Address: – Anders Carlssons gata 10, 417 55 Gothenburg, Sweden

== Famous former players ==
- Tommy Atterhäll
- Martin Boquist
- Per Carlén
- Martin Frändesjö
- Mia Hermansson-Högdahl
- Johan Jakobsson
- Christer Magnusson
