= Gabriela Rotiș =

Austrian-Romanian handballer (born 1980)

Personal information
- Full name: Gabriela-Eugenia Rotiș-Nagy
- Nationality: Austrian; Romanian
- Born: 12 November 1980 (age 45) Sfântu Gheorghe, Romania
- Height: 1.89 m (6 ft 2 in)

Sport
- Sport: Handball
- Position: Left Back
- Current club: Hypo Niederösterreich
- Number: 33

Senior clubs
- Years: Team
- –2002: Rulmentul Brașov
- 2002–2007: Hypo Niederösterreich
- 2007–2008: Slagelse DT
- 2008–2009: Győri ETO KC
- 2009–2011: Hypo Niederösterreich
- 2011–2014: SG Witasek Kärnten
- 2014–2016: Hypo Niederösterreich
National team
- Years: Team
- –: Romania
- –: Austria
Medal record
Junior World Championship
Gold medal – first place	1999 China	Team Romania
Junior European Championship
Gold medal – first place	1998 Slovakia	Team Romania

Gabriela-Eugenia Rotiș-Nagy (born 12 November 1980) is an Austrian-Romanian handballer who plays as a left back for Hypo Niederösterreich.

With Austria, she participated at the 2004 European Championship, the 2005 World Championship and the 2006 European Championship.

== International honours ==
- Champions League:
  - Finalist: 2009
- Cup Winners' Cup:
  - Finalist: 2004
- Champions Trophy:
  - Finalist: 2004
- Junior World Championship:
  - Winner: 1999
- Junior Handball Championship:
  - Winner: 1998
