= Jasna Kolar-Merdan =

Austrian handball player (born 1956)

Personal information
- Nationality: Austrian
- Born: 19 October 1956 (age 70) Mostar, Yugoslavia
- Height: 176 cm (69 in)

Sport
- Sport: Handball
- Position: Centre back

Senior clubs
- Years: Team
- 1974-1984: ŽRK Lokomotiva Mostar
- 1984-1993: Hypo Niederösterreich
- 1993-1994: WAT Fünfhaus
National team
Years	Team	Apps	(Gls)
1979-1984	Yugoslavia	84	(419)
1985-1992	Austria	153	(1206)

Teams managed
- 2014-2016: Union Korneuburg
Medal record
Women's Handball
Olympics
Gold medal – first place	1984 Los Angeles	Team
Silver medal – second place	1980 Moscow	Team
World Women's Handball Championship
Bronze medal – third place	1982 Hungary

Jasna Kolar-Merdan (née Jasna Merdan, (bosnian: Јасна Мердан) born 19 October 1956 in Mostar, Bosnia-Herzegovina, Yugoslavia) is a formerly Yugoslav and now Austrian former handball player, who is considered one of the best Austrian players of all time. She played for both the Yugoslavia national team and the Austria national team. She competed in the 1980 Summer Olympics, in the 1984 Summer Olympics for Yugoslavia and in the 1992 Summer Olympics for Austria.

She was voted World Handball Player of 1990 by the International Handball Federation.

She is also in the Austrian Handball Federation hall of fame.

== Career ==
Jasnar Kolar-Merdan started playing handball at her hometown club ŽRK Lokomotiva Mostar. In 1977 she helped the club get promoted to the top league in 1977. In 1983 she finished second in the Yugoslavian championship with the club.

In 1984 she joined the Austrian top club Hypo Südstadt (later called Hypo Niederösterreich). Here she won the EHF Champions League 4 times in 1989, 1990, 1992 and 1993. She also won the Austrian championship a staggering 10 times.

In 1980 she won the silver medal with the Yugoslav team, finishing behind the Soviet Union and ahead of DDR. She played all five matches and scored nine goals.

At the 1982 World Women's Handball Championship she achieved bronze medals with the Yugaslav team. She was the topscorer of the tournament with 52 goals.

Four years in Los Angeles she won the gold medal as member of the Yugoslav team. She played all five matches and scored 48 goals. She was the top scorer of the tournament. At that tournament she also established the record for most goals in a single match at the Olympics, when she scored 17 goals in a 33:20 win over USA. Due to the Soviet and East german boykot, Yugoslavia was the pre-tournament favourites at the tournament.

In 1985 she achieved Austrian citizenship. She then switched to playing for the Austrian national team from 1985 onwards. Her first tournament with the Austrian team was the 1986 World Championship, where Austria finish 12th.

In 1992 with the Austrian team this team, she played in the Olympic tournament, where Austria finished 5th. She played all four matches and scored 23 goals. In total she scored 1206 goals for the Austrian national team, which is a national record.

In 1993 she joined the Vienna based club WAT Fünfhaus where she played for a single season, before ending her career.

== Post-playing career ==
From 1994 she has had a café in Maria Enzersdorf together with her husband.

In 2014 she became the coach of the Austrian club Union Korneuburg.

== Honours ==
- Olympics 1984: Gold medals
- Olympics 1980: Silver medals
- World Championship 1982: Bronze medals
- EHF Champions League: 1989, 1990, 1992, 1993
- Austrian Championship: 10× (1984/85–1992/93)
- Austrian Cup: 4× (1990–1993)
- Yugoslav Championship: 2nd place (1983)

== See also ==
- List of women's handballers with 1000 or more international goals

Awards
Preceded by Kim Hyun-Mee	IHF World Player of the Year – Women; 1990	Suspended Title next held by Mia Hermansson-Högdahl
