= Kristian Meldgaard =

Danish handball player (born 1983)

Personal information
- Full name: Kristian Meldgaard
- Nationality: Danish (Denmark)
- Born: 3 September 1983 (age 43) Ikast, Denmark
- Height: 190 cm (75 in)

Sport
- Sport: Handball
- Position: Left Back
- Current club: Retired

Senior clubs
- Years: Team
- -2004: Ikast Håndbold
- 2004-2007: FCK Håndbold
- 2007-2009: TMS Ringsted
- 2009-2010: Ajax København

Kristian Meldgaard (born 3 September 1983) is a Danish former handballer.

He started his handball career at his hometown club Ikast Håndbold. He then joined FCK Håndbold in 2004. He extended his contract for one more year in 2006. At FC Copenhagen he did not see a lot of playing time due to competition from Morten Krampau, Arnór Atlason and Martin Boquist.

He joined TMS Ringsted on a two-year deal in 2007.

In 2009 he joined Ajax København in the 1st Division, the second tier of Danish handball. A year later he was forced to retired at the age of 26 due to a jumper's knee injury.
