= Mariana Tîrcă =

Romanian handball player (born 1962)

Personal information
- Full name: Mariana Tîrcă
- Nationality: Romanian
- Born: 9 October 1962 (age 64) Mândra, Romania

Sport
- Sport: Handball
- Position: Right back
- Current club: Retired

Senior clubs
- Years: Team
- 1980–1984: (Romania) Rulmentul Brașov
- 1984–1988: (Romania) Știința Bacău
- 1988–1992: (Romania) Oltchim Râmnicu Vâlcea
- 1992–1999: (Croatia) Podravka Koprivnica
- 1999–2000: (Greece) GAS Anagennisi Artas
National team
Years	Team	Apps	(Gls)
–	Romania	335	(2043)

Teams managed
- 2000–2004: (Romania) Oltchim Râmnicu Vâlcea
- 2004–2008: (Romania) Rulmentul Brașov
- 2010–2013: (Romania) Corona Brașov
- 2016–2017: (Romania) Corona Brașov
- Updated on 23 June 2011

Mariana Tîrcă (born 9 October 1962) is a retired Romanian handball player. She is considered a living legend of the Romanian and international handball, being voted top 5 women handball players of the 20th century.

She has played 335 games for the Romanian national team, and scored 2043 goals. Tîrcă played until the age of 41, and is currently the player with most goals for any handball national team in the world regardless of gender.

== International honours ==
Player

- Champions League: Winner 1996 (with Podravka Koprivnica)
- Champions Trophy: Winner 1996 (with Podravka Koprivnica)

Coach

- Romanian League: Winner 2006 (with Rulmentul Braşov)
- Challenge Cup: Winner 2006 (with Rulmentul Braşov)
- Cup Winners' Cup: Runner-up 2008 (with Rulmentul Braşov)

== Personal life ==
Mariana Tîrcă is an honorary citizen of Croatia.

She is married with Sorin Tîrcă and has one daughter, Sorina.

== See also ==
- List of women's handballers with 1000 or more international goals
