= Erzsébet Kocsis =

Hungarian handball player (born 1965)

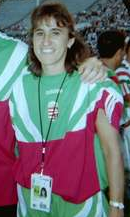
- Kocsis in 1996

Personal information
- Full name: Erzsébet Sáriné Kocsis
- Nationality: Hungarian
- Born: 11 March 1965 (age 61) Győr, Hungary
- Height: 1.70 m (5 ft 7 in)

Sport
- Sport: Handball
- Position: line player

Senior clubs
- Years: Team
- 1982–1989: Győri Richards
- 1989–1999: Dunaújváros
- 1999–2000: Kiskőrösi KC
- 2009: Dunaújváros
National team
Years	Team	Apps	(Gls)
1986–1996	Hungary	125	(328)
Medal record
Olympic Games
Bronze medal – third place	1996 Atlanta	Team
World Championship
Silver medal – second place	1995 Austria Hungary	Team

Erzsébet Kocsis (born 11 March 1965) is a Hungarian former handball player and the current technical director of Dunaújvárosi NKS. She was voted IHF World Player of the Year in 1995 by the International Handball Federation.

She won 125 caps for the Hungarian national team between 1986 and 1996, and received a bronze medal at the 1996 Summer Olympics and a silver medal at the 1995 World Championship.

At club level, she won all three major continental titles with Dunaújváros. First in 1995 the EHF Cup Winners' Cup, four years later the EHF Cup, and in 1999 the EHF Champions League. She gave up professional handball in 2000, however, following her former team lost most of their players due to financial problems, she returned into action in 2009, helping Dunaújváros to avoid relegation.

She is married to Árpád Sári, a former handballer. Their daughter, Barbara Sári is also a professional handball player.

== Achievements ==
=== Club ===
- Nemzeti Bajnokság I:
  - Winner: 1998, 1999
- Magyar Kupa:
  - Winner: 1998, 1999
- EHF Champions League:
  - Winner: 1999
- EHF Cup:
  - Winner: 1998
- EHF Cup Winners' Cup:
  - Winner: 1995
- EHF Champions Trophy:
  - Winners: 1999
  - Third Placed: 1998
  - Fourth Placed: 1995

=== International ===
- Olympic Games:
  - Bronze Medalist: 1996
- World Championship:
  - Silver Medalist: 1995

== Awards and recognition ==
- Nemzeti Bajnokság I Top Scorer: 1993
- Hungarian Handballer of the Year: 1992, 1994
- IHF World Player of the Year: 1995

Awards
Preceded by Mia Hermansson	IHF World Player of the Year – Women; 1995	Succeeded by Lim O-Kyeong
