= Anita Kulcsár =

Hungarian handball player (1976-2005)

Personal information
- Full name: Anita Kulcsár
- Nationality: Hungarian
- Born: 2 October 1976 Szerencs, Hungary
- Died: 19 January 2005 (aged 28) between Pusztaszabolcs and Velence, Hungary
- Height: 1.78 m (5 ft 10 in)

Sport
- Sport: Handball
- Position: Line Player

Senior clubs
- Years: Team
- –1995: Kölcsey DSE
- 1995–2001: Győri ETO KC
- 2001–2004: Alcoa FKC
- 2004–2005: Dunaferr NK
National team
Years	Team	Apps	(Gls)
1996–2005	Hungary	165	(402)
Medal record
Olympic Games
Silver medal – second place	2000 Sydney	Team
World Championship
Silver medal – second place	2003 Croatia	Team
European Championship
Gold medal – first place	2000 Romania	Team
Bronze medal – third place	1998 Netherlands	Team
Bronze medal – third place	2004 Hungary	Team

Anita Kulcsár (2 October 1976 – 19 January 2005) was a Hungarian handball player. She was voted IHF World Player of the Year in 2004 by the International Handball Federation.

== Life ==
She began her handball career with Nyíregyházi Kölcsey and later played for Győri Graboplast ETO, Cornexi-Alcoa and Dunaferr NK.

She died in a car accident on 19 January 2005, at the age of 28; according to the police report, she was driving from Sukoró to Dunaújváros for team practice when her car slid off the road and hit a tree. Since her death, the city of Dunaújváros organizes the Anita Kulcsár Memorial Tournament in her honor every year.

== Achievements ==
- Nemzeti Bajnokság I:
  - Winner: 2004
  - Silver Medalist: 1998, 2000
  - Bronze Medalist: 1999, 2001
- Magyar Kupa:
  - Winner: 2004
  - Silver Medalist: 2000
- EHF Cup:
  - Finalist: 1999
- Olympic Games:
  - Silver Medalist: 2000
- European Championship:
  - Winner: 2000
  - Bronze Medalist: 1998, 2004
- World Championship:
  - Silver Medalist: 2003

== Awards and recognition ==
- IHF World Player of the Year: 2004

Awards
Preceded by Bojana Radulovics	IHF World Player of the Year – Women; 2004	Succeeded by Anita Görbicz
