= Lim O-kyeong =

South Korean handball player and politician (born 1971)

- 임오경
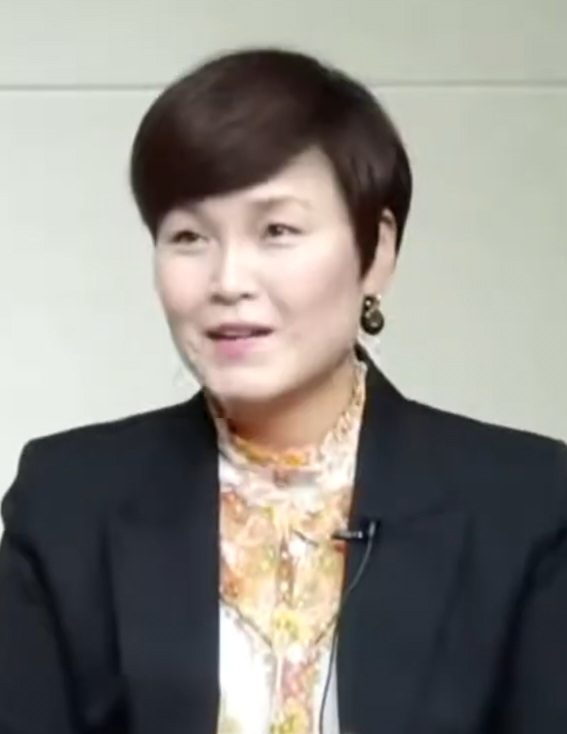

Member of the National Assembly
- Incumbent
- Assumed office 30 May 2020
- Preceded by: Baek Jae-hyun
- Constituency: Gyeonggi Gwangmyeong A

Personal details
- Born: 11 December 1971 (age 54) Jeongeup, South Korea
- Party: Democratic
- Education: Korea National Sport University

Olympic medal record

Women's handball

Representing South Korea
| Gold medal – first place | 1992 Barcelona | Team |
| Silver medal – second place | 1996 Atlanta | Team |
| Silver medal – second place | 2004 Athens | Team |

World Championship
| Gold medal – first place | 1995 Austria/Hungary | |

Lim O-Kyeong (Korean: 임오경; Hanja: 林五卿; born 11 December 1971), also spelled as Im Oh-Gyeong, is a South Korean politician who previously was handball player who won the World Championship and competed in three Olympics.

== Sports and Education ==
At the 1992 Summer Olympics in Barcelona, she was part of the South Korea national team which won the gold medal. She played all five matches and scored 30 goals.

In 1994 she moved to Japan to play for the Hiroshima Maple Reds. In 1996 she became a player-manager and led her team to a Japan Handball League championship.

In 1995 she was part of the South Korea team that won the 1995 World Championship. This was the first time a non-European team won the title, and as of 2026 the only Asian team to do so. She was named as part of the all-star team for the tournament.

At the 1996 Summer Olympics in Atlanta, she won the silver medal as member of the South Korean team. She played all five matches and scored 41 goals.

Lim was voted World Handball Player of the Year 1996 by the International Handball Federation.

In 2004, she won the silver medal again at the Athens Olympics, losing to Denmark in the final on a penalty shoot out. At the competition she played all seven matches and scored 14 goals.

In July 2008 she was hired as Seoul City Hall Handball Club's player-manager becoming the first woman to coach a professional Ball game team in South Korea.

She completed her tertiary education at Korea National Sport University in Seoul for undergraduate, master's and doctorate degrees.

== Politics ==
She previously served as a Korean Sport & Olympic Committee board member and as a non-executive director of the government-funded Korea Sports Promotion Foundation.

In preparation for the 2020 general election, she was approached and recruited by the ruling Democratic Party. She stated that her decision to join the political party was inspired by President Moon Jae-in.

== Electoral history ==
| Election | Year | District | Party affiliation | Votes | Percentage of votes | Results |
|---|---|---|---|---|---|---|
| 21st National Assembly General Election | 2020 | Gyeonggi Gwangmyeong A | Democratic Party | 43,019 | 47.66% | Won |
| 22nd National Assembly General Election | 2024 | Gyeonggi Gwangmyeong A | Democratic Party | 47,716 | 58.73% | Won |

== Awards ==
- Order of Sports Merit by the government of South Korea (1992)
- IHF World Player of the Year 1996

Awards
| Preceded by Erzsébet Kocsis | IHF World Player of the Year – Women; 1996 | Succeeded by Anja Andersen |
