= WAT Atzgersdorf =

Handball club from Atzgersdorf, Austria

- Full name: WAT Atzgersdorf
- Founded: 1912; 114 years ago
- Arena: Hans Lackner Sporthalle
- Capacity: 520
- President: Christian Mahr
- Head coach: Danijel Miloradovic
- League: Women Handball Liga Austria
- 2022–23: 2nd
- Club colours
Home	Away

Location of WAT Atzgersdorf

WAT Atzgersdorf is a handball club from Atzgersdorf, a suburb to Vienna in Austria. They are currently competing in the Women Handball Liga Austria in the 2023–24 season.

In 2019, they won the Women Handball Liga Austria for the first time in the club's history. They beat 42nd time-champion Hypo Niederösterreich in the finals, after finishing 2nd in the regular season. This was the first time since 1972 that a team other than Hypo NÖ had won the title.

== Honours ==
- Women Handball Austria:
  - Winners (1): 2019
  - Runners-up (3): 2020, 2021, 2022, 2023
- ÖHB Cup:
  - Runners-up (2): 2020, 2021, 2023

== Team ==
=== Current squad ===
Squad for the 2023–24 season

Goalkeepers

- 1 (Serbia) Nina Kolundžić
- 16 (Austria) Marina Malkic
- 21 (Croatia) Nicole Ivkić

Wingers
RW

- 19 (Austria) Lilli Gschwentner
- 46 (Austria) Lisa Pöschl

LW

- 3 (Austria) Mirijam Steyrer
- 11 (Austria) Ines Lovric
- 12 (Austria) Laura Grießler
- 28 (Austria) Julia Etzenberger

Line Players

- 9 (Austria) Anastasija Tomic
- 13 (Austria) Karla Barnjak
- 81 (Germany) Alina Bohnen

Back players
LB

- 32 (Croatia) Antonela Dramac
- 33 (Serbia) Iva Momcilović
- 44 (Serbia) Tina Kolundžić
- 94 (Hungary) Krisztina Bárány

CB

- 4 (Austria) Hena Gojacic
- 10 (Austria) Luca Tesche
- 20 (Austria) Djellza Hetemaj
- 96 (Austria) Tina Lauter

RB

- 14 (Austria) Sara Mustedanagic

=== Transfers ===
Transfers for the 2024-25 season

Joining

Leaving

== Team ==
=== Current squad ===
Squad for the 2026–27 season

Goalkeepers
Left Wingers

- (Austria) Lorin Lichtblau

Right Wingers

- (Austria) Felix Irlacher

Line players

Left Backs
Central Backs
Right Backs

- (Austria) Julian Schiffleitner

=== Transfers ===
Transfers for the 2026–27 season

Joining

- (Austria) Julian Schiffleitner (RB) from (Austria) BT Füchse
- (Austria) Felix Irlacher (RW) from (Austria) UHC Hollabrunn
- (Austria) Lorin Lichtblau (LW) from (Austria) Handballclub Fivers Margareten

Leaving
