= Trine Haltvik =

Norwegian handball player (born 1965)

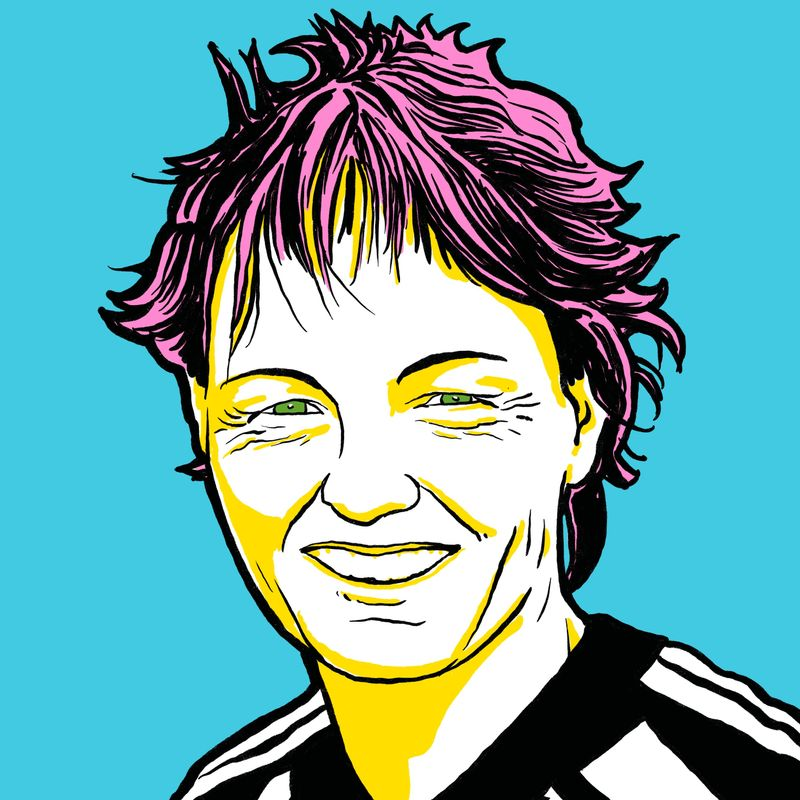

Personal information
- Nationality: Norwegian
- Born: 23 March 1965 (age 61) Trondheim, Norway
- Height: 1.72 m (5 ft 8 in)

Sport
- Sport: Handball
- Position: Back

Senior clubs
- Years: Team
- 1981–1999: Byåsen IL
- 1999–2000: Remudas Gran Canaria
- 2000–2006: Byåsen IL
- 2010–2012: Selbu IL
National team
Years	Team	Apps	(Gls)
1984–2000	Norway	241	(834)

Teams managed
- –: Norway U17
- 2012–: Selbu IL
Medal record
Olympic Games
Silver medal – second place	1988 Seoul	Team
Bronze medal – third place	2000 Sydney	Team
World Championship
Gold medal – first place	1999 Denmark/Norway
Silver medal – second place	1997 Germany
Bronze medal – third place	1986 Netherlands
European Championship
Gold medal – first place	1998 Netherlands
Silver medal – second place	1996 Denmark

Trine Haltvik (born 23 March 1965) is a Norwegian handball coach and former player. Currently she is coach for the |Norwegian girls' under-17 team. She was voted World Player of the Year 1998 by the International Handball Federation. Her loyalty to Byåsen IL and relative old age for a professional athlete, has given her the nickname "Mor" or Mother.

== Career ==
Haltvik started her handball career at just 16 for Byåsen IL. Here she won the Norwegian Championship 5 times. She played for Byåsen her entire career with the exception of a year playing for Remudas Gran Canaria in Spain. she retired in 2006 after she had become a mother for a third time.

In October 2010 she made a comeback for Selbu IL, where she played with her oldest daughter Katinka. In March 2011 she retired again, but for the 2011–12 season she made a second comeback at the age of 46.

She has played in 241 games for the Norwegian national team, scoring 834 goals. She won gold medals at the 1998 European Women's Handball Championship and the 1999 World Women's Handball Championship. She represented Norway at three Olympics, in 1988, 1996 and 2000, winning a silver medal in 1988 and a bronze medal in 2000.

== Coaching career ==
While still playing she became a coach at the Norwegian girls' under-17 team. In 2012 she became the head coach of Selbu IL.

Awards
Preceded by Anja Andersen	IHF World Player of the Year – Women; 1998	Succeeded by Ausra Fridrikas
