= Mia Hermansson-Högdahl =

Swedish handball player (born 1965)

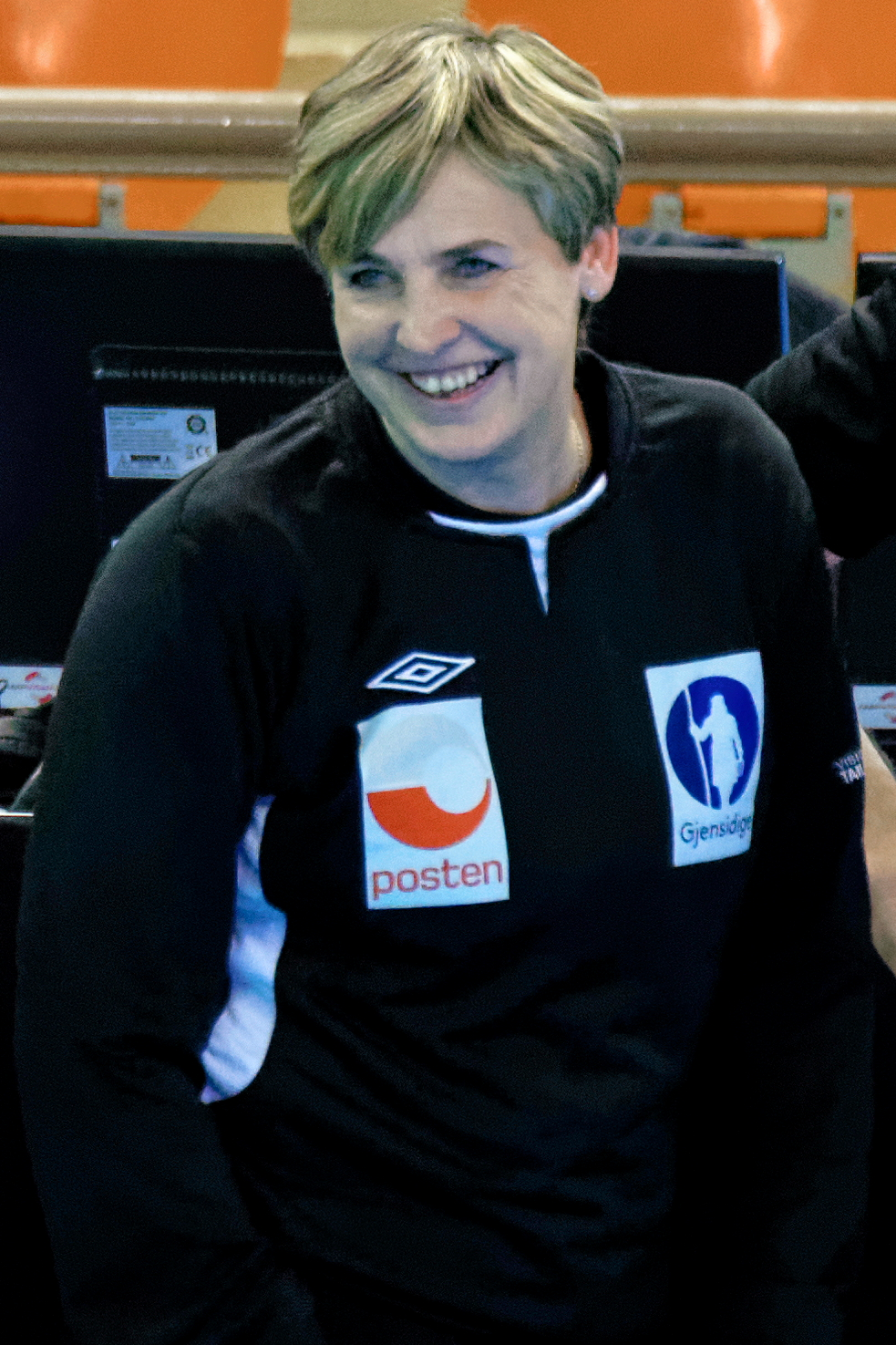
- Mia Hermansson-Högdahl (2015)

Personal information
- Nationality: Swedish
- Born: 6 May 1965 (age 61) Gothenburg, Sweden
- Height: 171 cm (67 in)

Sport
- Sport: Handball
- Position: Right back

Senior clubs
- Years: Team
- –1985: HP Warta
- 1985–1987: Tyresö HF
- 1987–1992: Byåsen IL
- 1992–1996: Hypo Niederösterreich
- 1996–1999: Byåsen IL
- 1999–2000: Milar L'Eliana Valencia
National team
| Years | Team | Apps | (Gls) |
| 1984–1998 | Sweden | 225 | (1153) |

Teams managed
- 2003-2008: Levanger HK assistant coach
- 2009-2020: Norway (women) assistant coach

Mia Hermansson-Högdahl (born 6 May 1965) is a Swedish handball player and handball coach. She was voted World Handball Player of the Year 1994 by the International Handball Federation. She is seen as one of the best Swedish players of all time.

Hermansson-Högdahl has played 222 matches for the Sweden national team, and scored 1100 times. giving her the distinction of being the current highest scoring Sweden national team player. She was voted into the World team in 1987, 1991 and 1994. As a club player she won the Women's EHF Champions League twice (1993/94, 1994/95), with Hypo Niederösterreich.

As Swedish handballer of the year for three times (1984/85, 1986/87 and 1993/94), she held the distinction of highest number of times until Isabelle Gulldén matched her in 2018. She was inducted into the EHF Hall of Fame in 2024.

== Playing career ==
Mia Hermansson-Högdahl began playing handball at HP Warta when she was 10 years old, as a goalkeeper.

While playing for HP Warta she debuted for the senior Sweden national team in 1984. In 1985 she was the top scorer in the Swedish league with 112 goals in 18 matches.

In summer 1985, she joined Tyresö HF, where she became Swedish champion and league top scorer for a second time with 103 goals in 18 matches. She then joined Norwegian side Byåsen IL in 1987, where she became a professional player. Here she won the Norwegian Championship twice in 1988 and 1990.

In 1992 she joined one of the best teams in Europe in the Austrian Hypo Niederösterreich. Here she won the Austrian championship and cup double 4 times as well as the EHF Champions League two times, in 1994 and 1995.

In 1996 she returned to Norway and Byåsen, where she won another Norwegian title, then played a single year at Spain's BM Sagunto before retiring.

== Coaching career ==
From 2003 to 2008 she was the assistant coach of the Norwegian top league team Levanger HK. She was the assistant coach of the team Norway from 2009 to 2020.

== Private life ==
She is married to the Swedish handball coach Arne Högdahl, who coached Hypo Niederösterreich. Their daughter, Moa Högdahl is also a professional handballer, playing for Nykøbing Falster Håndboldklub and the team Norway.

She is the sister-in-law of former handball player Lena Högdahl.

== See also ==
- List of women's handballers with 1000 or more international goals

Awards
| Suspended Title last held by Jasna Kolar-Merdan | IHF World Player of the Year – Women; 1994 | Succeeded by Erzsébet Kocsis |
