= Petra Blazek =

Austrian handball player (born 1987)

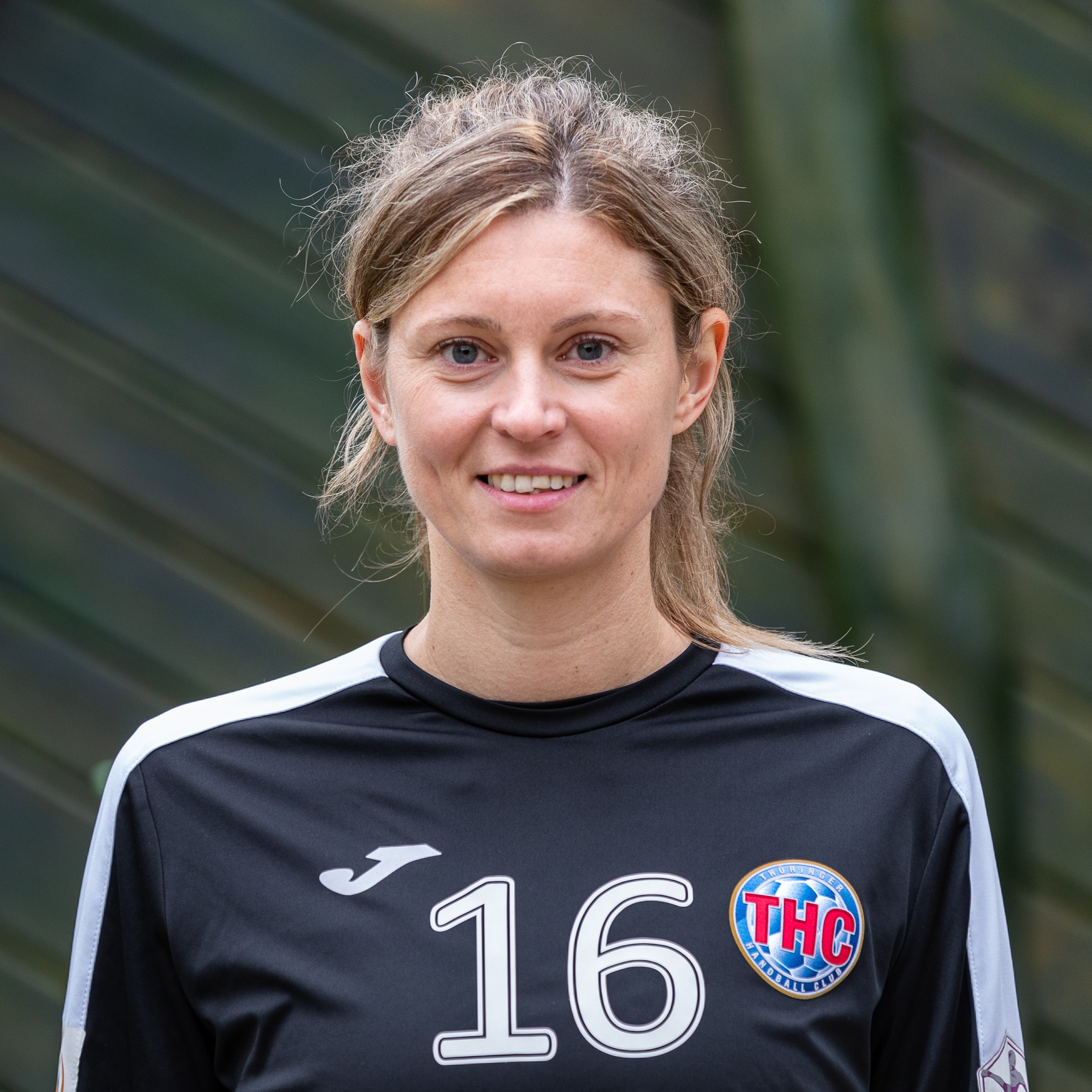

Personal information
- Nationality: Austrian
- Born: 15 June 1987 (age 39) Mödling, Austria
- Height: 1.82 m (6 ft 0 in)

Sport
- Sport: Handball
- Position: Goalkeeper
- Current club: Hypo Niederösterreich

Senior clubs
- Years: Team
- –2013: Hypo Niederösterreich
- 2013–2014: US Mios-Biganos Handball
- 2014–2015: MTK Budapest
- 2015–2016: Molde Elite
- 2016–2019: SCM Râmnicu Vâlcea
- 2019–2020: Gloria Buzău
- 2020–2022: Thüringer HC
- 2022–: Hypo Niederösterreich
National team
Years	Team	Apps	(Gls)
2004–	Austria	236	(4)
- Updated on 6 november 2024

Petra Blazek (born 15 June 1987) is an Austrian handballer who plays for Hypo NÖ and the Austrian national team.

== International honours ==
- EHF Champions League:
  - Finalist: 2008
- EHF Cup Winners' Cup:
  - Winner: 2013
