= List of national handball teams =

This is a list of men's national handball teams in the world.

== AHF (Asia) ==
- Afghanistan
- Bahrain
- Bangladesh
- China
- Chinese Taipei
- Hong Kong
- India
- Iran
- Iraq
- Japan
- Jordan
- Kazakhstan
- Kuwait
- Kyrgyzstan
- Lebanon
- Macau
- Malaysia
- Mongolia
- Nepal
- North Korea
- Oman
- Pakistan
- Palestine
- Philippines
- Qatar
- Saudi Arabia
- South Korea
- Syria
- Tajikistan
- Thailand
- Turkmenistan
- United Arab Emirates
- Uzbekistan
- Vietnam
- Yemen

== CAHB (Africa) ==
- Algeria
- Angola
- Benin
- Burkina Faso
- Burundi
- Cameroon
- Cape Verde
- Central African Republic
- Chad
- Comoros
- Congo
- Djibouti
- DR Congo
- Egypt
- Ethiopia
- Gabon
- Gambia
- Guinea
- Guinea-Bissau
- Ivory Coast
- Kenya
- Lesotho
- Liberia
- Libya
- Madagascar
- Malawi
- Mauritania
- Mauritius
- Morocco
- Mozambique
- Namibia
- Niger
- Nigeria
- Rwanda
- São Tomé and Príncipe
- Senegal
- Seychelles
- Sierra Leone
- Somalia
- South Africa
- South Sudan
- Sudan
- Tanzania
- Togo
- Tunisia
- Uganda
- Zambia
- Zimbabwe

== EHF (Europe) ==
- Albania
- Armenia
- Austria
- Azerbaijan
- Belarus
- Belgium
- Bosnia and Herzegovina
- Bulgaria
- Croatia
- Cyprus
- Czech Republic
- Denmark
- England
- Estonia
- Faroe Islands
- Finland
- France
- Georgia
- Germany
- Great Britain (special member)
- Greece
- Hungary
- Iceland
- Ireland
- Israel
- Italy
- Kosovo
- Latvia
- Liechtenstein
- Lithuania
- Luxembourg
- Malta
- Moldova
- Monaco
- Montenegro
- Netherlands
- North Macedonia
- Norway
- Poland
- Portugal
- Romania
- Russia
- Scotland
- Serbia
- Slovakia
- Slovenia
- Spain
- Sweden
- Switzerland
- Turkey
- Ukraine

== OCHF (Oceania) ==
- Australia
- Cook Islands
- Fiji
- New Zealand
- Papua New Guinea
- Samoa
- Solomon Islands
- Tonga
- Vanuatu

== PATHF (Pan-America) ==
- Argentina
- Bahamas
- Barbados
- Belize
- Bolivia
- Brazil
- Canada
- Chile
- Colombia
- Costa Rica
- Cuba
- Dominican Republic
- Ecuador
- El Salvador
- Greenland
- Guatemala
- Guyana
- Haiti
- Honduras
- Jamaica
- Mexico
- Nicaragua
- Panama
- Paraguay
- Peru
- Puerto Rico
- Suriname
- Trinidad and Tobago
- United States
- Uruguay
- Venezuela

== See also ==
- List of member federations at IHF's site
