= Kulcsár Anita-emléktorna =

The Kulcsár Anita-emléktorna (English: Anita Kulcsár Memorial Tournament) was an annual handball tournament, which took place in Dunaújváros in August or September between 2005 and 2011. It was organized in the honor of former Hungarian international handball player Anita Kulcsár, who died in a car accident in 2005.

== Tournament structure ==
The tournament usually had two Hungarian teams play against two top teams from other countries. In 2007 six teams participated in the event, while in 2009 a single match decided the winner of the tournament, in which Győri Audi ETO KC beat CS Oltchim Râmnicu Vâlcea.

== Summary ==
Year
Year	Winner	Second	Third	Fourth	Fifth	Sixth
2005; Details	(Hungary); Győri Graboplast ETO	(Hungary); Dunaferr NK	(Serbia and Montenegro); Budućnost Podgorica	(Croatia); Podravka Koprivnica
2006; Details	(Hungary); Dunaferr NK	(Hungary); Győri Audi ETO KC	(Austria); Hypo NÖ	(Ukraine); Karpaty Uzhhorod
2007; Details	(Hungary); Győri Audi ETO KC	(Hungary); Dunaferr NK	(Hungary); Budapest Bank-FTC	(Hungary); Cornexi-Alcoa Auto-Bahn	(Russia); HC Lada	(Montenegro); Buducnost MONET Podgorica
2008; Details	(Hungary); Győri Audi ETO KC	(Hungary); Dunaferr NK	(Romania); Oltchim Rm. Vâlcea	(Russia); HC Lada
2009; Details	(Hungary); Győri Audi ETO KC	(Romania); Oltchim Rm. Vâlcea
2010; Details	(Hungary); Győri Audi ETO KC	(Slovenia); RK Krim Ljubljana	(Montenegro); ŽRK Budućnost T-Mobile	(Hungary); Dunaújvárosi NKKSE
2011; Details	(Hungary); Győri Audi ETO KC	(Norway); Larvik HK	(Hungary); FTC-Rail Cargo Hungaria	(Denmark); FC Midtjylland Håndbold

== See also ==
- Szabella-kupa
