= Olga Sanko =

Russian handball player

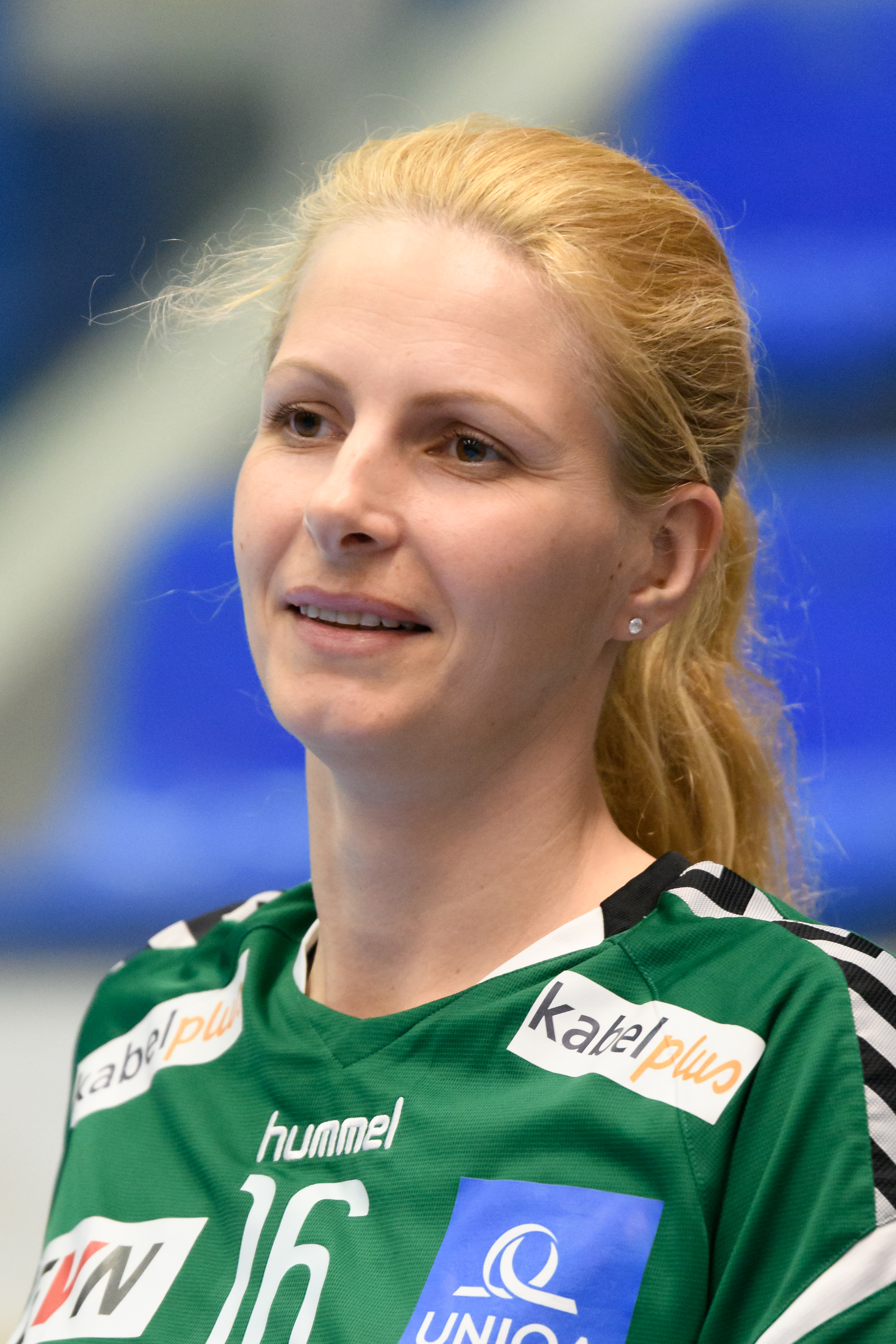

Personal information
- Nationality: Russian
- Born: 28 February 1978 (age 48) Rostov, Russia
- Height: 1.80 m (5 ft 11 in)

Sport
- Sport: Handball
- Position: Goalkeeper
- Current club: Hypo Niederösterreich
- Number: 16

Senior clubs
- Years: Team
- 2002-2004: Rostov-Don
- 2003-2007: Hypo Niederösterreich
- 2007-2009: Zvezda Zvenigorod
- 2009-2019: Hypo Niederösterreich

Olga Sanko (born 28 February 1978) is a retired Russian handball player. She last played for Hypo Niederösterreich in Austria, from 2009 to 2019.
