= Svetlana Ognjenović =

Serbian handball player (born 1981)

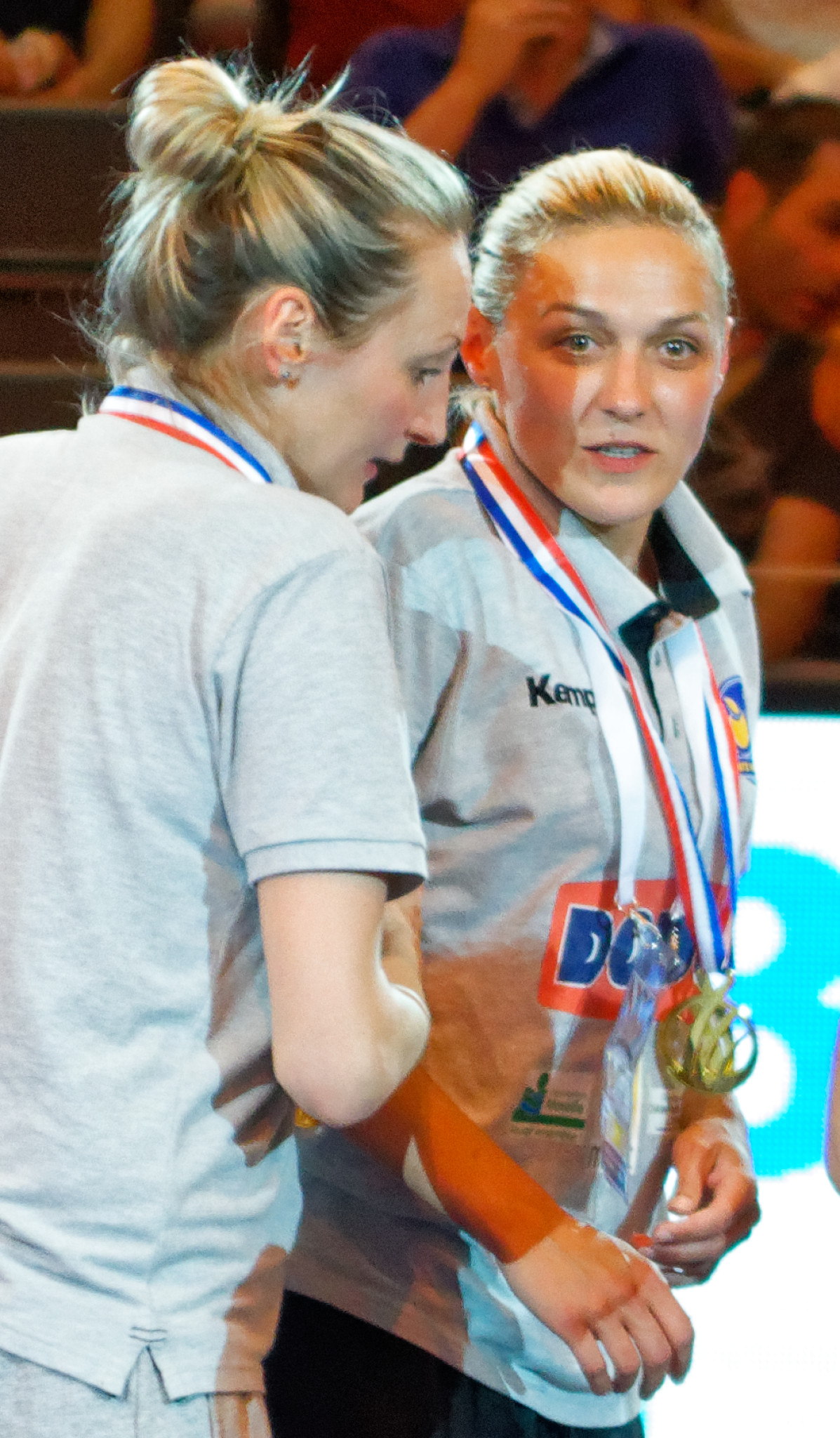
- Svetlana Ognjenovic in 2017

Personal information
- Nationality: Serbian
- Born: 26 January 1981 (age 45) Osijek, SR Croatia, SFR Yugoslavia
- Height: 1.68 m (5 ft 6 in)

Sport
- Sport: Handball
- Position: Left wing
- Current club: Metz Handball
- Number: 21

Senior clubs
- Years: Team
- 2001–2004: ŽRK Radnički Belgrade
- 2004–2005: ŽRK Knjaz Miloš
- 2005–2007: HC Naisa Niš
- 2007–2008: Slagelse FH
- 2008–2014: Metz
National team
Years	Team	Apps	(Gls)
–	Serbia	87	(200)
Medal record
Women's Handball
Representing Serbia
World Championship
Silver medal – second place	2013 Serbia	Team competition
Representing Serbia and Montenegro
Mediterranean Games
Silver medal – second place	2005 Almería	Team

Svetlana Ognjenović (Serbian Cyrillic: Светлана Огњеновић; born 26 January 1981) is a Serbian handball player. She is a member of the Serbian national team.

== Career ==
Ognjenović started at ŽRK Radnički Belgrade, and went on to play for ŽRK Knjaz Miloš and HC Naisa Niš in her home country. In 2007 she became Serbian champion.

She then went on to play for Danish side Slagelse FH, where she played for single year before moving to French Metz Handball. Here she won the French championship in 2009, 2011, 2013 and 2014, the French Cup in 2010 and 2013, and the French league cup in 2009, 2010 and 2011. In 2013 she reached the final of the EHF Cup, but lost to Danish Team Tvis Holstebro.

She retired after the 2013/14 season.

=== Prokop controversy ===
In 2009 in a Champions League match against Austrian Hypo Niederösterreich, the opposition coach, Gunnar Prokop, decided to invade the field and tackle Svetlana Ognjenović with 7 seconds remaining of the match. The score at the time was 27-27, and Prokop prevented a counterattack, that potentially could win the match.

Prokop would be banned from all handball activities for 1 year, received a 10.000 euro fine and Hypo NÖ had 1 point detracted.
