= Boqvist =

Boqvist is a surname of Swedish origin. Notable people with the surname include:

- Adam Boqvist (born 2000), Swedish professional ice hockey defenceman
- Jesper Boqvist (born 1998), Swedish professional ice hockey centre
- Lina Boqvist (born 1991), Swedish professional golfer

== See also ==
- Boquist
