= Tajikistan men's national handball team =

Tajikistan

Information
- Association: Tajikistan Handball Association

Colours
1st	2nd

Results

Asian Championship
- Appearances: none (First in n/a)
- Best result: n/a
- Last updated on Unknown.

The Tajikistan national handball team is the national handball team of Tajikistan and is controlled by the Tajikistan Handball Association.

The Team is yet to compete in any major tournaments. However the team plays friendly matches mostly against Afghanistan and teams from Central Asia.

== Tournament record ==
=== Asian Championship ===
- Yet to participate.

=== Asian Games ===
- Yet to participate.

=== Other Tournaments ===
- 2011 Afghanistan International Handball Tournament in Kabul: 3rd place
- 2012 Challenge Trophy International Handball Tournament in Samarkand: 3rd place
- 2015 Handball Friendship Cup in Kabul: ?
