= József Kulcsár =

Hungarian politician

Member of the National Assembly
- In office 14 May 2010 – 5 May 2014

Personal details
- Born: 1954 (age 71–72) Budapest, Hungary
- Party: Fidesz
- Children: 2
- Profession: politician

József Ferenc Kulcsár (born 1954) is a Hungarian politician, member of the National Assembly (MP) for Zugló (Budapest Constituency XXII) from 2010 to 2014. He was a member of the Defence and Internal Security Committee since 17 May 2010.

== Personal life ==
He is married and has two children.
