= Kim Hyun-mee (handballer) =

South Korean handball player (born 1967)

Personal information
- Born: September 20, 1967 (age 59)
- Height: 166 cm (65 in)

Sport
- Sport: Handball
- Position: Back
National team
- Years: Team
- 1986-1988: South Korea
Medal record
Representing South Korea
Women's handball
Olympic Games
Gold medal – first place	1988 Seoul	Team

Korean name
- Hangul: 김현미
- RR: Gim Hyeonmi
- MR: Kim Hyŏnmi

Kim Hyun-mee (Korean: 김현미; born September 20, 1967), also spelled Kim Hyun-mi or Kim Hyeon-mi, is a South Korean team handball player. She competed at the 1988 Summer Olympics and won a gold medal with the South Korean team, ahead of Norway and the Soviet Union.

She was voted World Handball Player of the Year 1989 by the International Handball Federation.

She also participated in the 1986 World Women's Handball Championship in the Netherlands, where South Korea finished 11th of 16.

Awards
Preceded by Svetlana Dašić-Kitić	IHF World Player of the Year – Women; 1989	Succeeded by Jasna Kolar-Merdan
