= Liese Prokop =

Austrian pentathlete (1941–2006)

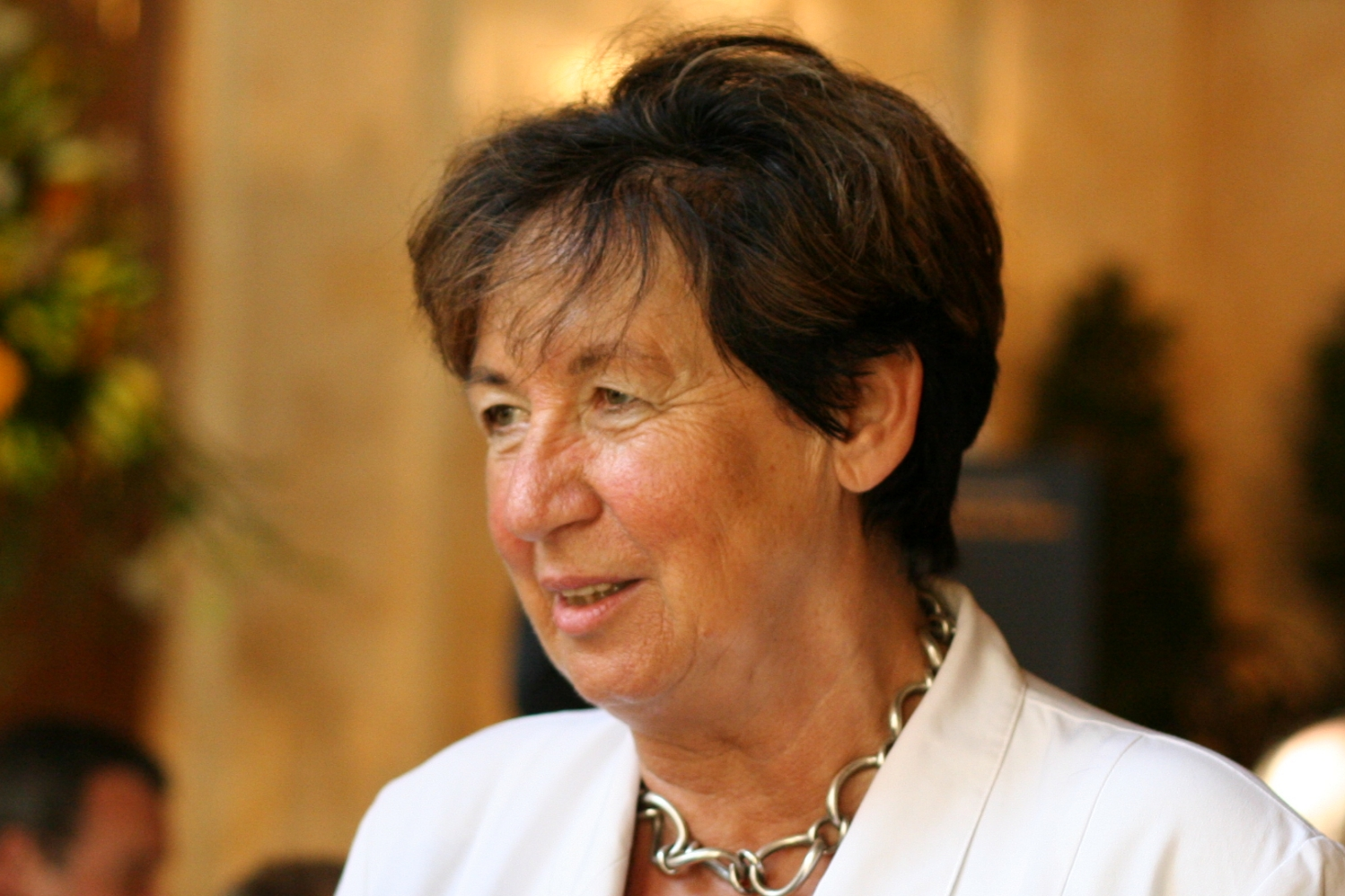
- Foto: June, 2006

Minister of the Interior
- In office 22 December 2004 – 31 December 2006
- President: Heinz Fischer
- Chancellor: Wolfgang Schüssel
- Preceded by: Ernst Strasser
- Succeeded by: Wolfgang Schüssel (Acting)

Personal details
- Born: 27 March 1941 Tulln District, Ostmark, Nazi Germany
- Died: 31 December 2006 (aged 65) Sankt Pölten, Austria
- Party: People's Party
- Education: University of Vienna

Liese Prokop
Medal record

Representing Austria

Women's Athletics

Olympic Games
Silver medal – second place	1968 Mexico City	Pentathlon

European Championships
Gold medal – first place	1969 Athens	Pentathlon

Universiade
Gold medal – first place	1967 Tokyo	Pentathlon

Liesel "Liese" Prokop-Sykora (27 March 1941 – 31 December 2006) was an Austrian athlete and, later in her life, a politician. She competed mainly in the pentathlon.

== Biography ==
Born as Liese Sykora in Tulln District, Lower Austria, on 27 March 1941, she graduated from the University of Vienna with a degree in biology and sport. In 1965 she married her former coach, Gunnar Prokop. The couple had two sons and a daughter. in 1967, she became student world champion in Tokyo. She competed for Austria in the 1968 Summer Olympics held in Mexico City, Mexico in the Pentathlon where she won the silver medal. In 1969, she became European champion in Athens, breaking the world pentathlon record. In addition, she was Austrian champion in pentathlon, long jump, high jump, hurdles, relay and shot putting.

Prokop began her political career in 1969 and became a member of the Parliament of Lower Austria. She served as regional minister from 1981 to 1992 and vice president of Lower Austria during the period between 1992 and 2004.

She joined Assembly of European Regions (AER) in 1996 and held different administrative positions in the AER, including the president of the AER which she assumed from 2001 to 2004. Later she was made honorary president of the assembly.

Beginning in December 2004 she was Austrian minister of interior for the conservative ÖVP, becoming Austria's first female interior minister. She served in the cabinet led by Prime Minister Wolfgang Schüssel until her death on 31 December 2006. She died unexpectedly of aortic dissection while being rushed to a Sankt Pölten hospital on New Year's Eve, 2006. Chancellor Wolfgang Schüssel became acting interior minister upon this incident.

She was the sister of Maria Sykora, who competed at the 1972 Summer Olympics, and aunt of Winter Olympic bronze medalist Thomas Sykora. Her daughter, Karin Prokop is a professional handball player and politician.

Preceded by Ernst Strasser	Interior Minister of Austria; 2004 – 2006	Succeeded by Günther Platter
