= Anita Görbicz =

Hungarian handball player (born 1983)

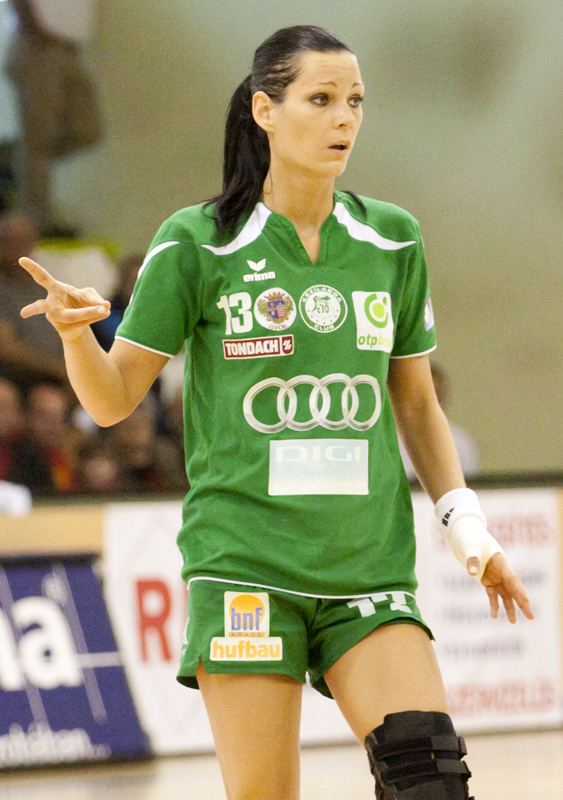
- Görbicz in 2011

Personal information
- Nationality: Hungarian
- Born: 13 May 1983 (age 43) Veszprém, Hungary
- Height: 1.73 m (5 ft 8 in)

Sport
- Sport: Handball
- Position: Center Back/Left Wing

Youth career
- Years: Team
- 1993–1997: Győri ETO KC

Senior clubs
- Years: Team
- 1997–2021: Győri ETO KC
National team
Years	Team	Apps	(Gls)
2002–2017	Hungary	232	(1111)

Teams managed
- 2020–2021: Győri ETO KC (assistant coach)
- 2020–2021: Hungary (assistant coach)
- 2021–2022: Győri ETO KC (sports director)
- 2022–: Győri ETO KC (president)
Medal record
World Championship
Silver medal – second place	2003 Croatia
Bronze medal – third place	2005 Russia
European Championship
Bronze medal – third place	2004 Hungary
Bronze medal – third place	2012 Serbia
Junior World Championship
Silver medal – second place	2001 Hungary

Anita Görbicz (born 13 May 1983) is a Hungarian former professional handballer. She is widely regarded as one of the best handball players of all time, and was voted IHF World Player of the Year in 2005 by the International Handball Federation. Görbicz has also been given the nickname the Queen of Handball internationally.

She is married; her husband is Ottó Vincze, a Hungarian former football player. They have two sons, Boldizsár, born in 2015 and Domonkos, born in 2022.

She is the Honorary Citizen of Győr.

She was included in the European Handball Federation Hall of Fame in 2023.

== Career ==
=== Club ===
Anita Görbicz started her career at Hungarian club Győri ETO KC in 1993, aged 10. She became a key member of the team and her absence is considered a notable disadvantage. With ETO, Görbicz won the Hungarian Championship and Cup several times. At European level, she reached the finals of the Cup Winners' Cup and EHF Cup.

Győri ETO reached the final stage of the Champions League for the first time in 2009. Due to a knee injury a few days before the matches, Görbicz missed the finals where the Győr side lost against Danish champion Viborg HK. In spite of this, she ranked second in the tournament's top goalscorers list.

Anita scored her 2000th goal in the Hungarian Championship in January 2018.

She has won the EHF Champions League trophy five times.

=== International ===
Görbicz participated in the 2003 World Championship where Hungary lost the final match against France. She received a bronze medal at the 2004 European Championship. In Russia 2005 she won bronze with her team.

Anita Görbicz has seen her performance with the national team officially recognized several times. She has been a member of the World Championship All-Star Team three times in a row: 2003, 2005 and 2007. She was also among the tournament top goalscorers in 2005 (ranked third) and 2007 (ranked second).

She was part of the Hungarian team at the 2004 Summer Olympic Games in Athens, and again at the 2008 Olympic Games in Beijing. In 2004 the Hungarian team placed fifth, after losing to the French team in the quarterfinals, and beating Brazil and Spain in the placement matches. At the 2008 Olympic Games Hungary placed fourth, after beating Romania in the quarterfinals and qualifying for the semifinals, losing to Russia in the semi, and then losing to South Korea in the bronze final. Görbicz scored 49 goals at the 2008 Olympics, second only to Romania's Ramona Maier.

Anita announced her retirement from the national team on 10 December 2017 after Hungary failed to qualify to the quarter-finals of the 2017 World Women's Handball Championship.

=== Personal life ===
Her first husband was András Présing. They married in 2006, and divorced after 17 months. Anita is married to former football player Ottó Vincze. She gave birth to their son, Boldizsár in June 2015. It was announced on 13 June 2022 that she's expecting her second child, Domonkos who was born in October 2022.

In 2025 she earned a Bachelor of Science degree in Commerce and Marketing, with a focus on international relations, from the Edutus College.

In the years preceding the 2026 Hungarian parliamentary election, Görbicz became publicly associated with Fidesz–KDNP circles. She joined the party-aligned Zebra Digitális Polgári Kör (Fidesz-linked civil circle founded by Máté Kocsis) and spoke at a government-supported anti-war rally in her hometown of Győr in November 2025. Her name was repeatedly floated in Hungarian media as a potential Fidesz–KDNP candidate for one of the Győr constituencies, although the party ultimately selected Szeles Szabolcs instead.

== Achievements ==
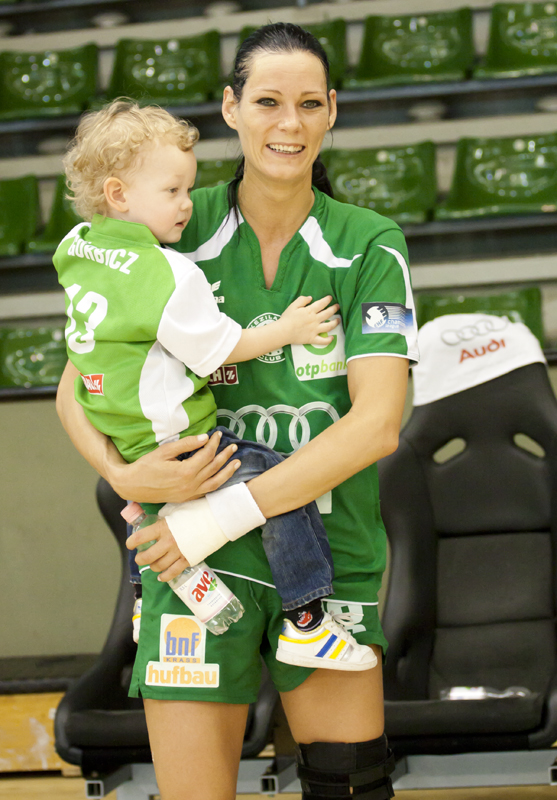
Görbicz in 2011

- Nemzeti Bajnokság I:
  - Winner (13): 2005, 2006, 2008, 2009, 2010, 2011, 2012, 2013, 2014, 2016, 2017, 2018, 2019
  - Silver Medalist: 2000, 2004, 2007, 2015
  - Bronze Medalist: 1999, 2001, 2002, 2003
- Magyar Kupa:
  - Winner (15): 2005, 2006, 2007, 2008, 2009, 2010, 2011, 2012, 2013, 2014, 2015, 2016, 2018, 2019, 2021
  - Finalist: 2000, 2002, 2004, 2017
- EHF Champions League:
  - Winner (5): 2013, 2014, 2017, 2018, 2019
  - Finalist: 2009, 2012, 2016
  - Semifinalist: 2007, 2008, 2010, 2011, 2021
- EHF Cup Winners' Cup:
  - Finalist: 2006
  - Semifinalist: 2003
- EHF Cup:
  - Finalist: 2002, 2004, 2005
- Junior World Championship:
  - Silver Medalist: 2001
- World Championship:
  - Silver Medalist: 2003
  - Bronze Medalist: 2005
- European Championship:
  - Bronze Medalist: 2004, 2012

== Individual awards ==
- IHF World Player of the Year: 2005
- Hungarian Handballer of the Year: 2005, 2006, 2007, 2013, 2014, 2017
- Nemzeti Bajnokság I Top Scorer: 2008
- All-Star Playmaker of the World Championship: 2003, 2005, 2007, 2013
- Prima Award: 2009
- EHF Champions League Top Scorer: 2012, 2014
- Carpathian Trophy Top Scorer: 2012, 2016
- All Star Team of the EHF Champions League: 2014
- EHF Female Player of the Month: May 2017, June 2017, April 2018

== See also ==
- List of women's handballers with 1000 or more international goals
