= IHF World Player of the Year =

Handball award

- Sport: Handball
- Competition: International Handball
- Awarded for: Best Performance in International Handball Competitions

History
- First award: 1988
- Most wins: Men: (Denmark) Mikkel Hansen (Denmark) Mathias Gidsel (France) Nikola Karabatić (3 awards each); Women: (Romania) Cristina Neagu (4 awards)
- Most recent: Men: (Denmark) Mathias Gidsel (3rd title); Women: (Norway) Henny Reistad (3rd title)

The IHF World Player of the Year is a handball award given annually to the player who is considered to have performed the best in the previous season, both at club and international competitions. It is awarded based on votes from experts, media and fans.

== About ==
The award was awarded by IHF since 1988 in both Men's and Women's Category separately.

No award was awarded in the years 1991, 1992, 1993, 2017, 2020 and 2022.

== Men ==
Year	Winner	Country	Position	Ref.
1988	Veselin Vujović	Yugoslavia	Left back	
1989	Kang Jae-Won	South Korea	Right back	
1990	Magnus Wislander	Sweden	Centre back	
1991	Not awarded			
1992	Not awarded			
1993	Not awarded			
1994	Talant Dujshebaev	Russia	Centre back	
1995	Jackson Richardson	France	Centre back	
1996	Talant Dujshebaev (2)	Spain	Centre back	
1997	Stéphane Stoecklin	France	Right back	
1998	Daniel Stephan	Germany	Left back	
1999	Rafael Guijosa	Spain	Left wing	
2000	Dragan Škrbić	FR Yugoslavia	Line player	
2001	Yoon Kyung-Shin	South Korea	Right back	
2002	Bertrand Gille	France	Line player	
2003	Ivano Balić	Croatia	Centre back	
2004	Henning Fritz	Germany	Goalkeeper	
2005	Arpad Šterbik	Serbia and Montenegro	Goalkeeper	
2006	Ivano Balić (2)	Croatia	Centre back	
2007	Nikola Karabatić	France	Centre back	
2008	Thierry Omeyer	France	Goalkeeper	
2009	Sławomir Szmal	Poland	Goalkeeper	
2010	Filip Jícha	Czech Republic	Left back	
2011	Mikkel Hansen	Denmark	Left back	
2012	Daniel Narcisse	France	Centre back	
2013	Domagoj Duvnjak	Croatia	Centre back	
2014	Nikola Karabatić (2)	France	Centre back	
2015	Mikkel Hansen (2)	Denmark	Left back	
2016	Nikola Karabatić (3)	France	Centre back	
2017	Not awarded			
2018	Mikkel Hansen (3)	Denmark	Left back	
2019	Niklas Landin Jacobsen	Denmark	Goalkeeper	
2020	Not awarded			
2021	Niklas Landin Jacobsen (2)	Denmark	Goalkeeper	
2022	Not awarded			
2023	Mathias Gidsel	Denmark	Right back	
2024	Mathias Gidsel (2)	Denmark	Right back	
2025	Mathias Gidsel (3)	Denmark	Right back	

== Women ==
Year	Winner	Country	Position
1988	Svetlana Kitić	Yugoslavia	Centre back
1989	Kim Hyun-Mee	South Korea	
1990	Jasna Kolar-Merdan	Austria	Left back
1991	Not awarded		
1992	Not awarded		
1993	Not awarded		
1994	Mia Hermansson	Sweden	Centre back
1995	Erzsébet Kocsis	Hungary	Line player
1996	Lim O-Kyeong	South Korea	Centre back
1997	Anja Andersen	Denmark	Left back
1998	Trine Haltvik	Norway	Centre back
1999	Ausra Fridrikas	Austria	Left back
2000	Bojana Radulović	Hungary	Right back
2001	Cecilie Leganger	Norway	Goalkeeper
2002	Zhai Chao	China	Centre back
2003	Bojana Radulović (2)	Hungary	Right back
2004	Anita Kulcsár	Hungary	Line player
2005	Anita Görbicz	Hungary	Centre back
2006	Nadine Krause	Germany	Left back
2007	Gro Hammerseng	Norway	Centre back
2008	Linn-Kristin Riegelhuth	Norway	Right wing
2009	Allison Pineau	France	Centre back
2010	Cristina Neagu	Romania	Left back
2011	Heidi Løke	Norway	Line player
2012	Alexandra do Nascimento	Brazil	Right wing
2013	Andrea Lekić	Serbia	Centre back
2014	Eduarda Amorim	Brazil	Left back
2015	Cristina Neagu (2)	Romania	Left back
2016	Cristina Neagu (3)	Romania	Left back
2017	Not awarded		
2018	Cristina Neagu (4)	Romania	Left back
2019	Stine Bredal Oftedal	Norway	Centre back
2020	Not awarded		
2021	Sandra Toft	Denmark	Goalkeeper
2022	Not awarded		
2023	Henny Reistad	Norway	Left back
2024	Henny Reistad (2)	Norway	Left back
2025	Henny Reistad (3)	Norway	Left back

== Previous awards ==
While the IHF has only reported awards since 1988, other players have been voted best players in the world before.

Thus, the Romanian Ștefan Birtalan was elected World Player of the Year in 1974, 1976 and 1977. And Ioan Moser of Romania was also named "Best Handball Player in the World” in 1964.

== Best players of all time ==
In 1992, Gheorghe Gruia of Romania was named Best Player of All Time by the International Handball Federation.

In 2000, Magnus Wislander of Sweden and Zinaida Turchyna of Ukraine were elected Players of the 20th Century by the IHF.

In 2010, Ivano Balić of Croatia and Svetlana Kitić of Yugoslavia were voted Best Players Ever in an online poll organized by the IHF.

== Team of the century ==
In 2000, the official bulletin of the International Handball Federation, World Handball Magazine, chose Gheorghe Gruia, Ioan Moser and Cornel Penu as members of the "Team of the Century".

== Other awards ==
In 2010, the fans voted Thierry Omeyer as world's best goalkeeper ever. And in 2011, the fans voted for Luminița Dinu (born Huțupan) as best female goalkeeper ever.

Previously in 2009, Steffen Fäth and Cristina Neagu respectively won Rookie of the Year award for male and female.

== See also ==
- EHF Players of the Year
