= Martin Boquist =

Swedish handball player (born 1977)

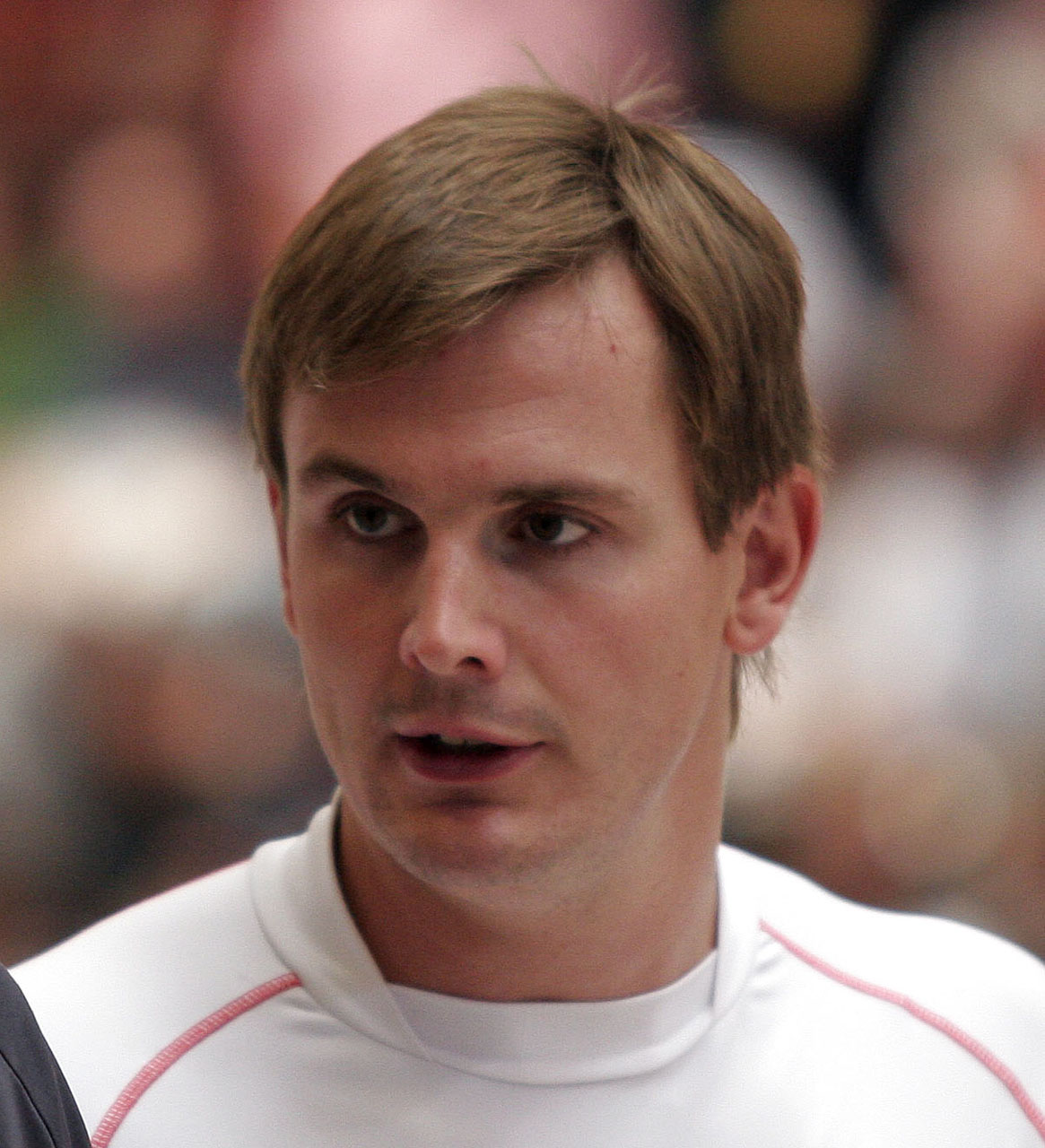
- Martin Boquist in August 2007

Personal information
- Full name: Sven Martin Boquist
- Nationality: Swedish
- Born: 2 February 1977 (age 49) Gothenburg, Sweden
- Height: 1.97 m (6 ft 6 in)

Sport
- Sport: Handball
- Position: Left back

Youth career
- Years: Team
- –: HP Warta

Senior clubs
- Years: Team
- 1996–1998: HP Warta
- 1998–2003: Redbergslids IK
- 2003–2005: THW Kiel
- 2005–2010: FCK Håndbold
- 2010–2013: VästeråsIrsta HF (Player-coach)
National team
Years	Team	Apps	(Gls)
1996–2008	Sweden	219	(496)

Teams managed
- 2010–2015: VästeråsIrsta HF
- 2015–2017: Ricoh HK
- 2016–2022: Sweden (assistant)
- 2019–: VästeråsIrsta HF (assistant)
- 2022–: Norway (assistant)
Medal record
Olympic Games
Silver medal – second place	2000 Sydney	Team
World Championship
Gold medal – first place	1999 Egypt	Team
Silver medal – second place	2001 France	Team
Silver medal – second place	2021 Egypt	Assistant
European Championship
Gold medal – first place	1998 Italy	Team
Gold medal – first place	2002 Sweden	Team
Gold medal – first place	2022 Hungary/Slovakia	Assistant
Silver medal – second place	2018 Croatia	Assistant

Sven Martin Boquist (born 2 February 1977) is a Swedish handball coach, previously handball player. Currently he is assistant coach for VästeråsIrsta HF, and the Norwegian men’s national team.

== Career ==
Boquist began his career at his hometown club HP Warta, before joining Redbergslids IK in 1998. Here he won the 2000, 2001 and 2003 Swedish Handball League and reached the final of the EHF Cup Winners' Cup in 2003. The same season he was the top scorer and named Swedish player of the year for a second time.

He then joined German club THW Kiel, where he won the 2005 German Championship and the EHF Cup in 2004.

Due to competition for playing time for Nikola Karabatić he left the club in 2005 for Danish side FCK Håndbold. Here he won the 2008 Danish Championship. Same season he extended his contract until 2010. He then won the 2010 Cup.

In 2010 he returned to Sweden and joined VästeråsIrsta HF as the player-coach. He said that he wanted to play for a club where he was sure to be an important part of the team, and chose Västerås, because his wife, Jenny, is from there.

=== National team ===
Boquist won gold medals at the 1999 World Championship and the 1998, 2000 and 2002 European Championships. He also won silver medals at the 2000 Olympics.

== Coaching career ==
After retiring from playing in 2013 he became the full time head coach of VästeråsIrsta HF. In 2015 he joined Ricoh HK. In 2016 he also became the assistant coach at the Swedish national team. In this position he won gold medals at the 2022 European Championship and silver medals at the 2018 European Championship and the 2021 World Championship. In 2017 he stopped as the coach of Ricoh HK. In 2019 he returned to VästeråsIrsta HF, this time as the assistant coach.

He ceased to be the assistant coach for Sweden in 2022, just after Sweden won the 2022 European Championship. The same year he became the assistant coach at the Norwegian men’s national team.

== Private ==
He has the nickname Boken (eng: 'The Book') or Einstein.

He is married with former Swedish national team player Jenny Lindblom, and has a son, Arvid, from 2005. His son also plays handball and Martin has previously been his coach.

== Achievements ==
=== As player ===
- EHF Cup
  - Winner: 2004
  - Runner-up: 2008
- EHF Cup Winners' Cup
  - Runner-up: 2003
- German Bundesliga
  - Winner: 2005
- Swedish League
  - Winner: 2000, 2001, 2003
- Danish League
  - Winner: 2008
- Danish Cup
  - Winner: 2009

Individual awards

- Handball player of the year in Sweden: 2002, 2003

=== As Coach ===
- European Men's Handball Championship
  - Winner: 2022
  - Silver: 2018
- World Men's Handball Championship
  - Silver: 2021
