= Women Handball Liga Austria =

Handball Liga Austria
- Founded: 1972
- No. of teams: 12
- Country: Austria
- Confederation: EHF
- Most recent champion: Hypo Niederösterreich (47 titles)
- Most titles: Hypo Niederösterreich (47 titles)
- Level on pyramid: 1
- International cups: EHF Champions League; EHF Cup; EHF Challenge Cup
- Website: Official Website
- 2024–25 season

The Women Handball Liga Austria (WHA) is the name of the handball league of Austria.

== Competition format ==
The season begins with a regular season between the twelve teams. The first two teams qualifies to the final. The final is decided over two games where the winner is named Austrian champion.

== Women Handball Liga Austria past champions ==
- 1972 : Union Admira Landhaus
- 1973 : Union Admira Landhaus (2)
- 1974 : Union Admira Landhaus (3)
- 1975 : Union Admira Landhaus (4)
- 1976 : Union Admira Landhaus (5)
- 1977 : Hypo NÖ
- 1978 : Hypo NÖ (2)
- 1979 : Hypo NÖ (3)
- 1980 : Hypo NÖ (4)
- 1981 : Hypo NÖ (5)
- 1982 : Hypo NÖ (6)
- 1983 : Hypo NÖ (7)
- 1984 : Hypo NÖ (8)
- 1985 : Hypo NÖ (9)
- 1986 : Hypo NÖ (10)
- 1987 : Hypo NÖ (11)
- 1988 : Hypo NÖ (12)
- 1989 : Hypo NÖ (13)
- 1990 : Hypo NÖ (14)
- 1991 : Hypo NÖ (15)
- 1992 : Hypo NÖ (16)
- 1993 : Hypo NÖ (17)
- 1994 : Hypo NÖ (18)
- 1995 : Hypo NÖ (19)
- 1996 : Hypo NÖ (20)
- 1997 : Hypo NÖ (21)
- 1998 : Hypo NÖ (22)
- 1999 : Hypo NÖ (23)
- 2000 : Hypo NÖ (24)
- 2001 : Hypo NÖ (25)
- 2002 : Hypo NÖ (26)
- 2003 : Hypo NÖ (27)
- 2004 : Hypo NÖ (28)
- 2005 : Hypo NÖ (29)
- 2006 : Hypo NÖ (30)
- 2007 : Hypo NÖ (31)
- 2008 : Hypo NÖ (32)
- 2009 : Hypo NÖ (33)
- 2010 : Hypo NÖ (34)
- 2011 : Hypo NÖ (35)
- 2012 : Hypo NÖ (36)
- 2013 : Hypo NÖ (37)
- 2014 : Hypo NÖ (38)
- 2015 : Hypo NÖ (39)
- 2016 : Hypo NÖ (40)
- 2017 : Hypo NÖ (41)
- 2018 : Hypo NÖ (42)
- 2019 : WAT Atzgersdorf
- 2020 : not awarded
- 2021 : Hypo NÖ (43)
- 2022 : Hypo NÖ (44)
- 2023 : Hypo NÖ (45)
- 2024 : Hypo NÖ (46)
- 2025 : Hypo NÖ (47)

	Club	Titles	Year
1.	Hypo NÖ	47	1977, 1978, 1979, 1980, 1981, 1982, 1983, 1984, 1985, 1986, 1987, 1988, 1989, 1990, 1991, 1992, 1993, 1994, 1995, 1996, 1997, 1998, 1999, 2000, 2001, 2002, 2003, 2004, 2005, 2006, 2007, 2008, 2009, 2010, 2011, 2012, 2013, 2014, 2015, 2016, 2017, 2018, 2021, 2022, 2023, 2024, 2025
2.	Union Admira Landhaus	5	1972, 1973, 1974, 1975, 1976
3.	WAT Atzgersdorf	1	2019

== EHF coefficient ranking ==
For season 2017/2018, see footnote

- 12. (15) (Poland) PGNiG Superliga (26.00)
- 13. (16) (Turkey) Süper Ligi (24.36)
- 14. (9) Women Handball Liga Austria (23.92)
- 15. (13) (Croatia) 1. HRL (22.75)
- 16. (14) (Spain) División de Honor (22.30)
