= Hypo Niederösterreich =

Austrian handball club

- Full name: Hypo Niederösterreich
- Short name: Hypo
- Founded: 1972
- Arena: Bundessport- und Freizeitzentrum Südstadt, Maria Enzersdorf
- Capacity: 1,200
- President: Alois Ecker
- Head coach: Martin Matuschkowitz
- League: Women Handball Austria
- 2023-24: Women Handball Austria, 1st
- Club colours
Home	Away

Hypo Niederösterreich (Hypo NÖ) is an Austrian women's handball club, headquartered in Maria Enzersdorf. They are one of the most successful teams on the EHF Champions League, having won the title eight times. They are also former winners of the EHF Champions Trophy in 2000.

Between 2011 and 2014, Hypo NÖ had a partnership with the Brazilian Handball Confederation, playing host to various players of the Brazil women's national handball team - including Alexandra Nascimento, who already played for Hypo since 2003 - and coach Morten Soubak. During the period, Brazil won the 2013 World Women's Handball Championship with six Hypo Nö players in its roster. Hypo Nö also won the EHF Women's Cup Winners' Cup that year.

== History ==
=== Founding and the first years ===
Hypo Niederösterreich was founded in 1972 by a group of successful Austrian athletes, among others, Liese Prokop, Maria Sykora and Eva Janko, and the coach Gunnar Prokop.

In just a few years Hypo NÖ established itself as one of the biggest teams in Austrian handball and won their first Austrian league title in 1977.

In the 1980's they became one of the strongest teams in Europe. In 1987 they made the final of the EHF Champions League for the first time, but lost to Ukrainian side Spartak Kiev. In 1988 they made the final again, but once again lost to Spartak Kiev. The following year they met Spartak Kyiv in the final for the third year in a row, and this they won the title for the first time.

After the dissolution of the Soviet Union, Hypo Niederösterreich attracted many former national team players to the club, including IHF 1999 World player of the year Ausra Fridrikas, as well as Rima Sypkus and Tatyana Dzhandzhgava among others. The team formed the backbone of the 1990's Austrian national team that won a bronze medal at the 1996 European Championship and the 1999 World Championship. Meanwhile Hypo won several champions leagues in the 90s.

=== The Prokop Controversy ===
On the 29th of October in a Champions League match with 7 seconds remaining against french Metz Handball the Hypo NÖ coach, Gunnar Prokop, entered the field and tackled Metz player Svetlana Ognjenović in order to stop a counterattack. The score was 27–27 at the time, and he thus prevented Metz from potentially winning the match. Prokop got a red card, but Metz could not score and match did end in a 27-27 draw.

Days after, on November 4th 2009, the European Handball Federation suspended Prokop from all handball related activities for three years, as well as for life for all political and administrative positions in handball and a fine of 45,000 euros. The club received a fine of 30,000 euroes. They also had 1 point deducted in the Champions League; the one point they had gained by drawing Metz.

The fine was later reduced to 10,000 euroes and Prokop's suspension reduced to 1 year.

=== After Prokop ===
Gunnar Prokop resigned and was replaced by Christian Mali He was however fired after only 6 days and replaced by Oh Seong-Ok as player-coach until the end of the season.

Afterwards Martin Matuschkowitz took over for a season.

In 2011 Hungarian Andras Nemeth took over. in 2013 they won the EHF Cup Winners' Cup and Nemeth resigned the same season. He was replaced by Danish Morten Soubak.

In 2017 they managed to not win the Austrian Women's Handball Cup for the first time since 1990, when they lost to MGA Fivers. The year after they lost again to UHC Stockerau, but in 2019 they were back to their winning ways. The same year they did however not win Austrian League for the first time since 1978, when they lost the final to WAT Atzgersdorf.

== Honours ==
- Women Handball Austria:
  - Winners (48): 1977, 1978, 1979, 1980, 1981, 1982, 1983, 1984, 1985, 1986, 1987, 1988, 1989, 1990, 1991, 1992, 1993, 1994, 1995, 1996, 1997, 1998, 1999, 2000, 2001, 2002, 2003, 2004, 2005, 2006, 2007, 2008, 2009, 2010, 2011, 2012, 2013, 2014, 2015, 2016, 2017, 2018, 2021, 2022, 2023, 2024, 2025, 2026
- ÖHB Cup:
  - Winners (36): 1988, 1989, 1990, 1991, 1992, 1993, 1994, 1995, 1996, 1997, 1998, 1999, 2000, 2001, 2002, 2003, 2004, 2005, 2006, 2007, 2008, 2009, 2010, 2011, 2012, 2013, 2014, 2015, 2016, 2019, 2021, 2022, 2023, 2024, 2025, 2026
- EHF Champions League:
  - Winners (8): 1989, 1990, 1992, 1993, 1994, 1995, 1998, 2000
  - Runners-Up (5): 1987, 1988, 1991, 1996, 2008
  - Semi-finals (7): 1984, 1985, 1997, 1999, 2005, 2007, 2009
- EHF Champions Trophy:
  - Winners (1): 2000
  - Runners-Up (2): 2004, 2008
- EHF Cup Winners' Cup:
  - Winners (1): 2013
  - Runners-Up (1): 2004
- Women Handball International League:
  - Winner: (1) 2003

== Team ==
=== Current squad ===
Squad for the 2026–27 season

Goalkeepers

- 44 (Austria) Andjela Roganovic
- 30 (Austria) Lea Krenn
- 16 (Austria) Cecilia Magyar

Wingers
RW

- 4 (Austria) Lara Brezenci
- 31 (Austria) Lisa Spalt
- 28 (Austria) Sophie Klinghofer

LW

- (Austria) Lisa Neidhart
- (Austria) Larissa Bures
- (Austria) Simone Kuhnert
- 17 (Austria) Johanna Bauer
- 89 (Austria) Anja Lovric

Line players

- 25 (Austria) Lina Kovacs
- 15 (Austria) Armina Muhović
- 11 (Austria) Angelika Hager
- 54 (Austria) Lena Resch

Back players
LB

- 33 (Austria) Martina Maticevic
- 48 (Austria) Nina Niedhart
- 21 (Austria) Patricia Tomic-Kesina

CB

- 9 (Austria) (Hungary) Patricia Mihalics
- 2 (Austria) Anastasia Kostovski

RB

- 7 (Hungary) Panna Csata
- 14 (Austria) Rebecca Chroust
- 13 (Austria) Phibie Kovacs

=== Technical staff ===
- (Hungary) Head Coach: Ferenc Kovács
- (Austria) Assistant Coach: Alla Matuschkowitz
- (Austria) Physiotherapist: Sven Köhler
- (Austria) Physiotherapist: Dr. Olaf Sonntag

== Selected former players ==
- (Angola) Belina Lariça
- (Austria) (Socialist Federal Republic of Yugoslavia) Jasna Kolar-Merdan
- (Austria) (Soviet Union) (Lithuania) Ausra Fridrikas
- (Austria) (Ukraine) Tanja Logwin
- (Austria) (Ukraine) Nataliya Rusnachenko
- (Austria) (Romania) Liliana Topea
- (Austria) (Romania) Simona Spiridon
- (Austria) (Romania) Gabriela Rotiș
- (Austria) (Romania) Edith Matei
- (Austria) (Romania) Sorina Teodorovic
- (Austria) (Bosnia and Herzegovina) Gorica Aćimović
- (Austria) (Hungary) Mariann Rácz
- (Austria) Katrin Engel
- (Austria) Petra Blazek
- (Austria) Iris Morhammer
- (Austria) Laura Fritz
- (Austria) Lolita Magelinskas
- (Austria) Stephanie Subke
- (Austria) (Poland) Renata Cieloch
- (Austria) (Lithuania) Rima Sypkus
- (Austria) Barbara Strass
- (Austria) (Soviet Union) Tatyana Dzhandzhgava
- (Austria) (Socialist Federal Republic of Yugoslavia) Stanka Božović
- (Austria) (Serbia) Marina Budecevic
- (Belarus) Alla Matushkowitz
- (Brazil) Daniela Piedade
- (Brazil) Barbara Arenhart
- (Brazil) Francine Moraes
- (Brazil) Fernanda da Silva
- (Brazil) Francielle da Rocha
- (Brazil) Ana Paula Rodrigues
- (Brazil) Deonise Cavaleiro
- (Brazil) Idalina Mesquita
- (Brazil) Alexandra Nascimento
- (Brazil) Fabiana Diniz
- (Brazil) Mariana Costa
- (Brazil) Silvia Pinheiro
- (Brazil) Caroline Dias Minto
- (Brazil) Adriana Lima do Nascimento
- (China) Yu Geli
- (Croatia) Anđa Bilobrk
- (Croatia) Vesna Horaček
- (Croatia) Petra Vrdoljak
- (Croatia) Renata Pavlacic
- (Denmark) Christina Haurum
- (Denmark) Anne Dorthe Tanderup
- (France) Marion Limal
- (France) Audrey Bruneau
- (Germany) Sabine Englert
- (Hungary) Beatrix Balogh
- (Hungary) Erika Kirsner
- (Hungary) Dóra Lőwy
- (Hungary) Helga Németh
- (Hungary) Rita Deli
- (Hungary) Bernadett Temes
- (Hungary) Viktória Soós
- (Hungary) Nikolett Brigovácz
- (Hungary) Marianna Nagy
- (Hungary) Tímea Tóth
- (Hungary) Vivien Léránt
- (Hungary) Ibolya Mehlmann
- (Hungary) Anna Hajgató
- (Hungary) (Germany) Csilla Elekes
- (South Korea) Oh Seong-Ok
- (South Korea) Kim Cha-Youn
- (South Korea) Sun Hee-Han
- (South Korea) Myoung Bok-Hee
- (South Korea) Huh Soon-Young
- (South Korea) Park Chung-Hee
- (South Korea) Moon Kyeong-ha
- (Lithuania) Sonata Vijunaite
- (Lithuania) Ruta Latakaite
- (Lithuania) Vilma Gainskyte
- (North Macedonia) Valentina Radulović
- (Norway) Terese Pedersen
- (Norway) Mette Davidsen
- (Romania) Paula Ungureanu
- (Romania) Alina Marin
- (Romania) Carmen Petca
- (Serbia) Katarina Tomašević
- (Serbia) Marijana Midzor
- (Bosnia and Herzegovina) Kornelija Rajkovic
- (Czech Republic) Lucie Barakova
- (Slovakia) Marianna Gubová
- (Slovakia) Zuzana Koniková
- (Slovakia) Alzbeta Tothová
- (Slovenia) Katja Kurent Tatarovac
- (Sweden) Mia Hermansson Högdahl
- (Russia) Olga Sanko
- (Russia) Elena Chatalova
- (Russia) Oxana Pal
- (Russia) Svetlana Mozgovaya
- (Russia) Anna Andryushchenko
- (Russia) Larisa Kiselyova
- (Russia) Liubov Korotneva
- (Ukraine) Tetyana Shynkarenko
- (Ukraine) Oksana Sakada
- (Ukraine) Mariya Boklashchuk
- (Ukraine) Svetlana Morozova
- (Ukraine) Ganna Kryvoruchko
- (Ukraine) Valentina Ivanko
- (Poland) Bozena Karkut
- (Poland) Renata Sobowiec
- (United States) Leora Jones
- (Switzerland) Gabriela Kottmann
- (Chile) Maria Eugenia Musalem Araos
- (Socialist Federal Republic of Yugoslavia) (Serbia) Vania Mugosa
- (Socialist Federal Republic of Yugoslavia) (Serbia) Slađana Dronić
- (Socialist Federal Republic of Yugoslavia) (Serbia) Dragica Đurić-Krstić
- (Niger) Victoria Farley
- (Turkmenistan) Larisa Shumilova

== Coaching history ==
- (Austria) Gunnar Prokop (2005)
- (Bosnia and Herzegovina) Senad Jagodic
- (Hungary) László Laurencz (1984–1985)
- (Croatia) Vinko Kandija (1985–1987; 1991–1992; 1999–2001)
- (Hungary) János Csík (1987–1989)
- (Netherlands) Ton van Linder (1989–1990)
- (Hungary) Sándor Vass (1990–1991)
- (Sweden) Arne Högdahl (1992–1995)
- (Croatia) Ivica Rimanić (1995–1997)
- (Austria) Martin Matuschkowitz (1997–1998; 2003–2004; 2009–2011; 2016–2018)
- (Hungary) László Kovács (1998–1999)
- (Slovakia) Ján Packa (2001–2002)
- (Hungary) János Gyurka (2002–2003)
- (Russia) Yuriy Klimov (2004–2005)
- (Serbia) Mile Isaković (from December 2004 to February 2005)
- (Denmark) Ryan Zinglersen (2005–2007)
- (Hungary) András Németh (2007–2009, 2011–2013)
- (Austria) Christian Maly (2009)
- (Denmark) Morten Soubak (2013–2014)
- (Hungary) (Austria) Ferenc Kovács (2009, 2014–2016; 2018–)
