= Agnes Østergaard =

Danish handball player (1929–2006)

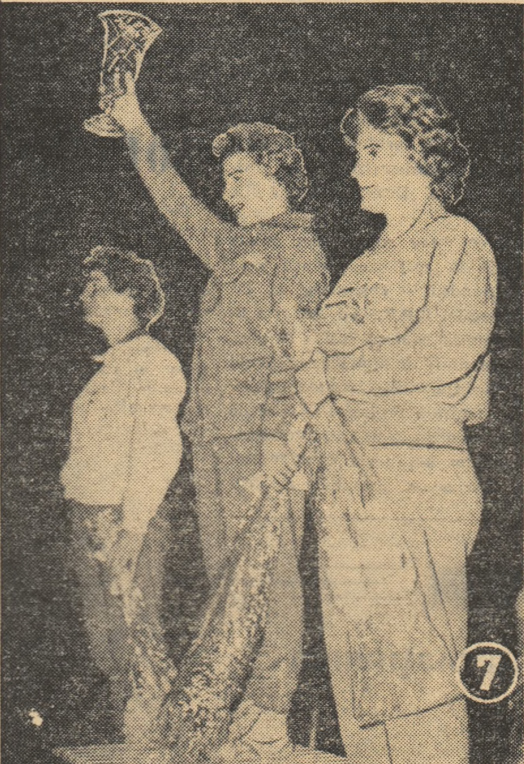
- Agnes Østergaard, Iosefina Ștefănescu, Jana Vrbová, 1962

Personal information
- Nationality: Danish
- Born: 27 October 1929 Odder, Denmark
- Died: 7 January 2006 (aged 76)

Sport
- Sport: Athletics, Handball
- Event(s): Javelin throw, shot put, discus throw, Combined track and field events
Medal record
Representing Denmark
World Championships
Silver medal – second place	1962 Romania	Team

Agnes Østergaard Olsen (27 October 1929 – 7 January 2006) was a Danish athlete and Handball player.

In athletics Østergaard won 9 Danish championships between 1949 and 1954. In shot put, on July 1st 1951 in Aabyhøj she was the first Danish women to pass 12 meters (12.49). On September 7th 1952 she was the first Danish women to cross 13 meters (13.12).

Østergaard also played handball in Frederiksberg IF and won Danish League in 1956, 1959, 1962 and 1966. She made her debut on the national team on 26 November 1953 and played 39 international matches and scored 51 goals. She won silver at the 1962 World Championships in Romania.

== Danish athletics medals ==
- Gold 1954 Shot put 11.58 m
- Silver 1954 Discus throw 34.55 m
- Silver 1954 Javelin throw 35.57 m
- Gold 1953 Shot put 12.33 m
- Gold 1953 Discus throw 36.66 m
- Bronze 1953 Javelin throw 39.08 m
- Gold 1953 Combined track and field events (8-matct)
- Gold 1952 Shot put 12.26 m
- Gold 1952 Discus throw 36.28 m
- Bronze 1952 Javelin throw 37.60 m
- Gold 1951 Shot put 12.21 m
- Gold 1951 Discus throw 34.18 m
- Silver 1950 Shot put 11.07 m
- Gold 1949 Shot put 11.05 m
- Bronze 1948 Shot put 11.39 m

== Danish records ==
- Shot put

11.96 m – 1951
12.49 m – 1951
12.55 m – 1952
13,12 m – 1952

- Discus throw

38.50 m – 1952

== Danish Handball Medals ==
- 1956: DM Gold
- 1959: DM Gold
- 1962: DM Gold
- 1964: Pokal Gold
- 1965: Pokal Gold
- 1966: DM Gold, Pokal Silver
