= Victoria Dumitrescu =

Romanian handball player (1935-2009)

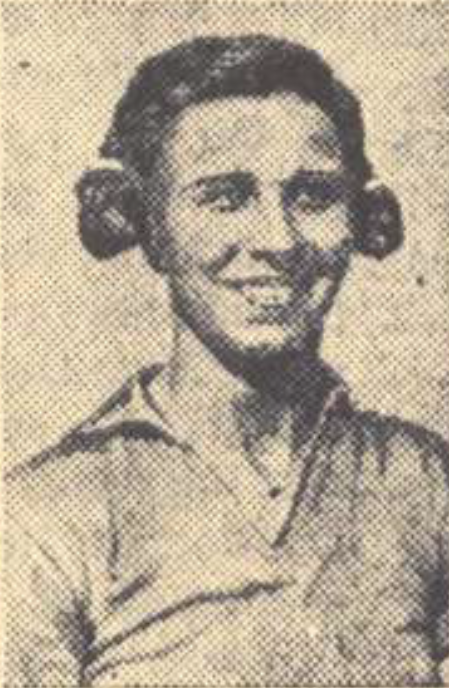

Personal information
- Nationality: Romanian
- Born: 1 December 1935 Bucharest, Romania
- Died: 22 December 2009 (aged 74)

Sport
- Sport: Handball
- Position: Left back
National team
Years	Team	Apps	(Gls)
1956-	Romania	17	(5)
Medal record
Outdoor World Championship
Gold medal – first place	1956 West Germany
Gold medal – first place	1960 Netherlands
Indoor World Championship
Gold medal – first place	1962 Romania

Victoria Dumitrescu (1 December 1935 – 22 December 2009), nicknamed Victorița, was a Romanian handballer who played for the Romanian national team. She won the outdoor World Championship twice and the indoor World Championship once. At club level, she played for Steagu Roșu București.

== Individual awards ==
- World Championship Top Scorer: 1956
