= Aurelia Szőke-Tudor =

Romanian handball player (1936-2013)

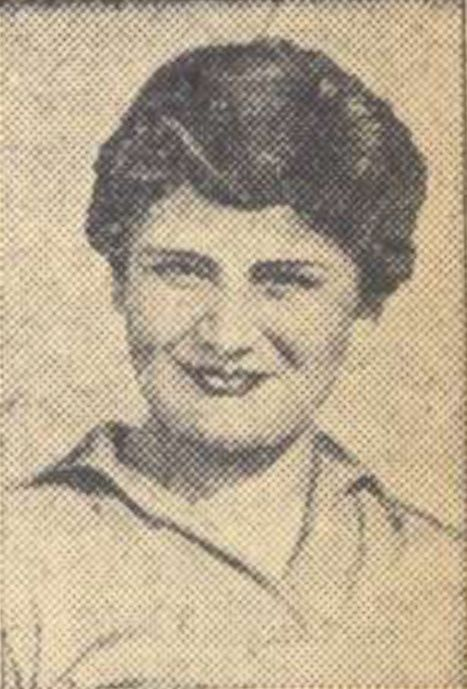

Personal information
- Nationality: Romanian
- Born: 1936 Mintiu Gherlii, Romania
- Died: 16 October 2013 (aged 77)

Sport
- Sport: Handball
- Position: Centre back
National team
- Years: Team
- –: Romania
Medal record
Outdoor World Championship
Gold medal – first place	1956 West Germany
Gold medal – first place	1960 Netherlands
Indoor World Championship
Gold medal – first place	1962 Romania

Aurelia Szőke-Tudor (1936 – 16 October 2013), formerly known as Aurelia Sălăgean or as Aurelia Sălăgeanu, was a Romanian handballer who played for the Romanian national team. At club level, she played for Târgu Mureș, Știința București or Rapid București.

== International trophies ==
- European Champions Cup:
  - Winner: 1961, 1964
- World Championship:
  - Gold Medalist: 1956, 1960, 1962
