= Cozma =

Cozma is a Romanian surname. Notable people with the surname include:

- Miron Cozma (born 1943), Romanian labor union organizer
- Ionela Cozma, Romanian swimmer
- Marian Cozma (1982–2009), Romanian handball player
- Valentina Cozma, Romanian handball player
