= Ana Starck-Stănișel =

Romanian handball player (1935–2024)

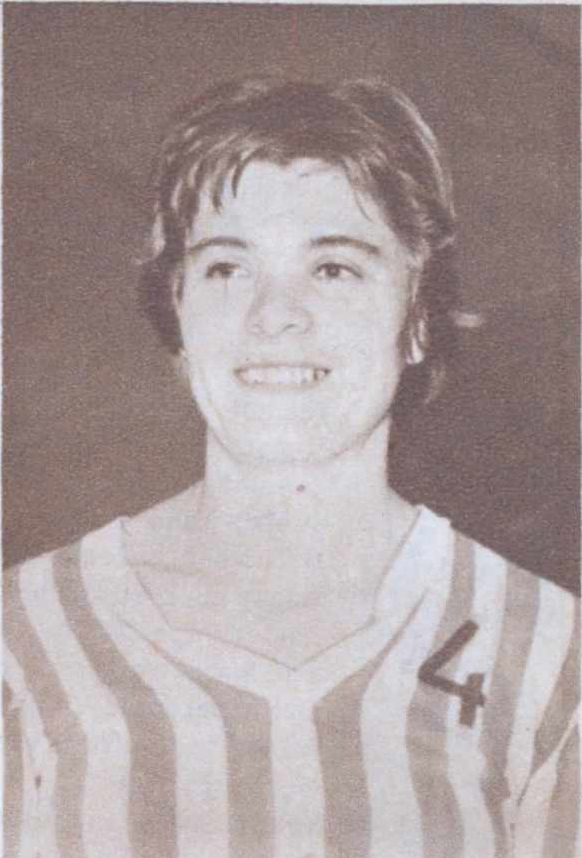

Personal information
- Nationality: Romanian
- Born: 28 January 1935 Bucharest, Romania
- Died: 26 March 2024 (aged 89) Frankfurt am Main

Sport
- Sport: Handball
- Position: Right back

Senior clubs
- Years: Team
- 1953–1959: Progresul Brașov
- 1959–1978: Rapid București
- 1978–1979: PSV Frankfurt
National team
Years	Team	Apps	(Gls)
1955–1976	Romania	72	(186)
Medal record
Outdoor World Championship
Gold medal – first place	1956 West Germany
Gold medal – first place	1960 Netherlands
Indoor World Championship
Gold medal – first place	1962 Romania

Ana Starck-Stănișel (née Starck; 28 January 1935 – 26 March 2024), also known as Ana Stark-Stănișel or as Anna Stark-Stănișel, was a Romanian handballer who played for the Romanian national team. Starck-Stănișel died in Bucharest on 26 March 2024, at the age of 89.

At the 1962 World Women's Handball Championship she won gold medals with the Romanian team, beating Denmark in the final. She was joint topscorer together with Marie Matuje with 14 goals.

== Trophies ==
- Liga Națională:
  - Winner: 1961, 1962, 1963, 1967
- Cupa României:
  - Winner: 1956, 1961
- European Champions Cup:
  - Winner: 1964
- World Championship:
  - Gold Medalist: 1962
- Carpathian Trophy:
  - Winner: 1960, 1961, 1962, 1963, 1966, 1967
