= Anna Nemetz-Schauberger =

Romanian handball player (born 1944)

Olympic medal record

Women's handball

Representing Romania

World Championship
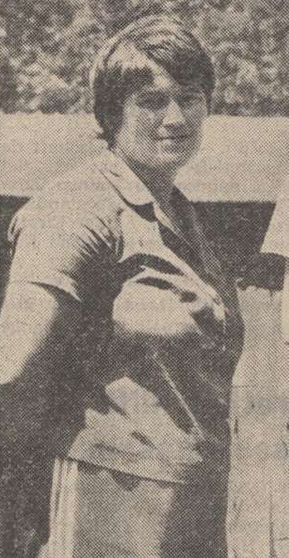
Gold medal – first place	1962 Romania	Anna Nemetz-Schauberger, unknown date

Anna Nemetz-Schauberger (born 4 January 1944, Ciacova) is a Romanian-born former handball player, a member of the team that won the World Championship in 1962.

After taking up handball in 1958, she started playing for "Banatul" in 1959, with which she managed to be promoted to the top league in 1960. Called up to the national team at the age of 16, she became both a national champion and a world champion in 1962 at the age of 18. Later the same year, she transferred to Știința Timișoara, a team with which she would win the national championship in 1964, and after the team was incorporated into Timișoara University in 1966, again in 1966, 1968 and 1969.

In addition to 45 appearances for the national team, she also played 16 times for the youth national team, and 4 times for the junior national team.

In 2009, she was awarded the Sport Merit Award, Second Class.

In 2011, she was made an honorary citizen of her hometown, Ciacova.

Since 1990 she has been living in Augsburg, Germany.
