= Irina Klimovschi =

Romanian handball player (1936-2001)

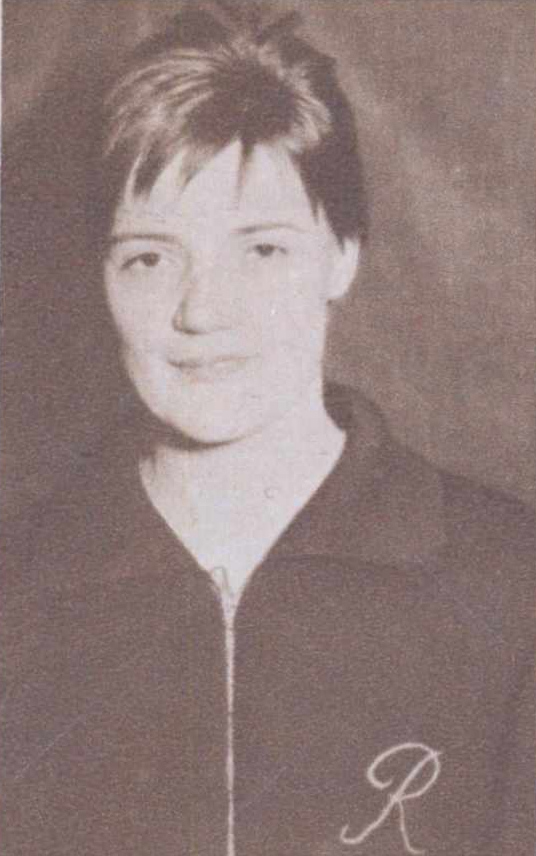

Personal information
- Full name: Irina Hector Klimovschi
- Nationality: Romanian
- Born: Târgu Mureș, Romania

Sport
- Sport: Handball
- Position: Goalkeeper
National team
Years	Team	Apps	(Gls)
1953–1971	Romania	152	(2)
Medal record
Outdoor World Championship
Gold medal – first place	1956 West Germany
Gold medal – first place	1960 Netherlands
Indoor World Championship
Gold medal – first place	1962 Romania

Irina Klimovschi (née Nagy; Hungarian: Nagy Ilona; 1936 – 2 May 2001) was a Romanian handballer who played for the Romanian national team. At club level, she played for SMTCF Târgu Mureș, Progresul Târgu Mureș, Știința București or Rapid București. Together with Luminița Dinu-Huțupan, she is regarded by Constantin Popescu–Pilică as the greatest Romanian goalkeeper of all time.

== International trophies ==
- European Champions Cup:
  - Winner: 1961, 1964
- World Championship:
  - Gold Medalist: 1956, 1960, 1962

== Individual awards ==
- All-Star Goalkeeper of the World Championship: 1956, 1960

== Personan life ==
According to Siebenbürgische Zeitung, her surname was "Klimowski".
