= Tomas Ryde =

Swedish handball coach (born 1960)

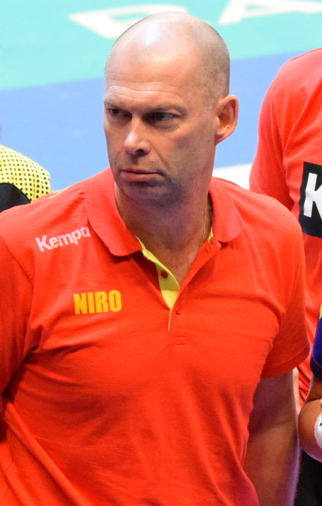

Personal information
- Full name: Tomas Robert Ryde
- Nationality: Swedish
- Born: August 1960 (age 66)

Sport
- Sport: Handball

Teams managed
- –: Tyresö HF
- –: Skuru IK
- 1990–1994: Sweden Women
- 1999–2002: Sweden Women
- –: Ikast-Bording
- –2005: Djurgården
- 2005–2008: Viborg HK
- 2015–2016: Romania Women
- 2019: CSM Bucharest
- 2019: Romania Women

Tomas Robert Ryde (born August 1960) is a Swedish handball coach who coaches the Romanian women's national team.

At the end of the 2007–08 season, he left Danish Viborg 'for family reasons' to return to Sweden. His assistant coach Jakob Vestergaard then took over as head coach after Ryde.

Ryde took over the position as head coach of the Romanian women's national team by mid-March 2015 after being previously eyed for Romania Women job in 2008.

On 4 October 2016, the Romanian Handball Federation (FRH) and Ryde have reached an agreement to terminate the employment contract by mutual agreement after 16 months. Ryde will now dedicate himself to a business career.

== Coaching honours ==
- Elitserien:
  - Winner: N/A
- Swedish Cup:
  - Winner: N/A
- Danish League:
  - Winner: 2006, 2008
- Danish Cup:
  - Winner: 2007, 2008
- Women's EHF Champions League:
  - Winner: 2006
- EHF Women's Champions Trophy:
  - Winner: 2006
- IHF World Women's Handball Championship:
  - Bronze medalist: 2015

== Personal life ==
Tomas lives in Lidingö and has three children with his wife Marie. He's a former police officer.
