= Ramona Farcău =

Romanian handball player (born 1979)

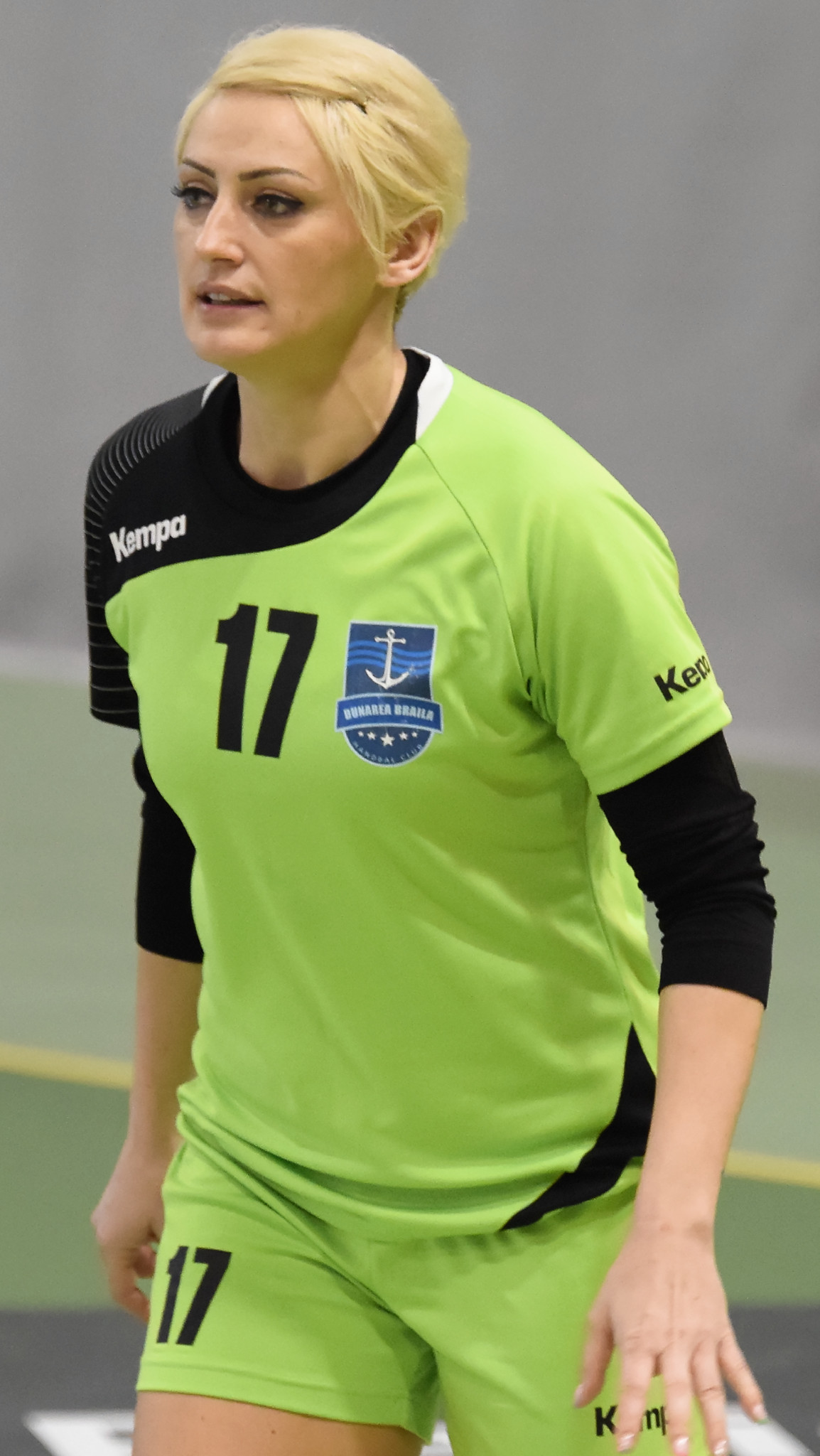
- Farcău in 2015

Personal information
- Full name: Ramona Petruţa Farcău
- Born: 14 July 1979 (age 47) Zalău, Romania
- Height: 1.70 m (5 ft 7 in)

Sport
- Sport: Handball
- Position: Right/Left wing

Senior clubs
- Years: Team
- 1998–2006: HC Zalău
- 2006–2013: CS Oltchim Râmnicu Vâlcea
- 2013–2015: HC Dunărea Brăila
- 2015–2016: CSM Ploiești
- 2016–2017: Dinamo București
National team
Years	Team	Apps	(Gls)
1999–2011	Romania	214	(689)
Medal record
Junior World Championship
Gold medal – first place	1999 China
World Championship
Silver medal – second place	2005 Russia

Ramona Farcău (former Maier; born 14 July 1979) is a Romanian retired handballer. She competed at the 2008 Summer Olympics in Beijing, where she was top goalscorer with a total of 56 goals, and also voted into the All-star team. She also competed at the 2000 Summer Olympics.

== International honours ==
- EHF Champions League:
  - Finalist: 2010
  - Semifinalist: 2009, 2012, 2013
- EHF Champions Trophy:
  - Winner: 2007
- EHF Cup Winners' Cup:
  - Winner: 2007
- World Championship:
  - Silver Medalist: 2005
  - Fourth Place: 2007

== Individual awards ==
- Romanian National League Top Scorer: 2005
