= 1962 World Women's Handball Championship =

1962 edition of the World Women's Handball Championship

Tournament details
- Host country: Romania
- Dates: 7 July – 15 July
- Teams: 9

Final positions
- Champions: Romania (1st title)
- Runners-up: Denmark
- Third place: Czechoslovakia

Tournament statistics
- Matches played: 21
- Goals scored: 316 (15.05 per match)
- Top scorers: (Czech Republic) Marie Mateju (Romania) Ana Starck (14 goals)

The 1962 World Women's Handball Championship was the second Women's Handball World Championship. It took place in Romania in 1962.

As five years earlier, the competition was played with only seven players on the field, outdoor, on clay, in broad daylight and in two 20-minutes half-times. For the first time a non-European team, namely Japan, entered the competition.

== Preliminary round ==
=== Group A ===
Pos	Team	Pld	W	D	L	GF	GA	GD	Pts
1	Czechoslovakia	2	1	1	0	23	12	+11	3
2	Soviet Union	2	1	0	1	16	24	−8	2
3	West Germany	2	0	1	1	15	18	−3	1

Source: IHF

Soviet Union	11–8	West Germany
Czechoslovakia	7–7	West Germany
Czechoslovakia	16–5	Soviet Union

=== Group B ===
Pos	Team	Pld	W	D	L	GF	GA	GD	Pts
1	Denmark	2	2	0	0	20	11	+9	4
2	Hungary	2	1	0	1	21	16	+5	2
3	Japan	2	0	0	2	15	29	−14	0

Source: IHF

Hungary	17–8	Japan
Denmark	8–4	Hungary
Denmark	12–7	Japan

=== Group C ===
Pos	Team	Pld	W	D	L	GF	GA	GD	Pts
1	Romania	2	1	1	0	12	7	+5	3
2	Yugoslavia	2	1	1	0	8	5	+3	3
3	Poland	2	0	0	2	6	14	−8	0

Source: IHF

Romania	9–4	Poland
Yugoslavia	5–2	Poland
Romania	3–3	Yugoslavia

== Main round ==
Team will compete for Places 1–2
Team will compete for Places 3–4

=== Group I ===
Pos	Team	Pld	W	D	L	GF	GA	GD	Pts
1	Romania	2	2	0	0	16	10	+6	4
2	Czechoslovakia	2	1	0	1	9	12	−3	2
3	Hungary	2	0	0	2	12	15	−3	0

Source: IHF

Romania	9–7	Hungary
Czechoslovakia	6–5	Hungary
Romania	7–3	Czechoslovakia

=== Group II ===
Pos	Team	Pld	W	D	L	GF	GA	GD	Pts
1	Denmark	2	2	0	0	17	9	+8	4
2	Yugoslavia	2	1	0	1	15	12	+3	2
3	Soviet Union	2	0	0	2	9	20	−11	0

Source: IHF

Yugoslavia	10–5	Soviet Union
Denmark	10–4	Soviet Union
Denmark	7–5	Yugoslavia

== Classification round ==
Pos	Team	Pld	W	D	L	GF	GA	GD	Pts
7	Poland	2	2	0	0	21	14	+7	4
8	West Germany	2	1	0	1	19	11	+8	2
9	Japan	2	0	0	2	16	31	−15	0

Source: IHF

Poland	16–10	Japan
West Germany	15–6	Japan
Poland	5–4	West Germany

== Finals ==
Date
14.07.1962	5/6	Hungary	12–10	Soviet Union
15.07.1962	3/4	Czechoslovakia	6–5	Yugoslavia
15.07.1962	Final	Romania	8–5	Denmark

== Final standings ==
Rank	Team
Gold medal	Romania
Silver medal	Denmark
Bronze medal	Czechoslovakia
4	Yugoslavia
5	Hungary
6	Soviet Union
7	Poland
8	West Germany
9	Japan

1962 Women's World Champions

Romania
First Title

Team Roster

Liliana Borcea, Ana Starck, Edeltraut Franz, Iuliana Naco, Aurelia Szoke-Sălăgeanu, Constanţa Dumitraşcu, Antoaneta Oţelea-Vasile, Felicia Gheorghiţă, Irina Nagy, Cornelia Constantinescu, Aurora Leonte-Niculescu, Iozefina Ugron, Martina Constantinescu-Scheip, Elena Hedesiu, Victoria Dumitrescu and Anna Nemetz-Schauberger.
Trainers: Constantin Popescu, Niculae Nedeff
