= Bogdan Macovei (handball coach) =

Romanian handball coach (1953–2021)

Personal information
- Full name: Bogdan Iulian Macovei
- Nationality: Romanian
- Born: 1953 Drăgoiești, Suceava County, România
- Died: 11 January 2021 (aged 67–68) Timișoara, Romania

Sport
- Sport: Handball

Teams managed
- –: Romania (women's)
- –: Kometal Gjorče Petrov Skopje (women's)
- –: Macedonia (women's)
- –: Oltchim Râmnicu Vâlcea (women's)
- –: Romania (women's)
- –: RK Pelister (men's)

Bogdan Iulian Macovei (1953 – 11 January 2021) was a Romanian handball manager, sports expert and author of books on handball, and European Handball Federation lecturer.

== Career ==
He graduated from the I.E.F.S.

Macovei is best known for his time as Romania manager twice. He managed his country to 4th place in the 1999 World Championship and to 7th place in the 1990 World Championship and the 2000 Olympic Games respectively. After, in the 2010s, he managed RK Pelister, leading them to a European final in the 2001–02 EHF Challenge Cup for the first time in the club's history.

Joining Oltchim Râmnicu Vâlcea, he won back-to-back league titles (1999 and 2000) and the silver medal in 2001. Previously at club level, Macovei become the manager of Kometal Gjorče Petrov Skopje guiding them to the EHF Champions League quarter-finals. He also managed Macedonia to 7th place in the 1997.

After retirement Bogdan Macovei worked for the Romanian Handball Federation.
