= GF World Cup '10 =

International women's handball competition

The GF World Cup '10 was held in Århus, Denmark on September 21-26. It was an invitational women's handball tournament organized by the Danish Handball Association.

The tournament is said to be the world's most prestigious non-IHF tournament for women. Romania was the last winner of GF World Cup, after beating Norway in the last year final, 28–27. In the same exact final Romania again had the better end by defeating Norway 24–23.

== Competition ==
=== Group A ===
Team	Pld	W	D	L	GF	GA	GD	Pts
Romania	3	2	1	0	80	71	+9	5
Norway	3	2	0	1	81	65	+16	4
Sweden	3	1	1	1	75	82	−7	3
Russia	3	0	0	3	69	87	−18	0

All times are Central European Summer Time (UTC+2)

September 21, 2010; 14:00	Russia	24 – 25	Sweden	NRGi Arena; Attendance: 200; Referees: Christiansen, Lythje (Denmark)
September 21, 2010; 14:00	Gorshenina 5	(12–12)	Fredén, Helleberg 5	NRGi Arena; Attendance: 200; Referees: Christiansen, Lythje (Denmark)
September 21, 2010; 14:00	3× (yellow card) 6× (suspension)	Report	3× (yellow card) 2× (suspension)	NRGi Arena; Attendance: 200; Referees: Christiansen, Lythje (Denmark)

September 21, 2010; 18:00	Norway	20 – 21	Romania	NRGi Arena; Attendance: 500; Referees: Pavicevic, Raznatovic (Montenegro)
September 21, 2010; 18:00	Alstad, Riegelhuth 4	(12–6)	Neagu 8	NRGi Arena; Attendance: 500; Referees: Pavicevic, Raznatovic (Montenegro)
September 21, 2010; 18:00	3× (yellow card) 4× (suspension)	Report	2× (yellow card) 3× (suspension)	NRGi Arena; Attendance: 500; Referees: Pavicevic, Raznatovic (Montenegro)

September 22, 2010; 14:00	Russia	24 – 32	Romania	NRGi Arena; Referees: Hansen, Gjeding (Denmark)
September 22, 2010; 14:00	Sen 7	(9–15)	Neagu 6	NRGi Arena; Referees: Hansen, Gjeding (Denmark)
September 22, 2010; 14:00	2× (yellow card) 2× (suspension)	Report	3× (yellow card) 3× (suspension)	NRGi Arena; Referees: Hansen, Gjeding (Denmark)

September 22, 2010; 18:00	Sweden	23 – 31	Norway	NRGi Arena; Attendance: 1,048; Referees: Stark, Stefan (Romania)
September 22, 2010; 18:00	Torstenson 5	(11–16)	Frafjord 7	NRGi Arena; Attendance: 1,048; Referees: Stark, Stefan (Romania)
September 22, 2010; 18:00	2× (yellow card) 1× (suspension)	Report	3× (yellow card) 4× (suspension)	NRGi Arena; Attendance: 1,048; Referees: Stark, Stefan (Romania)

September 23, 2010; 14:00	Romania	27 – 27	Sweden	NRGi Arena; Attendance: 382; Referees: Hansen, Gjeding (Denmark)
September 23, 2010; 14:00	Amariei 7	(14–12)	Gulldén 7	NRGi Arena; Attendance: 382; Referees: Hansen, Gjeding (Denmark)
September 23, 2010; 14:00	2× (yellow card)	Report	1× (yellow card) 4× (suspension)	NRGi Arena; Attendance: 382; Referees: Hansen, Gjeding (Denmark)

September 23, 2010; 18:00	Russia	21 – 30	Norway	NRGi Arena; Referees: Lythje, Christiansen (Denmark)
September 23, 2010; 18:00	Vetkova 4	(14–11)	Molid 5	NRGi Arena; Referees: Lythje, Christiansen (Denmark)
September 23, 2010; 18:00	2× (yellow card) 3× (suspension)	Report	3× (yellow card) 3× (suspension)	NRGi Arena; Referees: Lythje, Christiansen (Denmark)

=== Group B ===
Team	Pld	W	D	L	GF	GA	GD	Pts
Denmark	3	2	0	1	79	80	−1	4
France	3	2	0	1	97	87	+10	4
Hungary	3	1	0	2	72	76	−4	2
Germany	3	1	0	2	75	80	−5	2

All times are Central European Summer Time (UTC+2)

September 21, 2010; 16:00	Hungary	22 – 19	Germany	NRGi Arena; Referees: Hansen, Gjeding (Denmark)
September 21, 2010; 16:00	Görbicz 8	(9–10)	Jurack 5	NRGi Arena; Referees: Hansen, Gjeding (Denmark)
September 21, 2010; 16:00	3× (yellow card) 3× (suspension)	Report	3× (yellow card) 5× (suspension)	NRGi Arena; Referees: Hansen, Gjeding (Denmark)

September 21, 2010; 20:00	Denmark	32 – 29	France	NRGi Arena; Attendance: 1,549; Referees: Stark, Stefan (Romania)
September 21, 2010; 20:00	Troelsen 7	(15–13)	Pineau 6	NRGi Arena; Attendance: 1,549; Referees: Stark, Stefan (Romania)
September 21, 2010; 20:00	3× (yellow card) 3× (suspension)	Report	3× (yellow card) 1× (suspension)	NRGi Arena; Attendance: 1,549; Referees: Stark, Stefan (Romania)

September 22, 2010; 16:00	Germany	29 – 39	France	NRGi Arena; Referees: Lythje, Christiansen (Denmark)
September 22, 2010; 16:00	Richter 6	Report	Baudouin 7	NRGi Arena; Referees: Lythje, Christiansen (Denmark)
September 22, 2010; 16:00	3× (yellow card) 3× (suspension)		3× (yellow card) 7× (suspension)	NRGi Arena; Referees: Lythje, Christiansen (Denmark)

September 22, 2010; 20:00	Denmark	28 – 24	Hungary	NRGi Arena; Attendance: 2,123; Referees: Raznatovic, Pavicevic (Montenegro)
September 22, 2010; 20:00	Lyksborg 8	(11–10)	Görbicz 6	NRGi Arena; Attendance: 2,123; Referees: Raznatovic, Pavicevic (Montenegro)
September 22, 2010; 20:00	3× (yellow card) 5× (suspension)	Report	3× (yellow card) 5× (suspension)	NRGi Arena; Attendance: 2,123; Referees: Raznatovic, Pavicevic (Montenegro)

September 23, 2010; 16:00	France	29 – 26	Hungary	NRGi Arena; Attendance: 450; Referees: Raznatovic, Pavicevic (Montenegro)
September 23, 2010; 16:00	Ayglon 4	(14–12)	Görbicz 8	NRGi Arena; Attendance: 450; Referees: Raznatovic, Pavicevic (Montenegro)
September 23, 2010; 16:00	3× (yellow card) 5× (suspension)	Report	3× (yellow card) 6× (suspension)	NRGi Arena; Attendance: 450; Referees: Raznatovic, Pavicevic (Montenegro)

September 23, 2010; 20:00	Denmark	19 – 27	Germany	NRGi Arena; Attendance: 2,547; Referees: Stark, Stefan (Romania)
September 23, 2010; 20:00	Thorsgaard, Brøgger Led, Kristensen 4	(10–10)	Wörz, Althaus 5	NRGi Arena; Attendance: 2,547; Referees: Stark, Stefan (Romania)
September 23, 2010; 20:00	1× (yellow card) 3× (suspension)	Report	2× (yellow card) 2× (suspension)	NRGi Arena; Attendance: 2,547; Referees: Stark, Stefan (Romania)

=== Knockout stage ===
Semifinals
September 25, 2010 - 14:15
France	21
Romania	23
September 25, 2010 - 16:15
Denmark	19
Norway	24

Final
September 26, 2010 - 16:15
Romania	24
Norway	23
Bronze Match
September 26, 2010 - 14:15
France	28
Denmark	26

==== Semifinals ====
September 25, 2010; 14:15	France	21 – 23	Romania	NRGi Arena; Attendance: 1,800; Referees: Hansen, Gjeding (Denmark)
September 25, 2010; 14:15	Mendy 4	(7–15)	Neagu 8	NRGi Arena; Attendance: 1,800; Referees: Hansen, Gjeding (Denmark)
September 25, 2010; 14:15	3× (yellow card) 1× (suspension)	Report	3× (yellow card) 2× (suspension)	NRGi Arena; Attendance: 1,800; Referees: Hansen, Gjeding (Denmark)

September 25, 2010; 16:15	Denmark	19 – 24	Norway	NRGi Arena; Attendance: 2,208; Referees: Raznatovic, Pavicevic (Montenegro)
September 25, 2010; 16:15	Kristiansen 5	(9–15)	Alstad, Nøstvold 5	NRGi Arena; Attendance: 2,208; Referees: Raznatovic, Pavicevic (Montenegro)
September 25, 2010; 16:15	3× (yellow card) 3× (suspension)	Report	2× (yellow card) 3× (suspension)	NRGi Arena; Attendance: 2,208; Referees: Raznatovic, Pavicevic (Montenegro)

==== Bronze medal match ====
September 26, 2010; 14:15	France	28 – 26	Denmark	NRGi Arena

==== Final ====
September 26, 2010; 16:15	Romania	24 – 23	Norway	NRGi Arena

=== All-Star Team ===
- Goalkeeper: (Norway) Katrine Lunde
- Left Wing: (Romania) Valentina Ardean-Elisei
- Left Back: (Romania) Cristina Neagu
- Center Back: (Hungary) Anita Görbicz
- Right Back: (Denmark) Camilla Dalby
- Right Wing: (Norway) Linn-Kristin Riegelhuth
- Line Player: (Norway) Marit Malm Frafjord
- MVP: (Romania) Cristina Neagu
