= Iozefina Ștefănescu =

Romanian handball player (1932 – 2015)

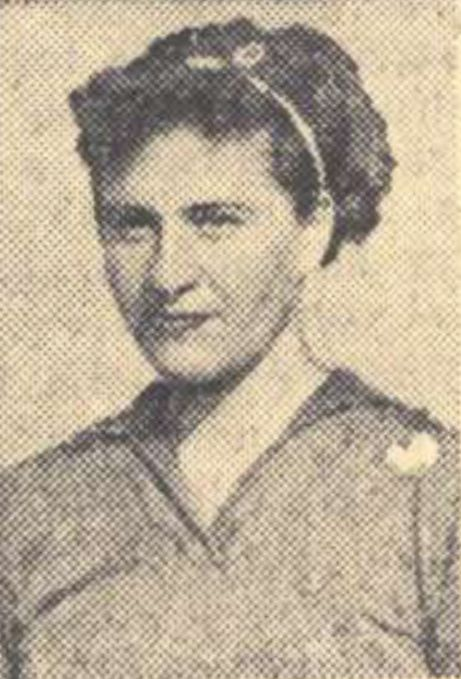

Personal information
- Nationality: Romanian
- Born: 3 January 1932 Covasna, Romania
- Died: 25 October 2015 (aged 83)

Sport
- Sport: Handball
- Position: Centre back
National team
- Years: Team
- –: Romania
Medal record
Outdoor World Championship
Gold medal – first place	1956 West Germany
Gold medal – first place	1960 Netherlands
Indoor World Championship
Gold medal – first place	1962 Romania

Iozefina Ștefănescu (Hungarian: Ugron Jozefina; née Ugron; 3 January 1932 – 25 October 2015) was a Romanian handballer who played for the Romanian national team. She was the captain of the Romania national team that won the 1962 IHF World Championship. At club level, she played for ICEF București or Știința București.

== International trophies ==
- Outdoor World Championship
  - Gold Medalist: 1956, 1960
- Indoor World Championship:
  - Gold Medalist: 1962
