= Marilena Doiciu =

Romanian handball player (born 1967)

Personal information
- Nationality: Romanian
- Born: 3 July 1967 (age 59) Bucharest, Romania

Sport
- Sport: Handball
- Position: Left wing
- Current club: Retired
National team
Years	Team	Apps	(Gls)
–	Romania	237	(513)

Marilena Doiciu (born 3 July 1967) is a Romanian former handballer who played for the Romania national team. She also competed in the 1993 World Championship, being part of the Romanian team which finished 4th. She most notably played for Rapid București, captaining the club for many years, and was also the captain of Romania.

== International trophies ==
- IHF Cup:
  - Winner: 1993
