= Niculae Nedeff =

Romanian handball player (1928-2017)

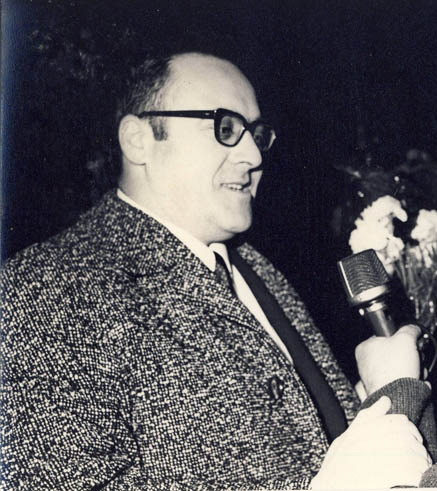
Niculae Nedeff

Niculae Nedeff (26 September 1928 – 24 July 2017) was a Romanian handball player and coach of the Romania women's national handball team and Romania men's national handball team. He won the World Championships seven times, three times with the girls' team and four times with the boys' team.

Born in Bucharest, Nedeff studied at Institutul de Cultura Fizica.

After retiring, he joined the Executive Committee of the Romanian Olympic Committee.
