= Valentina Cozma =

Romanian handball player (born 1963)

Personal information
- Full name: Valentina Cozma
- Nationality: (Romania) Romanian
- Born: 14 August 1963 (age 63) Iaşi, Romania

Sport
- Sport: Handball
- Position: Pivot
- Current club: Retired

Senior clubs
- Years: Team
- –: (Romania) Terom Iaşi
- 1991–1992: (France) SUN AL Bouillargues
- –: (Romania) Oltchim Vâlcea
- 1993–1995: (France) HBC Nîmes
- 1995–1999: (Croatia) Podravka Koprivnica
- 1999-2000: (Romania) Oltchim Vâlcea
- 2005: (France) ESC Yutz
National team
| Years | Team | Apps | (Gls) |
| 1979-1999 | Romania | 322 | (980) |

Valentina Cozma (born 14 August 1963) is a retired Romanian handball player, considered one of the best pivots in the history of Romanian handball.

== Achievements ==
International competitions

- EHF Champions League

Winners (1): 1996

- Champions Trophy

Winners (1): 1996

National competitions

- Championship of Romania

Winners (4): 1991, 1993, 1994, 2000

- Romanian Cup

Winners (4): 1992, 1993, 1994, 1995

- Championship of Croatia

Winners (4): 1996, 1997, 1998, 1999

- Croatian Cup

Winners (4): 1996, 1997, 1998, 1999
