= IHF World Women's Handball Championship =

International handball tournament for women's national teams

- Current season, competition or edition: 2025 World Women's Handball Championship
- Sport: Handball
- Founded: 1957; 69 years ago
- No. of teams: 32 (finals)
- Continent: International (IHF)
- Most recent champion: Norway (5th title)
- Most titles: Russia (Note: Russia's total includes seven titles as Soviet Union and Russia.) (7 titles)

The IHF Women's Handball World Championship has been organized by the International Handball Federation since 1957. European teams have won every time except in 1995 where South Korea won as the first team outside Europe and in 2013 where Brazil won as the first American team.

Nine teams participated in the first championship; this number has grown in steps to 32 (from 2021). In 1977, a B-tournament was introduced and later in 1986, a C-tournament which served as qualification for the real championship or A-tournament. Since 2021, the championship has expanded to the current system with 32 national teams, divided into eight groups of four. The B- and C-tournament qualifications were replaced by the present qualification system based on continental confederations in 1993.

Since 1993 it has been held every other year. Between 1978 and 1990, the championship was held every fourth year, alternating with the Olympic tournament (introduced for women's handball in 1976). The first five tournaments were held in the summer or early fall whereas the rest have been held in November or December.

In the combined calculation, including the medals and results it has inherited, Russia is the most successful nation with seven titles while Norway has five world championship titles.

Norwegian national team player Katrine Lunde (Haraldsen) is the only athlete to have won seven medals. Lunde represented Norway for 22 years. She made her first appearance at the World Championship in 2003 and retired at the 2025 championship at the age of 45.

== History ==
=== 1957–1970: Beginning ===
After the first men's indoor World Championship in 1938, women had to wait until 1949 for their first international competition, largely due to World War II. This inaugural tournament was played outdoors with eleven players per side. Hungary, the host nation, won the competition. Two further editions of the eleven-a-side women's World Championship were held in 1956 and 1960, both won by Romania.

The first seven-a-side World Championship took place in 1957 in Yugoslavia, featuring nine European teams. Although designated as a World Championship, only European teams participated in this edition. While still played outdoors, it marked the first official competition with seven-a-side teams, distinguishing it from the previous eleven-a-side tournaments. Approximately 8,000 spectators attended the final, where Czechoslovakia defeated Hungary 7–1.

The first non-European team, Japan, participated in the 1962 edition, held in Romania. Matches were played outdoors on clay courts during the day, in two twenty-minute halves. Romanian coaches Constantine Popescu and Niculae Nedeff guided the host team to victory, defeating Denmark 8–5 in the final.

From the 1965 edition, hosted by West Germany, all matches were held indoors. Eight teams participated, divided into two groups of four. The group winners advanced to the final, where Hungary claimed its first title by defeating Yugoslavia 5–3. The host nation, West Germany, finished in third place.

The 1968 edition, originally scheduled for November, was canceled in August by the IHF following the Warsaw Pact invasion of Czechoslovakia. Nine teams had qualified, including only one non-European team, Japan. In December 1968, the USSR organized an unofficial replacement tournament featuring four of the nine qualified teams. Since no country expressed interest in hosting a full championship, no women's World Championship was held in 1969 or 1970.

=== 1970–1990: Domination of East Germany and Soviet Union ===
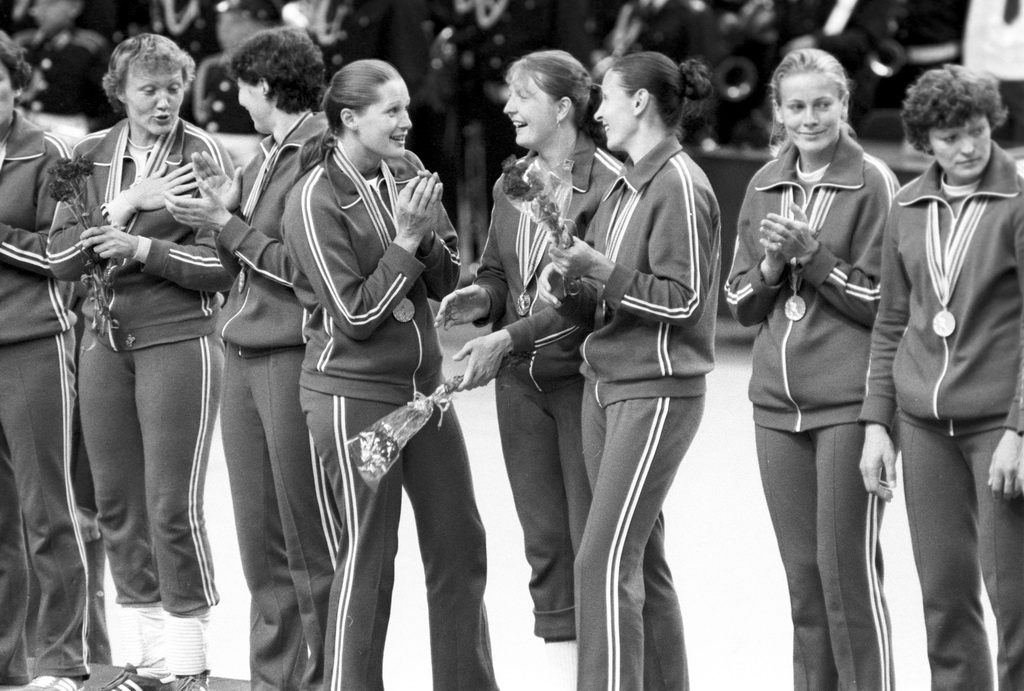
USSR women's national handball team at the 1980 Summer Olympics

Two teams dominated women's handball competitions in the 1970s and 1980s: East Germany and then the Soviet Union. In 1971, nine teams were divided into three groups of three. The top two teams from each group advanced to a main round consisting of two groups, with the first-, second-, and third-place teams meeting respectively for the final and the classification matches for third and fifth place. This edition marked East Germany's first title, defeating Yugoslavia 11–8 in the final.

Two years later, in a competition with twelve teams, Yugoslavia took revenge by winning the 1973 World Championship on home soil. This edition also marked the rise of the Soviet Union, which defeated the defending East German champions in the group stage and finished in third place, achieving their first podium finish. Yugoslavia claimed its first title after previous final losses in 1965 and 1971, defeating Romania 16–11 in the final.

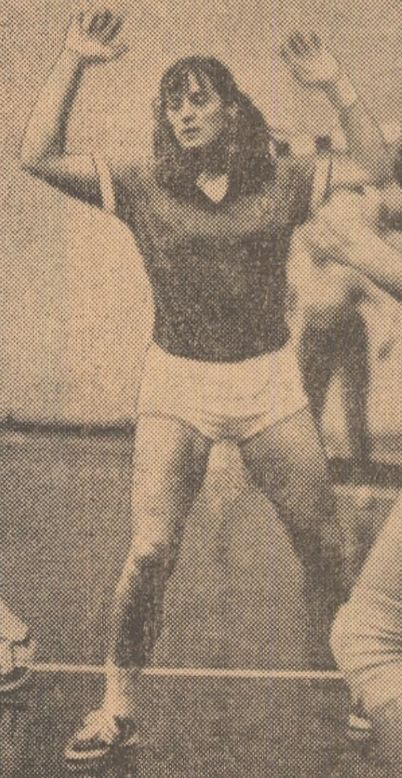
Kristina Richter, the three-time world champion. She was inducted into Germany's Sports Hall of Fame in July 2016.

The 1975 tournament, held in the Soviet Union, saw East Germany emerge victorious ahead of the host nation. With no knockout matches or finals, the title was decided based on the draw between East Germany and the USSR (10–10) early in the competition, and, crucially, the Soviet defeat to Hungary, which allowed the East Germans to claim their second title after 1971 without defeating their closest rival. For the first time, the United States and Tunisia participated, representing their continents at this level. The tournament also served as the qualifying event for the first women's handball tournament at the 1976 Olympic Games, which was won by the Soviet Union, who later repeated the achievement at the 1980 Olympics.

A similar situation occurred in 1978. The reigning world champions, East Germany, lost to the Soviet Union in the final group stage (12–14), but the Soviets’ one-goal loss (10–11) to Czechoslovakia in the preliminary round allowed East Germany to be crowned champions for the third time of the decade. Hungary completed the podium. Two players left a significant mark on the tournament: Waltraud Kretzschmar, captain of the East German team, and Zinaida Turchyna of Spartak Kyiv, who led the Soviet squad. In addition to Kretzschmar, four other East German players became three-time world champions: Hannelore Burosch, Kristina Richter, Petra Uhlig and Hannelore Zober.

At the 1982 World Championship, the Soviet Union confirmed its dominance, winning its first world title. Turchyna's teammates won all their matches except for a final inconsequential match against Hungary, which allowed the Hungarians to take the silver medal. Yugoslavia earned bronze, while East Germany, in decline, finished just off the podium. This edition also marked the arrival of South Korea at the highest level, finishing sixth, signaling the emergence of competitive teams outside Europe and the continued globalization of handball.

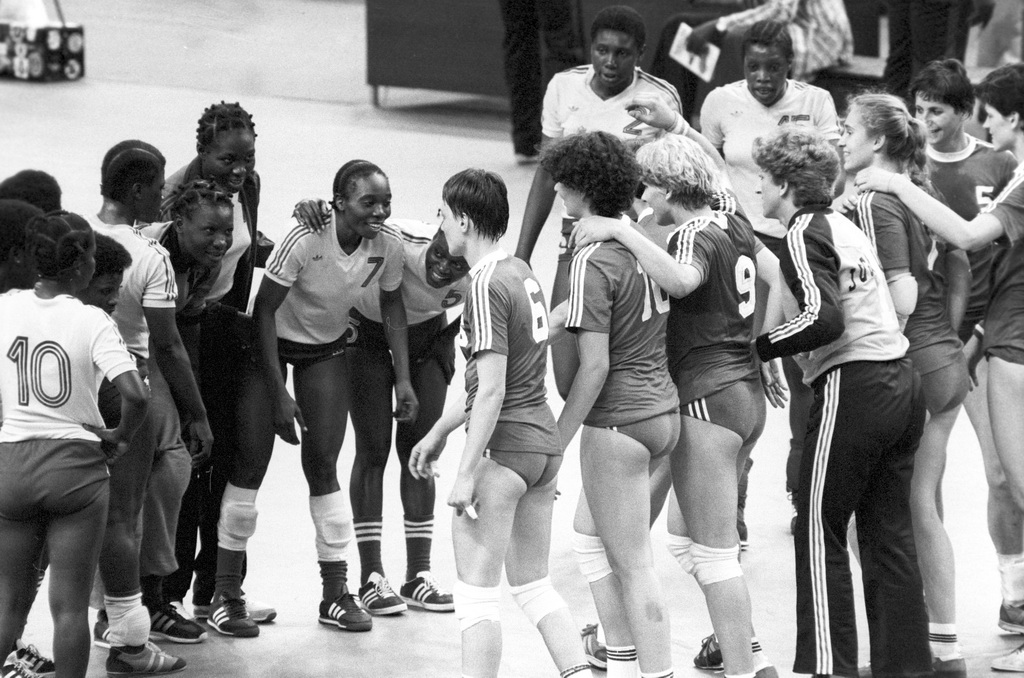
Yugoslavia (right) vs. Congo (left) at the 1980 Olympic Games. Wearing number 9 for Yugoslavia is Svetlana Kitić, considered the greatest handball player of all time by the IHF.

This development likely contributed to the expansion from twelve to sixteen teams for the 1986 World Championship. The Soviet team, still led by Zinaida Turchyna, defeated Czechoslovakia 30–22 in the final, retaining their title from 1982. In the third-place match, Norway defeated East Germany 23–19, achieving its first podium finish at the world level.

The 1990 World Championship was the last edition of the Cold War era. Although German reunification had occurred two months earlier in October, two German teams still participated, with the former East Germany defeating the former West Germany 25–19 in the third-place match, a result rich in symbolic significance. The tournament was also the first held outside Europe, in South Korea. The host Koreans, who had sensationally won the Olympic title in Seoul two years earlier, were favorites but finished in a disappointing eleventh place. Reflecting the dominance of Eastern Bloc countries, the USSR and Yugoslavia met in the final after dominating their opponents. Although the Soviets quickly took a 4-goal (9–5) and later 6-goal lead (17–11), the Yugoslavs closed the gap to one goal with 12 minutes remaining (20–19). However, the USSR quickly restored a three-goal margin to ultimately win 24–22, securing their third consecutive title. Soviet player Maryna Bazanova became the sixth athlete to achieve three world championship titles.

=== 1990–2000: The emergence of the Scandinavian national teams ===
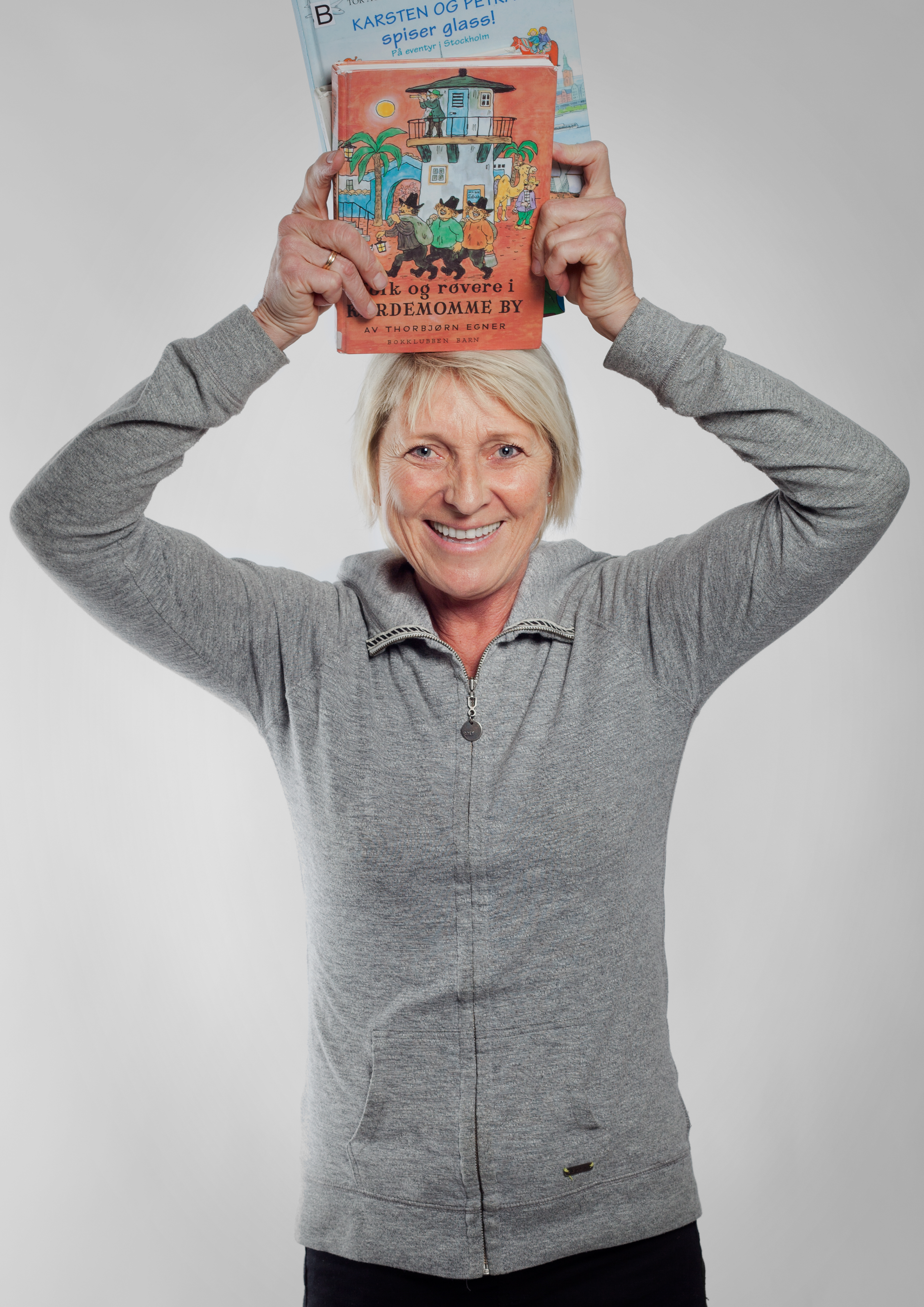
Marit Breivik coached the team from 1994 to 2009. During her tenure, the team won six gold medals in international championships.

The Norwegian women's handball team, finalists at the 1992 Summer Olympics, hosted the 1993 Women's Handball World Championship with the ambition of winning, at home, their first title in the competition. The Russian women's handball team, struggling throughout the tournament, nevertheless achieved an important victory against the host nation (19–14), depriving Norway of a place in the final. Norway was edged out on goal difference by the Denmark, led by Anja Andersen, even though Norway had defeated them in the last match of the main round. The second team to qualify for the final was the Germany, coached by Lothar Doering, an Olympic champion in 1980 as a player. This is the first championship in which a unified Germany appeared. Germany managed to overcome a mediocre start to the tournament – finishing third in their preliminary-round group – by achieving a perfect record in the main round. The final turned out to be one of the tightest in the history of the competition up to that point. Sixty minutes were not enough to separate the two teams, and the match went into extra time. Despite their dominance, the Danish side failed to pull away, and the Germans stayed close. During the overtime, Lothar Doering brought on Karen Heinrich, who had until then played an unremarkable tournament, but who would go on to give Germany a 22–21 victory. In the bronze medal match, Norway consoled themselves by winning a narrow 20–19 victory over Romania. Despite finishing 2nd, the World Championship marked the beginning of the Danish Golden generation known as the Iron Ladies.

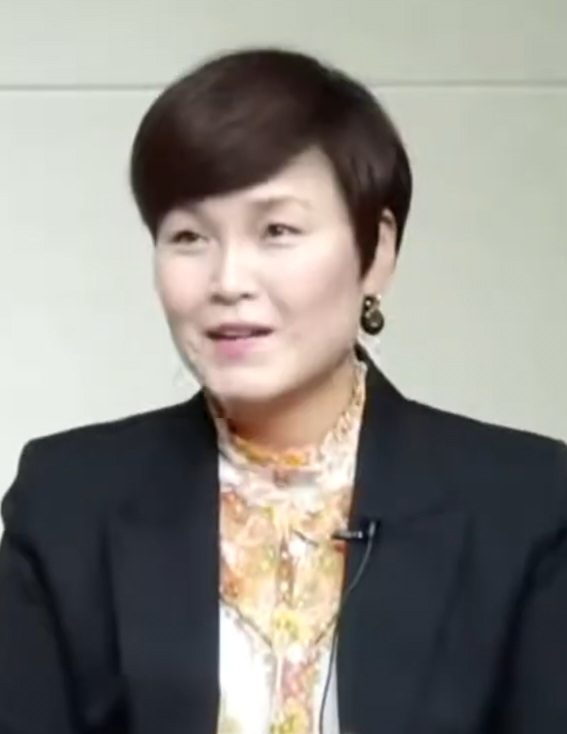
Lim O-kyeong gold medalist at the 1995 World Championship and World Handball Player of the Year in 1996.

Two years later, the 1995 World Championship was marked by innovation. Co-hosted for the first time by Austria and Hungary, the competition adopted a new biennial format and was expanded to twenty teams. These were divided into four groups of five in the preliminary round, with the top three from each group advancing to a knockout stage starting from the round of 16. The remaining spots were decided through playoff matches. As expected, the quarterfinals were dominated by European teams, joined only by South Korea. In the semi-finals, however, the favorites – Denmark and Norway – were eliminated by South Korea (33–31) and Hungary (22–21) respectively. The South Koreans, who had already defeated the defending champions Germany twice during the tournament, displayed a full-court, speed-based style of play never before seen. In the final, held as scheduled in Vienna, Hungary failed to contain the fast-paced game of the Asian players and logically lost 25–20. South Korea thus won its first world title – the first-ever victory by a non-European team in the history of the competition.

In the 1997 World Championship, the tournament was again expanded – this time to 24 teams – matching the format of the men's championship. Four groups of six were formed for the preliminary round, with the top four advancing to the round of 16. Some favorites, such as Romania, Austria, and Hungary, were eliminated early. In the quarterfinals, the defending champions South Korea were knocked out. Previously unbeaten in the competition, Germany, the host nation, lost in the semi-finals to Norway (23–25). During the other semi-final, a drunken German spectator stabbed three Danish supporters, two of whom later died from their injuries. The tournament was on the verge of being canceled, but ultimately continued, and Denmark advanced to a historic all-Scandinavian final, where they easily defeated Norway 33–20. Already Olympic champions (1996) and European champions (1996), the Danes thus achieved a historic treble. Germany finished third after defeating Russia 27–25 in the placement match.

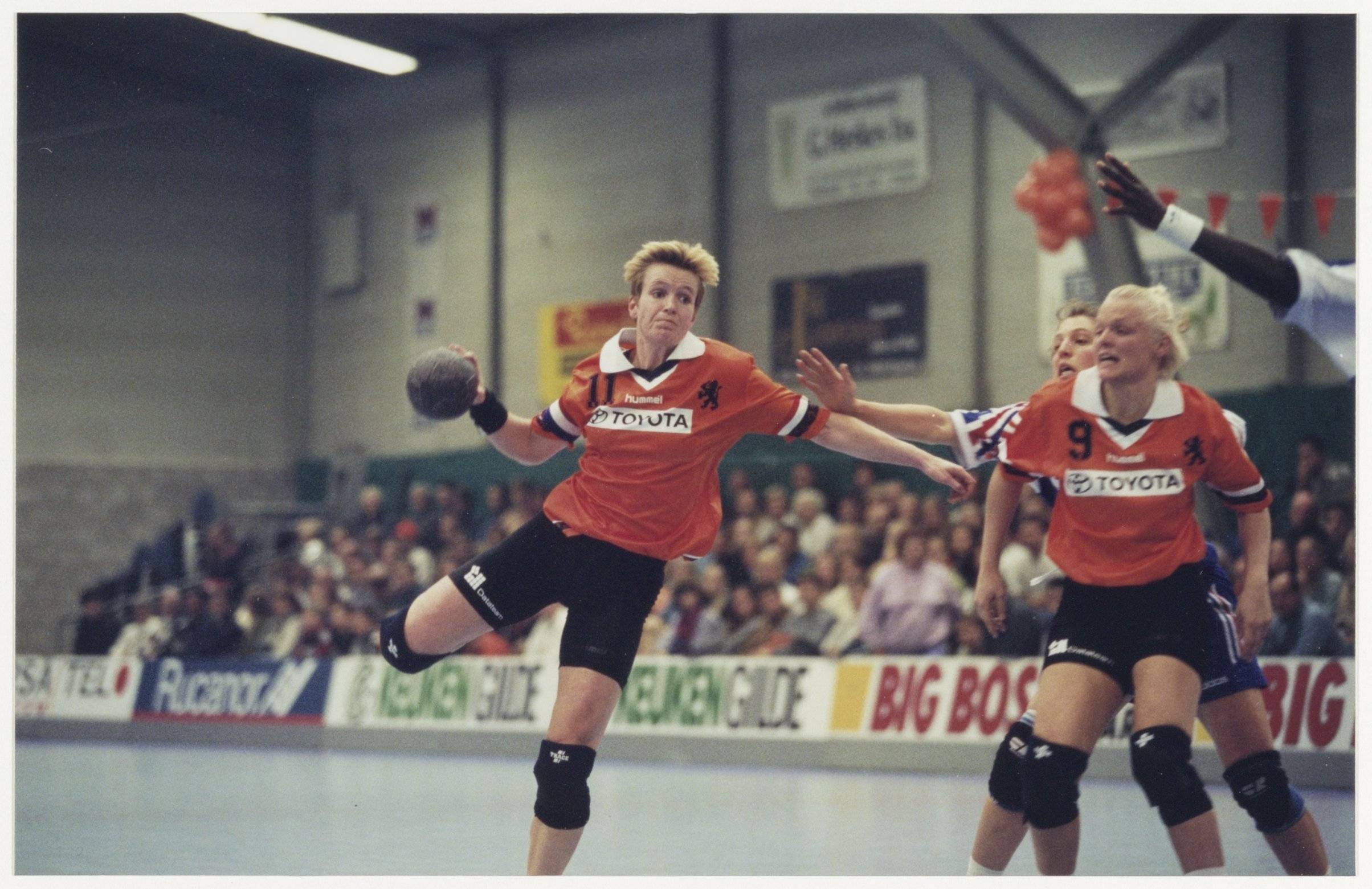
The Netherlands – France match at the 1997 Championship.

Two years later, the two 1997 finalists co-hosted the 1999 World Championship, with no change in format. The home tournament turned into a disappointment for the defending champions Denmark, who were eliminated by France in the quarterfinals (19–17 after extra time). In the semi-finals, Norway outclassed Austria (30–18) to reach the final once again, as in the previous edition. In the other semi-final, France, newcomers at this level of competition, eliminated Romania (18–17), securing their first-ever podium finish at a World Championship. In a very tight final, it took two periods of extra time to decide the winner (18–18 after regulation, then 21–21 after the first overtime), with Norway ultimately prevailing 25–24 – their first-ever world title, and yet another new champion in the sport's history.

=== 2000–2010: Russian domination ===
The 2001 World Championship was held in Italy, with no change to the format. In this edition, Russia finished as champions and undefeated after successively eliminating Italy, Hungary, and Denmark, before defeating the defending champions Norway—also unbeaten and impressive up to that point—in the final (30–25). FR Yugoslavia won third place thanks to its victory over Denmark, 42–40 after extra time, in what remains one of the highest-scoring matches in the history of the knockout stages.

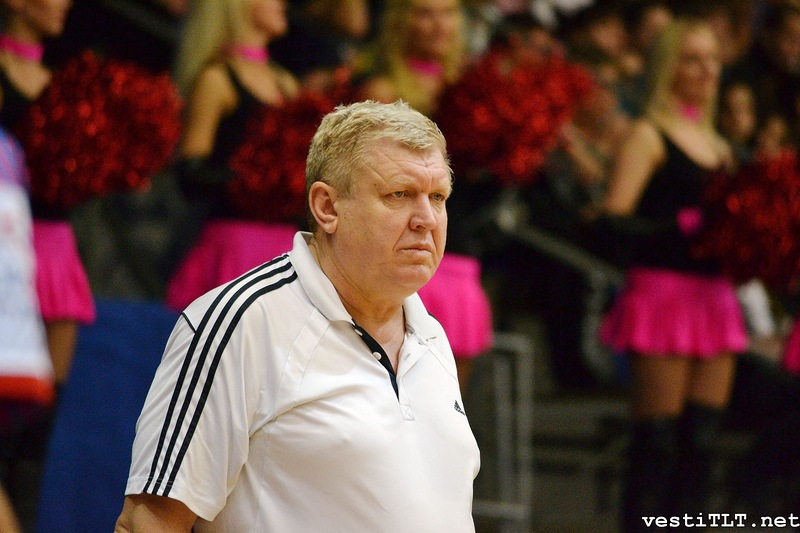
Yevgeni Trefilov King tref, the four-time world champion with the Russian national team.

Since the single-elimination system starting from the round of 16 did not meet with unanimous approval, the format was changed for the 2003 World Championship in Croatia. The 24 participants were first divided into four groups of six teams in a preliminary round; the top three from each group qualified for a main round composed of two groups of six, with the first- and second-placed teams then facing each other in cross semi-finals. This format made it possible to smooth out the impact of an off-day. Thus, the France, despite a loss to South Korea (25–27), finished first in their main-round group thanks to a decisive victory over Russia (20–19). This defeat dropped the Russians, the defending champions, to fourth place in the final standings of their group, whereas a win would have allowed them to take the lead. In the second main-round group, the situation was just as tight, with three teams tied on points. Thanks to their victories in the head-to-head matches among these three teams, Hungary and Ukraine qualified at the expense of Norway. France defeated Ukraine in the semi-finals to reach its second final, while at the same time Hungary eliminated South Korea. In a memorable final, France came back from a seven-goal deficit with eight minutes left in regulation time (18–25) to equalize in the final seconds (28–28) and ultimately win in extra time, 32–29. This victory gave France the first major title in history.

After its failure in 2003, Russia hosted the 2005 World Championship. For the first time, all matches were held in a single city, Saint Petersburg. At home, the Russians—still led masterfully by Yevgeni Trefilov were flawless in the group stages, as were the Romanians, securing their spots in the final four. In the semi-finals, Russia comfortably defeated Denmark, 31–24, and was joined, as expected, by Romania, who beat Hungary. Before 10,500 spectators at Saint Petersburg's Ice Palace, Russia ultimately defeated Romania, 28–23, marking its return to the top of world handball. It was the country's second title.

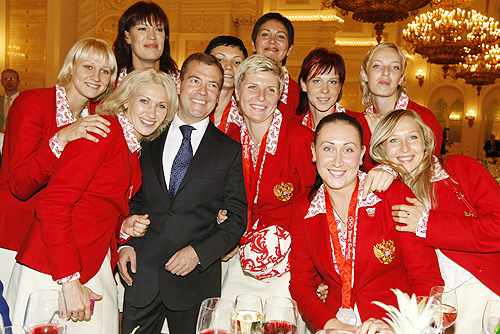
President Dmitry Medvedev with the Russian women's handball team.

The 2007 edition was hosted by France. The rules changed slightly for this tournament. The 24 teams were divided into six groups of four, with the top two advancing to two six-team groups in the main round. The top four teams from each group then qualified for cross quarterfinals. The teams eliminated in the preliminary round played a new classification tournament known as the "President’s Cup." All of the favorites reached the quarterfinals, from which Norway, Germany, Russia, and Romania emerged victorious, with Romania eliminating France, the host nation, 34–31 after two extra-time periods. In a rematch of the previous edition's final, Russia once again got the better of Romania (30–20) and qualified for the final, where it faced Norway, who had defeated Germany (33–30). The Norwegians, who had beaten Russia one year earlier in the final of the 2006 European Championship, were unable to contain their opponents and lost 24–29. Russia thus retained its title won two years earlier, the first such achievement since the 1990 edition. Anna Kareyeva, Irina Poltoratskaya, and Oksana Romenskaya thereby became triple world champions after their victories in 2001, 2005, and 2007.

The tournament headed to East Asia and China for the 2009 edition. The format remained largely the same, with the only changes being the structure of the preliminary groups (six groups of six teams) and the removal of the quarterfinals. France, Russia, Norway, and Spain reached the semi-finals. In a rematch of the previous World Championship final, Russia once again defeated Norway (28–20) to reach another final, while France overcame Spain (27–23). And just as in the previous two editions, Russia demonstrated its dominance by defeating France in the final, 25–22, securing a third consecutive title. It was their fourth title in the last five editions, highlighting the Russian team's dominance throughout the 2000s. Nadezhda Muravyova and Inna Suslina (who both won gold medals in 2001, 2007 and 2009) as well as Lyudmila Postnova and Emiliya Turey (who both won gold medals in 2005, 2007 and 2009) joined that year the ranks of the most decorated women in the competition, with three world titles.

=== 2010–2020: Norway and the Underdogs ===
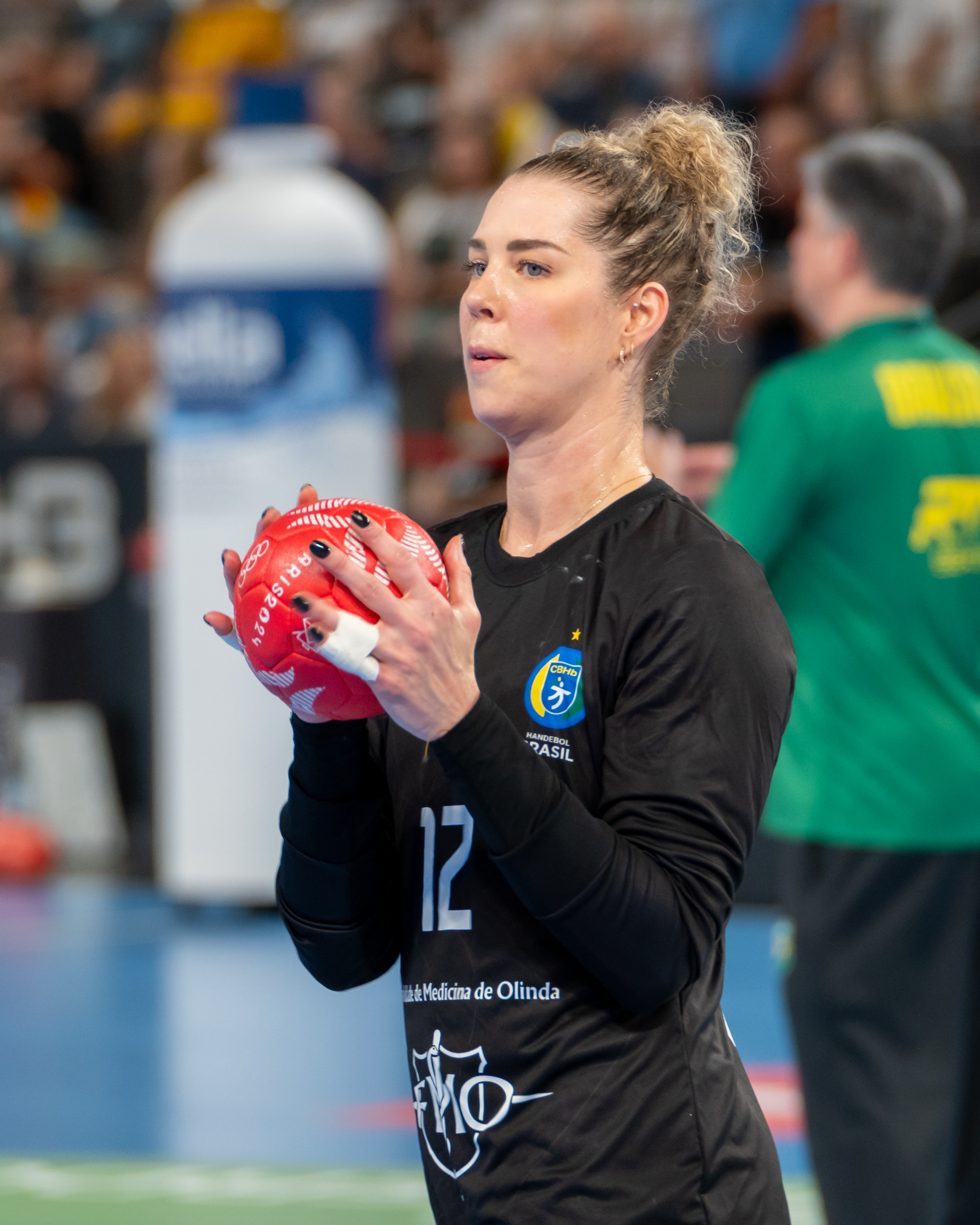
Bárbara Arenhart a Brazilian handball goalkeeper champion from 2013.

The 20th edition of the World Championship was organized by Brazil in 2011. It was the third time, after South Korea in 1990 and China in 2009, that the competition was held outside Europe, and the first time on the American continent. The favorites of the tournament were Russia, the defending champion, France, Denmark, and Norway. The format returned to that used in the World Championships from 1997 to 2001, with four groups of six teams, the top four of each group in the preliminary round qualifying for a knockout stage starting from the round of 16. Among the main nations, only Germany failed to advance past the preliminary round: despite an initial victory over Norway, the German team subsequently lost to Montenegro (this was Montenegro's debut participation), Iceland, and Angola. In the round of 16, Angola caused a surprise by qualifying for the quarterfinals at the expense of South Korea, before falling to Denmark in the quarterfinals. The quarterfinals saw France take revenge on Russia with a 25–23 victory, eliminating the three-time defending champions, who thus failed to achieve an unprecedented quadruple. France reached the final once again by defeating Denmark in the semi-finals (28–23), as did Norway, who eliminated Spain (30–22). In the final, Norway handed France a second consecutive defeat at this stage of the competition with a decisive 32–24 victory. This was the second title for the Norwegian team after their 1999 victory, again over France.

The 2013 tournament took place in Serbia, with the format unchanged. The first surprise occurred during the qualification stages, when Russia was eliminated by the Netherlands in the European playoffs. Russia thus did not participate in the World Championship for the first time. The two finalists from the previous edition, France and Norway, were eliminated in the quarterfinals by Serbia, the host nation, and Poland, respectively. Brazil and Serbia reached the final after victories over Denmark (27–21) and Poland (24–18) in the semi-finals, creating an unexpected and unprecedented final. On this occasion, Brazil, led by goalkeeper Bárbara Arenhart and backcourt player Eduarda Amorim, who was named the tournament's best player, won 22–20, claiming their first World Championship title and the first ever for an American nation. The final, held at the Belgrade Arena, was attended by 19,467 spectators, marking the third time that a world record for the highest attendance at a single World Championship match was broken during this tournament.

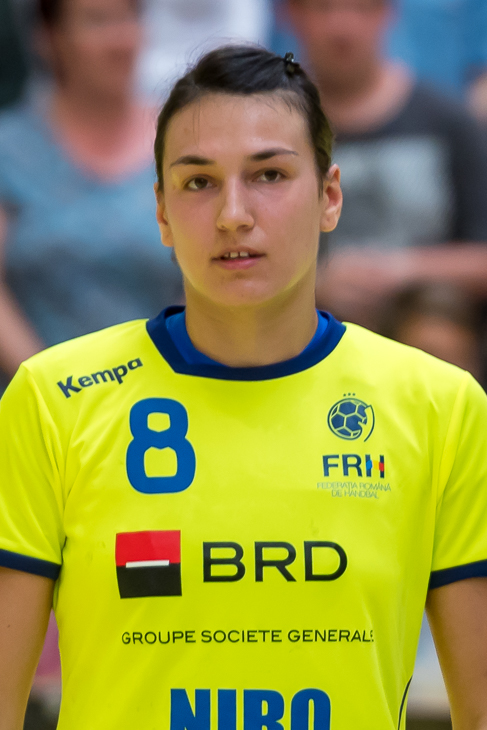
Cristina Neagu best handball player of 2015.

For the 2015 edition, organized in Denmark, the defending champions Brazil, unbeaten in the group stage, failed to progress past the round of 16, being eliminated by Romania. In the following round, Romania defeated the Danish team, who were playing in front of their home crowd (31–30), before losing themselves to Norway (33–35), who returned to the top level after the disappointment of 2013. Norway met the Netherlands, the surprise team of the tournament, in the final; the Dutch had successively eliminated Serbia, France, and Poland to reach their first World Championship final. Norway won the final convincingly, 31–23, becoming world champion for the third time. The bronze medal was claimed by Romania, largely thanks to Cristina Neagu, who finished as top scorer, was named the best player, and was later voted best handball player of 2015.

The 2017 World Championship was held in Germany. The Netherlands confirmed their presence at the top level by reaching the semi-finals, where they were defeated by Norway (23–32). Norway, favorites to defend their title after a controlled tournament in which they had notably beaten Russia comfortably in the quarterfinals (34–17), faced France in the final, who had defeated Sweden in the semi-finals (24–22). However, in a very tight final, France prevented Norway from playing their usual attacking game and won 23–21. This was the French team's second World Championship title, after their 2003 victory, following two final defeats in 2009 and 2011. The Netherlands won the third-place match against Sweden (24–21), and Norway's Stine Bredal Oftedal was named the tournament's best player.

The 2019 World Championship in Japan was won for the first time by the Netherlands, who defeated Spain in the final; this marked Spain's best-ever result at a World Championship. In the bronze medal match, Russia defeated Norway. France, the defending champion, failed to progress past the first round.

=== 2020–present day ===
Due to the COVID-19 pandemic, the 2020 Summer Olympics in Tokyo were postponed to 2021, and as a result, the 2021 World Championship in Spain was held just four months after Olympic tournament. After Olympic success, France was on course to achieve the double but was defeated in the final by Norway, who claimed their fourth world title and therefore tied with Russia as the all-time leader in wins in the World Championships. With only six goals scored in the second half, France became the team with the lowest output in a single half in the final of the IHF Women's World Championship since 1973, when Romania scored only four times against Yugoslavia in their 11:16. Thanks to its victory over the host nation Spain, Denmark won its first medal, bronze, since 2013.

In reaction to the 2022 Russian invasion of Ukraine, the International Handball Federation banned Russian and Belarusian athletes and officials, and the European Handball Federation suspended the national teams of Russia and Belarus, as well as Russian and Belarusian clubs competing in European handball competitions. Referees, officials, and commission members from Russia and Belarus will not be called upon for future activities.

The 2023 World Championship took place in Denmark, Norway, and Sweden. While all three host countries managed to qualify their teams for the semi-finals, it was a fourth nation, France, that won the competition for the third time, following their victories in 2003 and 2017. Norway, defeated 31–28 in the final, took the silver medal, while Denmark confirmed their return to the top by securing the bronze medal with a one-goal victory (28–27) over Sweden.

== Tournaments ==
#	Year	Host	Final			Third place match			Teams
#	Year	Host	Champions	Score	Runners-up	Third place	Score	Fourth place	Teams
1	1957; Details	(Socialist Federal Republic of Yugoslavia); Yugoslavia	Czechoslovakia	7–1	Hungary	Yugoslavia	9–6	West Germany	9
2	1962; Details	Romania	Romania	8–5	Denmark	Czechoslovakia	6–5	Yugoslavia	9
3	1965; Details	West Germany	Hungary	5–3	Yugoslavia	West Germany	11–10	Czechoslovakia	8
-	1968	Soviet Union	The tournament was cancelled due to the Soviet invasion of Czechoslovakia						-
4	1971; Details	Netherlands	East Germany	11–8	Yugoslavia	Hungary	12–11 (2ET)	Romania	9
5	1973; Details	(Socialist Federal Republic of Yugoslavia); Yugoslavia	Yugoslavia	16–11	Romania	Soviet Union	20–12	Hungary	12
6	1975; Details	Soviet Union	East Germany	Round-robin	Soviet Union	Hungary	Round-robin	Romania	12
7	1978; Details	Czechoslovakia	East Germany	Round-robin	Soviet Union	Hungary	Round-robin	Czechoslovakia	12
8	1982; Details	Hungary	Soviet Union	Round-robin	Hungary	Yugoslavia	Round-robin	East Germany	12
9	1986; Details	Netherlands	Soviet Union	30–22	Czechoslovakia	Norway	23–19	East Germany	16
10	1990; Details	South Korea	Soviet Union	24–22	Yugoslavia	East Germany	25–19	West Germany	16
11	1993; Details	Norway	Germany	22–21 (ET)	Denmark	Norway	20–19	Romania	16
12	1995; Details	Austria / Hungary	South Korea	25–20	Hungary	Denmark	25–24	Norway	20
13	1997; Details	Germany	Denmark	33–20	Norway	Germany	27–25	Russia	24
14	1999; Details	Norway / Denmark	Norway	25–24 (2ET)	France	Austria	31–28 (ET)	Romania	24
15	2001; Details	Italy	Russia	30–25	Norway	FR Yugoslavia	42–40 (ET)	Denmark	24
16	2003; Details	Croatia	France	32–29 (ET)	Hungary	South Korea	31–29	Ukraine	24
17	2005; Details	Russia	Russia	28–23	Romania	Hungary	27–24	Denmark	24
18	2007; Details	France	Russia	29–24	Norway	Germany	36–35 (ET)	Romania	24
19	2009; Details	China	Russia	25–22	France	Norway	31–26	Spain	24
20	2011; Details	Brazil	Norway	32–24	France	Spain	24–18	Denmark	24
21	2013; Details	Serbia	Brazil	22–20	Serbia	Denmark	30–26	Poland	24
22	2015; Details	Denmark	Norway	31–23	Netherlands	Romania	31–22	Poland	24
23	2017; Details	Germany	France	23–21	Norway	Netherlands	24–21	Sweden	24
24	2019; Details	Japan	Netherlands	30–29	Spain	Russia	33–28	Norway	24
25	2021; Details	Spain	Norway	29–22	France	Denmark	35–28	Spain	32
26	2023; Details	Denmark / Norway / Sweden	France	31–28	Norway	Denmark	28–27	Sweden	32
27	2025; Details	Netherlands / Germany	Norway	23–20	Germany	France	33–31 (ET)	Netherlands	32
28	2027; Details	Hungary							32
29	2029; Details	Spain							32
30	2031; Details	Czech Republic / Poland							32

== Medal table ==
In most of its reports, the IHF lists medal winners according to the countries that inherited the achievements of former republics. In some texts, the IHF does distinguish between different periods, but it never explicitly states that those medals do not belong to the countries that inherited them.

Rank	Nation	Gold	Silver	Bronze	Total
1	Russia	4	0	1	5
1	Soviet Union	3	2	1	6
1	Total:	7	2	2	11
2	Norway	5	5	3	13
3	Germany	1	1	2	4
3	East Germany	3	0	1	4
3	West Germany	0	0	1	1
3	Total:	4	1	4	9
4	France	3	4	1	8
5	Hungary	1	4	4	9
6	Serbia	0	1	0	1
6	Yugoslavia	1	3	2	6
6	Serbia and Montenegro	0	0	1	1
6	Total:	1	4	3	8
7	Denmark	1	2	4	7
8	Romania	1	2	1	4
9	Czech Republic	0	0	0	0
9	Czechoslovakia	1	1	1	3
9	Total:	1	1	1	3
9	Netherlands	1	1	1	3
10	South Korea	1	0	1	2
11	Brazil	1	0	0	1
12	Spain	0	1	1	2
13	Austria	0	0	1	1
Totals (19 nations)		27	27	27	81

== Participating nations ==
Source: IHF official site.

Legend

- 1st – Champions
- 2nd – Runners-up
- 3rd – Third place
- 4th – Fourth place
- 5th – Fifth place
- 6th – Sixth place
- 7th – Seventh place
- 8th – Eighth place
- 9th – Ninth place
- 10th – Tenth place
- 11th – Eleventh place
- 12th – Twelfth place
- MR – Main round
- GS – Group stage
- Q – Qualified for upcoming tournament
- •• – Qualified but withdrew
- • – Did not qualify
- × – Did not enter / Withdrew from the World Championship / Banned
- – Hosts

For each tournament, the number of teams in each finals tournament (in brackets) are shown.

Team	(Socialist Federal Republic of Yugoslavia); 1957	(Romania); 1962	(West Germany); 1965	(Netherlands); 1971	(Socialist Federal Republic of Yugoslavia); 1973	(Soviet Union); 1975	(Czechoslovakia); 1978	(Hungary); 1982	(Netherlands); 1986	(South Korea); 1990	(Norway); 1993	(Austria) (Hungary); 1995	(Germany); 1997	(Denmark) (Norway); 1999	(Italy); 2001	(Croatia); 2003	(Russia); 2005	(France); 2007	(China); 2009	(Brazil); 2011	(Serbia); 2013	(Denmark); 2015	(Germany); 2017	(Japan); 2019	(Spain); 2021	(Denmark) (Norway) (Sweden); 2023	(Germany) (Netherlands); 2025	(Hungary); 2027	(Spain); 2029	(Czech Republic) (Poland); 2031	Total
Algeria	France		×	×	×	×	10th	•	•	•	•	•	19th	×	•	•	×	×	•	•	22nd	•	•	•	×	•	•				3
Angola	Part of Portugal					×	×	•	•	16th	16th	13th	15th	15th	13th	17th	16th	7th	11th	8th	16th	16th	19th	15th	25th	15th	10th				18
Argentina	×	×	×	×	×	•	•	•	•	•	•	•	•	24th	•	22nd	20th	20th	19th	23rd	19th	18th	23rd	16th	21st	20th	22nd				13
Australia	×	×	×	×	×	•	•	•	•	•	•	•	•	23rd	•	23rd	24th	24th	24th	24th	24th	•	×	24th	×	•	×				8
Austria	6th	×	×	×	•	•	•	•	12th	5th	8th	8th	11th	3rd	7th	11th	13th	16th	10th	•	•	•	•	•	16th	19th	16th				15
Belarus	Part of Soviet Union										•	•	16th	14th	•	•	•	•	•	•	•	•	•	•	•	×	×				2
Brazil	×	×	×	×	×	•	•	•	•	•	•	17th	23rd	16th	12th	20th	7th	14th	15th	5th	1st	10th	18th	17th	6th	9th	6th				16
Bulgaria	×	×	×	•	•	•	•	10th	•	12th	•	•	•	•	•	•	•	•	•	•	•	•	•	•	×	•	•				2
Cameroon	FRA	×	×	×	×	×	•	×	•	•	×	×	•	•	•	•	22nd	•	•	•	•	•	20th	•	28th	24th	•				4
Canada	×	×	×	×	×	•	10th	•	•	15th	•	17th	20th	•	•	•	•	•	•	•	•	•	•	•	×	•	•				4
Chile	×	×	×	×	×	•	•	•	•	•	•	•	•	•	•	•	•	•	23rd	•	•	•	•	•	•	27th	•				2
China	×	×	×	×	×	×	×	•	9th	8th	14th	13th	22nd	18th	11th	19th	17th	21st	12th	21st	18th	17th	22nd	23rd	32nd	28th	26th				19
Congo	FRA	×	×	×	×	×	×	12th	••	•	•	•	•	22nd	22nd	•	•	17th	20th	•	•	•	•	•	23rd	26th	•				7
Croatia	Part of Yugoslavia										•	10th	6th	•	•	14th	11th	9th	•	7th	•	•	•	•	18th	14th	25th				9
Cuba	×	×	×	×	×	•	•	•	•	•	•	•	•	21st	•	•	•	•	•	22nd	•	23rd	•	21st	×	•	30th				5
Czech Republic	See Czechoslovakia											13th	13th	19th	•	15th	•	•	•	•	15th	•	8th	•	19th	8th	18th			Q	10
DR Congo	BEL	×	×	×	×	×	×	×	×	×	•	×	×	×	×	•	•	•	•	•	20th	24th	•	20th	•	•	•				3
Denmark	5th	2nd	5th	6th	7th	9th	•	•	•	10th	2nd	3rd	1st	6th	4th	13th	4th	•	5th	4th	3rd	6th	6th	9th	3rd	3rd	5th				23
Dominican Republic	×	×	×	×	×	•	•	•	•	•	•	•	•	•	•	•	•	22nd	•	•	23rd	•	•	•	×	×	×				2
Egypt	×	×	×	×	×	•	•	•	•	•	×	×	×	×	×	×	•	×	×	•	•	×	×	×	×	•	28th				1
Faroe Islands	×	×	×	×	×	×	×	×	×	×	×	×	×	×	•	×	×	×	×	×	×	×	•	•	•	•	17th				1
France	×	×	×	×	×	•	•	•	15th	14th	•	•	10th	2nd	5th	1st	12th	5th	2nd	2nd	6th	7th	1st	13th	2nd	1st	3rd				17
Germany (including West Germany)	4th	8th	3rd	5th	11th	•	8th	9th	7th	4th	1st	5th	3rd	7th	•	12th	6th	3rd	7th	17th	7th	13th	12th	8th	7th	6th	2nd				25
Greenland	×	×	×	×	×	•	•	•	•	•	•	•	•	•	24th	•	•	•	•	•	•	•	•	•	•	32nd	×				2
Hungary	2nd	5th	1st	3rd	4th	3rd	3rd	2nd	8th	•	7th	2nd	9th	5th	6th	2nd	3rd	8th	9th	•	8th	11th	15th	14th	10th	10th	7th	Q			26
Iceland	×	×	×	×	×	×	×	×	•	•	•	•	•	•	•	•	•	•	•	12th	•	•	•	•	•	25th	21st				3
Iran	×	×	×	×	×	•	×	×	•	×	•	×	×	×	•	×	×	×	×	•	•	•	•	•	31st	31st	32nd				3
Italy	×	×	×	×	×	•	•	•	•	•	•	•	•	•	16th	•	•	•	•	•	•	•	•	•	•	•	•				1
Ivory Coast	×	×	×	×	×	×	•	•	•	•	•	17th	14th	20th	•	21st	21st	•	18th	16th	•	×	•	•	×	•	×				7
Japan	×	9th	7th	9th	10th	10th	•	•	14th	•	•	13th	17th	17th	20th	16th	18th	19th	16th	14th	14th	19th	16th	10th	11th	17th	13th				22
Kazakhstan	Part of Soviet Union										•	×	×	×	•	••	×	18th	22nd	19th	•	22nd	•	22nd	24th	30th	31st				8
Lithuania	Part of Soviet Union										13th	•	•	•	•	•	•	•	•	•	•	•	•	•	•	×	×				1
Montenegro	Part of Yugoslavia										Part of Serbia and Montenegro							•	•	10th	11th	8th	6th	5th	22nd	7th	8th				8
Netherlands	×	×	•	8th	12th	•	9th	•	10th	•	•	•	•	10th	14th	•	5th	•	•	15th	13th	2nd	3rd	1st	9th	5th	4th				15
North Macedonia	Part of Yugoslavia										•	•	7th	8th	21st	•	15th	12th	•	•	•	•	•	•	•	•	•				5
Norway	×	×	•	7th	8th	8th	•	7th	3rd	6th	3rd	4th	2nd	1st	2nd	6th	9th	2nd	3rd	1st	5th	1st	2nd	4th	1st	2nd	1st				23
Paraguay	×	×	×	×	×	•	•	•	•	•	•	•	•	•	•	•	•	23rd	•	•	21st	•	21st	•	29th	29th	27th				6
Poland	7th	7th	8th	•	5th	7th	6th	•	13th	9th	10th	•	8th	11th	•	•	19th	11th	•	•	4th	4th	17th	•	15th	16th	11th			Q	20
Puerto Rico	×	×	×	×	×	•	•	•	•	•	•	•	•	•	•	•	•	•	•	•	•	20th	•	•	20th	×	•				2
Romania	9th	1st	6th	4th	2nd	4th	7th	8th	5th	7th	4th	7th	12th	4th	17th	10th	2nd	4th	8th	13th	10th	3rd	10th	12th	13th	12th	9th				27
Russia	See Soviet Union										5th	6th	4th	12th	1st	7th	1st	1st	1st	6th	•	5th	5th	3rd	8th	×	×				14
Senegal	FRA	×	×	×	×	•	×	×	•	×	•	×	×	×	•	×	×	×	×	•	•	•	•	18th	•	18th	24th				3
Serbia	Part of Yugoslavia										See Serbia and Montenegro							•	•	•	2nd	15th	9th	6th	12th	21st	12th				7
Slovakia	Part of Czechoslovakia											12th	•	•	•	•	•	•	•	•	•	•	•	•	26th	•	•				2
Slovenia	Part of Yugoslavia										•	•	18th	•	9th	8th	14th	•	•	•	•	•	14th	19th	17th	11th	•				8
South Korea	×	×	×	×	×	•	10th	6th	11th	11th	11th	1st	5th	9th	15th	3rd	8th	6th	6th	11th	12th	14th	13th	11th	14th	22nd	23rd				21
Spain	×	×	×	×	×	•	•	•	•	•	15th	•	•	•	10th	5th	•	10th	4th	3rd	9th	12th	11th	2nd	4th	13th	14th		Q		14
Sweden	8th	×	•	•	•	•	•	•	•	13th	6th	11th	•	•	8th	•	•	•	13th	9th	•	9th	4th	7th	5th	4th	15th				13
Switzerland	×	×	×	×	×	×	•	•	•	•	•	•	•	×	×	•	•	•	•	•	•	•	•	•	•	•	19th				1
Thailand	×	×	×	×	×	×	×	×	×	×	×	×	×	×	×	×	×	×	21st	•	×	×	×	×	×	•	×				1
Tunisia	×	×	×	×	×	12th	•	•	•	•	•	•	×	×	19th	18th	•	15th	14th	18th	17th	21st	24th	•	27th	•	20th				11
Ukraine	Part of Soviet Union										•	9th	•	13th	18th	4th	10th	13th	17th	•	•	•	•	•	•	23rd	•				8
United States	×	×	×	×	×	11th	•	11th	16th	•	12th	17th	•	•	•	•	•	•	•	•	•	•	•	•	•	•					5
Uruguay	×	×	×	×	×	•	•	•	•	•	•	•	24th	•	23rd	24th	23rd	•	•	20th	•	•	•	•	•	•	29th				6
Uzbekistan	Part of Soviet Union										×	×	21st	×	×	•	×	×	•	•	•	•	•	×	30th	•	×				2
Discontinued teams
Czechoslovakia	1st	3rd	4th	•	6th	6th	4th	5th	2nd	•	9th	See Czech Republic																			9
East Germany	×	•	•	1st	9th	1st	1st	4th	4th	3rd	See Germany																				7
Serbia and Montenegro	Part of Yugoslavia										•	•	•	•	3rd	9th	•	See Serbia													2
Soviet Union	×	6th	×	•	3rd	2nd	2nd	1st	1st	1st	See Russia																				7
Yugoslavia	3rd	4th	2nd	2nd	1st	5th	5th	3rd	6th	2nd	See Serbia																				10
Total	9	9	8	9	12	12	12	12	16	16	16	20	24	24	24	24	24	24	24	24	24	24	24	24	32	32	32	32	32	32	

Since first entering the tournament in 1957, Romania are the only team to have appeared in all 27 tournaments to date.

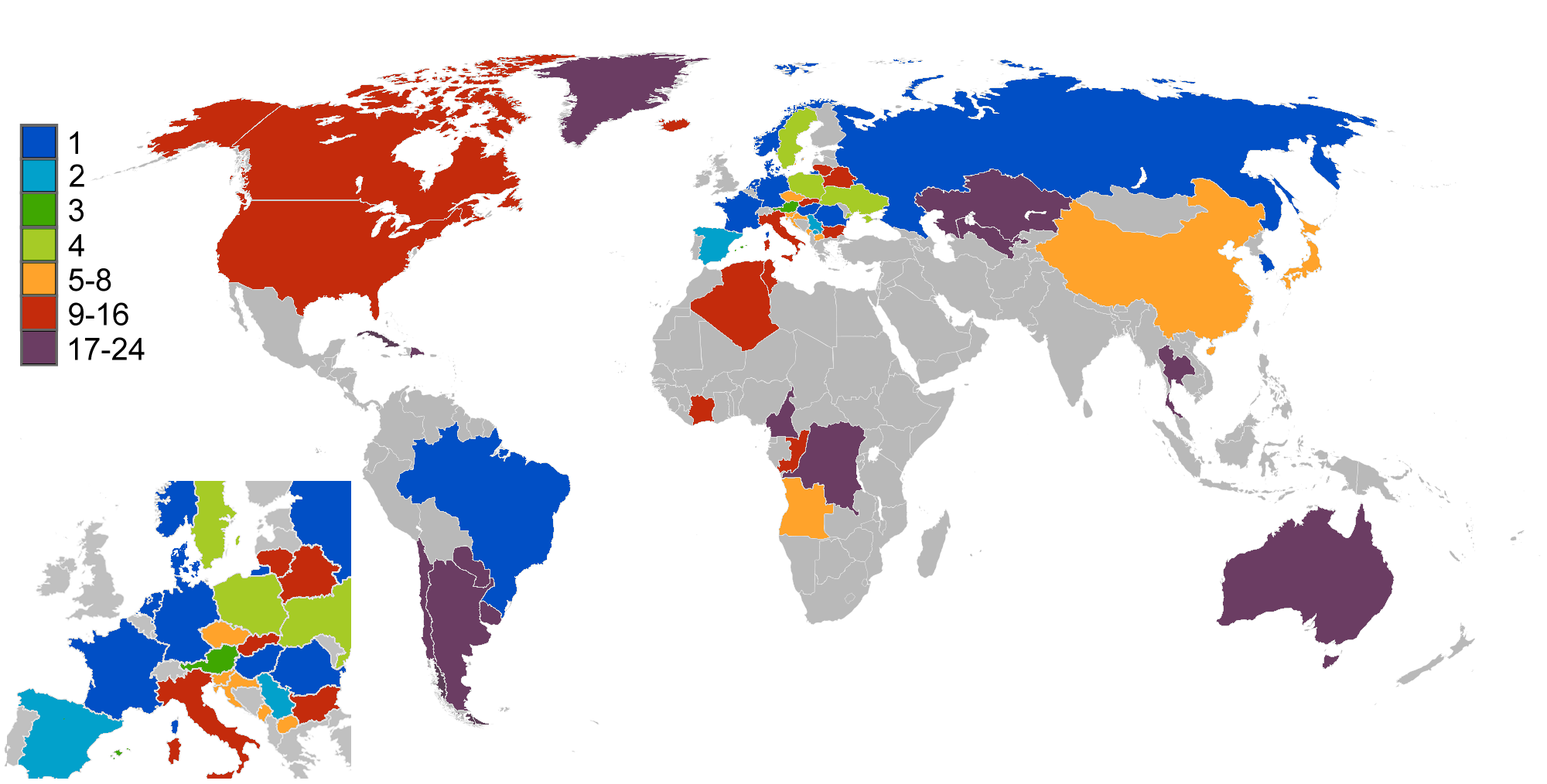
Best result of participants (as of 2019).

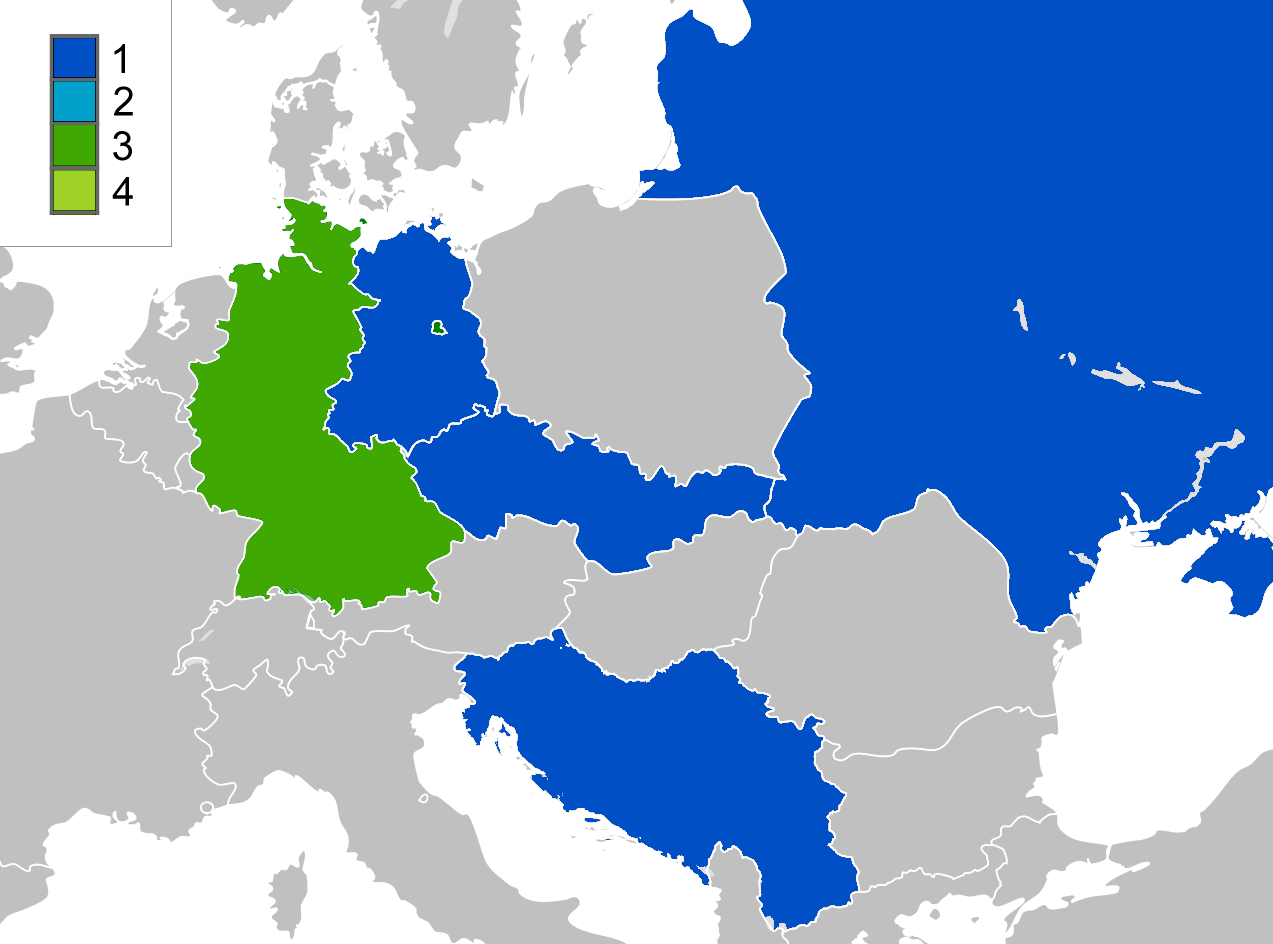
Best result for discontinued states

== Most successful players ==
Boldface denotes active handball players and highest medal count among all players (including these who not included in these tables) per type.

=== Multiple gold medalists ===
The table shows players who have won at least 3 gold medals at the World Championships.

Rank	Player	Country	From	To	Gold	Silver	Bronze	Total
1	**Katrine Lunde (Haraldsen)**	Norway	2007	2025	**3**	**3**	1	**7**
2	**Camilla Herrem**	Norway	2009	2023	**3**	2	1	6
3	**Vilde Ingstad**	Norway	2015	2025	**3**	2	–	5
3	**Nora Mørk**	Norway	2015	2025	**3**	2	–	5
3	Stine Bredal Oftedal	Norway	2011	2023	**3**	2	–	5
6	**Veronica Kristiansen**	Norway	2015	2025	**3**	1	–	4
7	Maryna Bazanova	Soviet Union	1982	1990	**3**	–	–	3
7	Hannelore Burosch	East Germany	1971	1978	**3**	–	–	3
7	Maria Constantinescu (Scheip)	Romania	1956	1962	3 **	–	–	3 **
7	Victorița Dumitrescu	Romania	1956	1962	3 **	–	–	3 **
7	Anna Kareyeva	Russia	2001	2007	**3**	–	–	3
7	Irina Klimovschi (Nagy)	Romania	1956	1962	3 **	–	–	3 **
7	Waltraud Kretzschmar	East Germany	1971	1978	**3**	–	–	3
7	Nadezhda Muravyova	Russia	2001	2009	**3**	–	–	3
7	Irina Poltoratskaya	Russia	2001	2007	**3**	–	–	3
7	Lyudmila Postnova	Russia	2005	2009	**3**	–	–	3
7	Kristina Richter (Hochmuth)	East Germany	1971	1978	**3**	–	–	3
7	Oksana Romenskaya	Russia	2001	2007	**3**	–	–	3
7	Ana Stănișel (Starck)	Romania	1956	1962	3 **	–	–	3 **
7	Iozefina Ștefănescu (Ugron)	Romania	1956	1962	3 **	–	–	3 **
7	Inna Suslina	Russia	2001	2009	**3**	–	–	3
7	Aurelia Szőke (Sălăgeanu)	Romania	1956	1962	3 **	–	–	3 **
7	Emiliya Turey	Russia	2005	2009	**3**	–	–	3
7	Petra Uhlig (Kahnt)	East Germany	1971	1978	**3**	–	–	3
7	Hannelore Zober	East Germany	1971	1978	**3**	–	–	3

** including two medals won at the 1956 and 1960 World Outdoor Field Handball Championships

=== Multiple medalists ===
The table shows players who have won at least 4 medals in total at the World Championships.

Rank	Player	Country	From	To	Gold	Silver	Bronze	Total
1	**Katrine Lunde (Haraldsen)**	Norway	2007	2025	**3**	**3**	1	**7**
2	**Camilla Herrem**	Norway	2009	2023	**3**	2	1	6
3	**Vilde Ingstad**	Norway	2015	2025	**3**	2	–	5
3	**Nora Mørk**	Norway	2015	2025	**3**	2	–	5
3	Stine Bredal Oftedal	Norway	2011	2023	**3**	2	–	5
6	Kari Aalvik Grimsbø	Norway	2007	2017	2	2	1	5
6	Zinaida Turchyna	Soviet Union	1973	1986	2	2	1	5
8	**Veronica Kristiansen**	Norway	2015	2025	**3**	1	–	4
9	**Stine Skogrand**	Norway	2015	2025	2	2	–	4
9	**Sanna Solberg-Isaksen**	Norway	2015	2023	2	2	–	4
9	**Silje Solberg-Østhassel**	Norway	2015	2023	2	2	–	4
12	**Orlane Kanor**	France	2017	2025	2	1	1	4
12	Heidi Løke	Norway	2009	2017	2	1	1	4
14	Cléopatre Darleux	France	2009	2021	1	**3**	–	4
14	Allison Pineau	France	2009	2021	1	**3**	–	4
16	Amália Sterbinszky	Hungary	1971	1982	–	1	**3**	4

== Top scorers and best players by tournament ==
The record-holder for scored goals in a single World Championship is Bojana Radulović. She scored 97 goals for Hungary at the 2003 World Championship.

Year	Top scorer	Goals	Best player
1957	(Czech Republic) Pavla Bartáková	11	
1962	(Czech Republic) Marie Mateju (Romania) Ana Stănișel	14	
1965	(Denmark) Anne-Marie Nielsen	11	
1971	(Japan) Hideyo Taramizu	22	
1973	(East Germany) Christine Gehlhoff	25	
1975	(Soviet Union) Tetyana Makarets	35	
1978	(Czech Republic) Milena Foltýnová (East Germany) Kristina Richter	41	
1982	(Socialist Federal Republic of Yugoslavia) Jasna Merdan	52	(Soviet Union) Larisa Karlova
1986	(Soviet Union) Natalya Kirchik	61	(Soviet Union) Natalya Kirchik
1990	(Poland) Bożena Karkut (Soviet Union) Svetlana Vydrina	50	
1993	(South Korea) Hong Jeong-ho	58	
1995	(Ukraine) Nataliya Derepasko	61	
1997	(North Macedonia) Indira Kastratović	71	(Germany) Franziska Heinz
1999	(Romania) Carmen Amariei (Germany) Grit Jurack	67	(Austria) Ausra Fridrikas
2001	(Austria) Ausra Fridrikas	87	(Austria) Ausra Fridrikas
2003	(Hungary) Bojana Radulović	97	(France) Valérie Nicolas
2005	(Germany) Nadine Krause (Austria) Tanja Logwin	60	(Russia) Lyudmila Bodniyeva
2007	(Germany) Grit Jurack	85	(Norway) Katja Nyberg
2009	(Austria) Katrin Engel	67	(Russia) Lyudmila Postnova
2011	(Brazil) Alexandra do Nascimento	57	Not awarded
2013	(Germany) Susann Müller	62	(Brazil) Eduarda Amorim
2015	(Romania) Cristina Neagu	63	(Romania) Cristina Neagu
2017	(Norway) Nora Mørk	66	(Norway) Stine Bredal Oftedal
2019	(Netherlands) Lois Abbingh	71	(Netherlands) Estavana Polman
2021	(Sweden) Nathalie Hagman	71	(Norway) Kari Brattset Dale
2023	(Czech Republic) Markéta Jeřábková	63	(Norway) Henny Reistad
2025	(Norway) Henny Reistad	55	(Norway) Henny Reistad

== Largest winning margin ==
Margin	Winning team	Score	Opponent	WC
48	Hungary	57–9	Australia	2005
46	Netherlands	61–15	Kazakhstan	2021
45	Sweden	66–21	Australia	2009
41	Netherlands	58–17	Uzbekistan	2021
41	Angola	52–11	Uzbekistan	2021
41	Austria	52–11	Thailand	2009
40	Netherlands	55–15	Puerto Rico	2021
40	Russia	48–8	Australia	2009
39	Angola	47–8	Australia	2005
39	France	46–7	Australia	2019
38	Netherlands	53–15	Australia	2011
38	South Korea	50–12	Paraguay	2007
38	Sweden	48–10	Puerto Rico	2021
38	Yugoslavia	41–3	Tunisia	1975
37	Norway	48–11	Uruguay	2001
37	Norway	47–10	Australia	2005
37	Russia	45–8	Australia	2011
37	Russia	45–8	Thailand	2009
37	Denmark	42–5	Argentina	1999
36	Norway	43–7	Puerto Rico	2021

Source: TV2Sporten.no

== See also ==
- World Men's Handball Championship
