= Romania women's national handball team =

National team

Romania

Information
- Association: Romanian Handball Federation
- Coach: Ovidiu Mihăilă
- Assistant coach: Iulia Curea
- Most caps: Mariana Tîrcă (335)
- Most goals: Mariana Tîrcă (2043)

Colours
1st	2nd

Results

Summer Olympics
- Appearances: 4 (First in 1976)
- Best result: 4th (1976)

World Championship
- Appearances: 27 (First in 1957)
- Best result: 1st (1962)

European Championship
- Appearances: 15 (First in 1994)
- Best result: 3rd (2010)
- Last updated on Unknown.

Romania women's national handball team
Medal record

World Championship
Gold medal – first place	1962 Romania	
Silver medal – second place	1973 Yugoslavia	
Silver medal – second place	2005 Russia	
Bronze medal – third place	2015 Denmark	

European Championship
Bronze medal – third place	2010 Denmark/Norway	

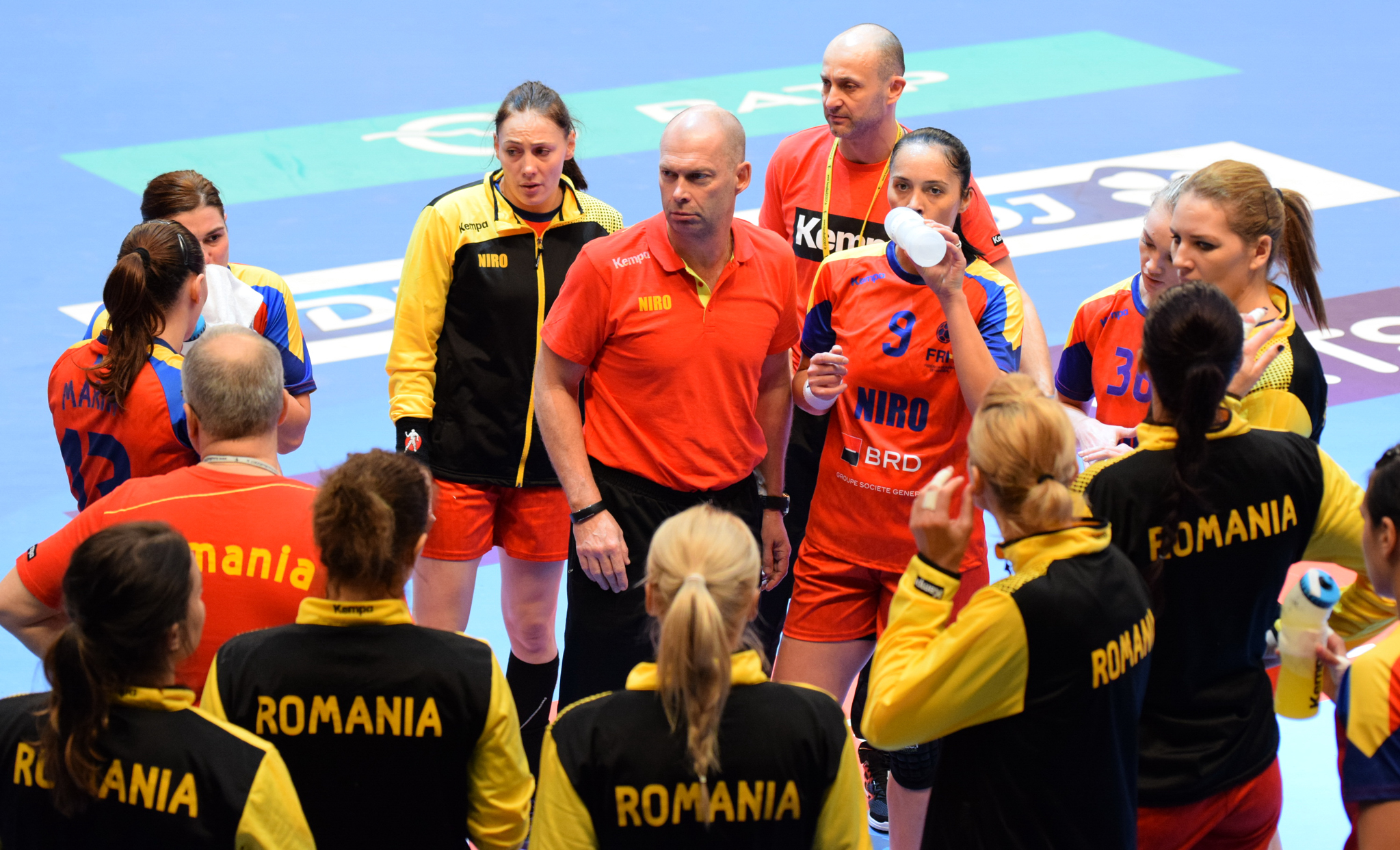
The team in 2015, under Tomas Ryde

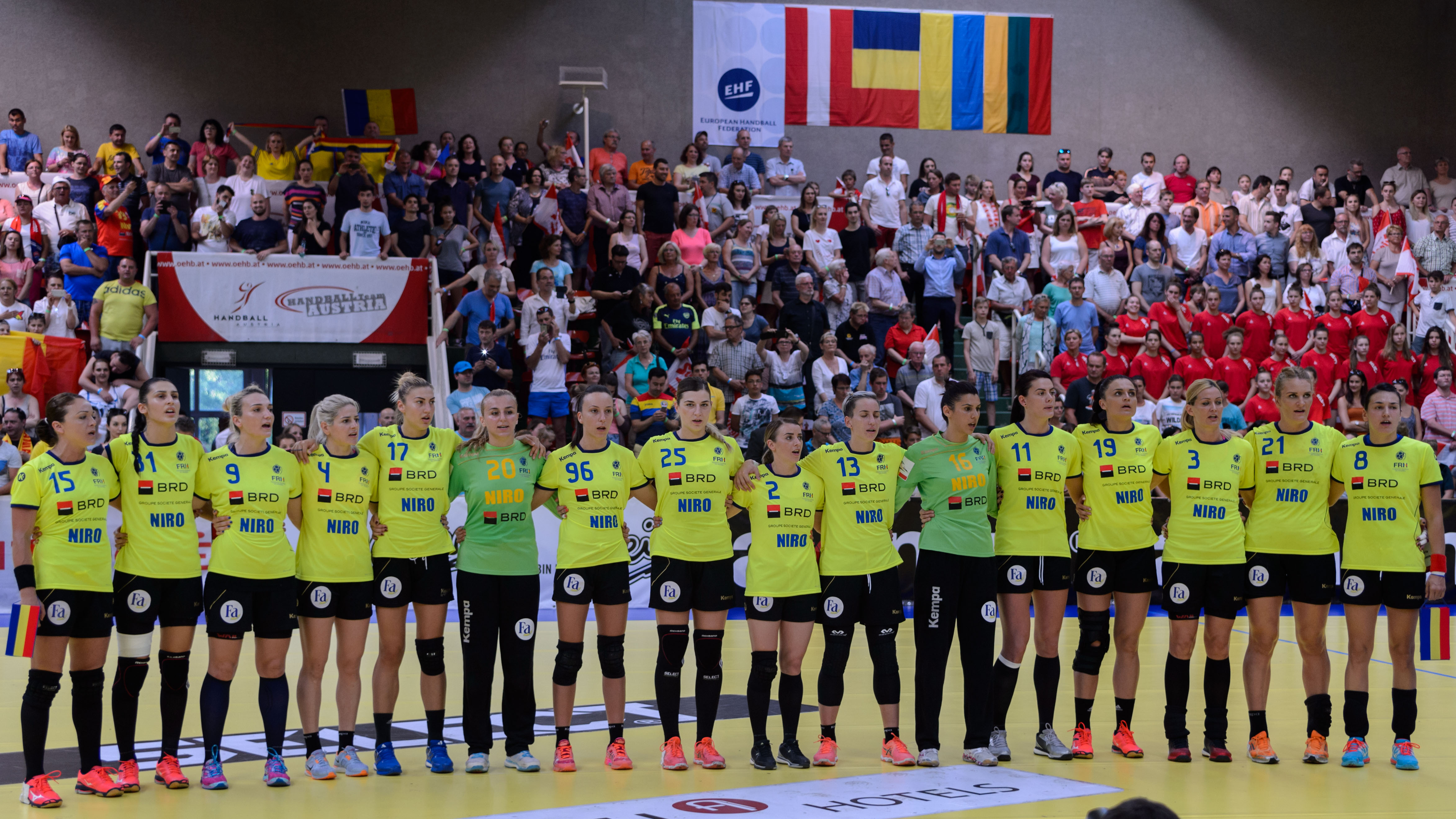
The team in 2017, under Ambros Martín

The Romanian women's national team represents Romania in senior women's international handball and is controlled by the Romanian Handball Federation, the governing body for handball in Romania. It competes in the three major international tournaments; the Olympic Games, the IHF World Championship and the EHF European Championship.

Since first entering World Championship, Romania are the only team to have appeared in all 25 tournaments to date.

They were crowned winners in the IHF World Championship three times: 1956, 1960 and 1962, and finished as runners-up in 1973 and 2005 and also finished third in 2015. Since first entering in 1994, Romania have never won the EHF European Championship, with their best performances being a third-place finish in 2010.

== Honors ==
IHF World Championship

- Gold medalists:1962
- Silver medalists: 1973, 2005
- Bronze medalists: 2015

EHF European Championship

- Bronze medalists: 2010

=== Other awards ===
GF World Cup

- Gold medalists: 2009, 2010
- Silver medalists: 2006

== Competitions ==
Competition	1st place, gold medalist(s)	2nd place, silver medalist(s)	3rd place, bronze medalist(s)	Total
Olympic Games	0	0	0	0
World Championship	1	2	1	4
European Championship	0	0	1	1
Total	1	2	2	5

=== Olympic Games ===
Year	Pos.	Pld	W	D	L
(Canada) 1976	4th	5	2	0	3
(Soviet Union) 1980	did not qualify				
(United States) 1984	did not qualify				
(South Korea) 1988	did not qualify				
(Spain) 1992	did not qualify				
(United States) 1996	did not qualify				
(Australia) 2000	7th	6	2	1	3
(Greece) 2004	did not qualify				
(China) 2008	7th	8	5	0	3
(United Kingdom) 2012	did not qualify				
(Brazil) 2016	9th	5	2	0	3
(Japan) 2020	did not qualify				
(France) 2024	did not qualify				
Total	4/12	24	11	1	12

=== World Championship ===
Since their first appearance in 1957, Romania has participated in 25 World Championships. They were crowned world champions for the first time in 1962 after beating Denmark (8–5) in the final.

Year	Position	Pld	W	D	L	GS	GA	GD
(Socialist Federal Republic of Yugoslavia) 1957	9th	2	0	0	2	2	9	-7
(Romania) 1962	1st	5	4	1	0	41	17	+24
(West Germany) 1965	6th	3	0	2	1	18	21	-3
(Netherlands) 1971	4th	5	2	1	2	51	51	0
(Socialist Federal Republic of Yugoslavia) 1973	2nd	5	4	0	1	67	52	+15
(Soviet Union) 1975	4th	7	4	0	3	102	83	+19
(Czechoslovakia) 1978	7th	5	3	0	2	78	67	+11
(Hungary) 1982	8th	7	3	3	1	159	122	+37
(Netherlands) 1986	5th	7	5	1	1	151	129	+22
(South Korea) 1990	7th	5	1	1	3	90	100	-10
(Norway) 1993	4th	7	4	0	3	156	129	+27
(Austria) (Hungary) 1995	7th	8	6	0	2	232	175	+57
(Germany) 1997	12th	6	3	0	3	186	161	+25
(Denmark) (Norway) 1999	4th	9	5	0	4	250	196	+54
(Italy) 2001	17th	5	1	0	4	129	135	-6
(Croatia) 2003	10th	8	4	1	3	244	206	+38
(Russia) 2005	2nd	10	9	0	1	322	249	+73
(France) 2007	4th	10	7	0	3	323	284	+39
(China) 2009	8th	9	5	1	3	306	231	+75
(Brazil) 2011	13th	6	2	1	3	166	183	-17
(Serbia) 2013	10th	6	4	0	2	161	127	+34
(Denmark) 2015	3rd	9	5	0	4	270	225	+45
(Germany) 2017	10th	6	4	0	2	150	140	+10
(Japan) 2019	12th	8	3	0	5	181	227	-46
(Spain) 2021	13th	6	3	0	3	202	146	+56
(Denmark) (Norway) (Sweden) 2023	12th	6	4	0	2	185	164	+21
(Germany) (Netherlands) 2025	9th	6	4	0	2	197	165	+32
(Hungary) 2027	TBD							
(Spain) 2029	TBD							
(Czech Republic) (Poland) 2031	TBD							
Total	27/30	176	99	12	65	4419	3794	+625

Record against other teams at the world championship

=== European Championship ===
Year	Pos.	Pld	W	D	L	GS	GA	GD
(Germany) 1994	10th	6	2	0	4	112	124	-12
(Denmark) 1996	5th	6	4	1	1	155	139	+16
(Netherlands) 1998	11th	6	1	0	5	148	168	-20
(Romania) 2000	4th	7	3	1	3	168	164	+4
(Denmark) 2002	7th	7	4	0	3	169	166	+3
(Hungary) 2004	7th	7	5	0	2	206	187	+19
(Sweden) 2006	did not qualify							
(North Macedonia) 2008	5th	7	5	0	2	209	199	+10
(Denmark) (Norway) 2010	3rd (bronze)	8	5	0	3	205	197	+8
(Serbia) 2012	10th	6	2	1	3	136	139	-3
(Croatia) (Hungary) 2014	9th	6	3	1	2	136	137	-1
(Sweden) 2016	5th	7	5	0	2	173	158	+15
(France) 2018	4th	8	4	0	4	213	212	+1
(Denmark) (Norway) 2020	12th	6	1	0	5	135	160	-25
(Slovenia) (North Macedonia) (Montenegro) 2022	12th	6	3	0	3	184	181	-11
(Austria) (Hungary) (Switzerland) 2024	11th	7	2	0	5	184	199	-15
(Czech Republic) (Poland) (Romania) (Slovakia) (Turkey) 2026	Qualified as co-host							
(Denmark) (Norway) (Sweden) 2028	TBD							
(Belgium) (France) 2030	TBD							
(Denmark) (Germany) (Poland) 2032	TBD							
Total	15/20	93	46	4	43	2335	2331	+4

Record against other teams at the European Championship

=== GF World Cup ===
- GF World Cup '05 – 4th
- GF World Cup '06 – 2nd
- GF World Cup '07 – 5th
- GF World Cup '08 – 8th
- GF World Cup '09 – Winner
- GF World Cup '10 – Winner

== Team ==
=== Current squad ===
The squad for the 2026 European Women's Handball Championship.

Head coach: Ovidiu Mihai Mihaila

No.	Pos.	Name	Date of birth (age)	Height	App.	Goals	Club
1	GK	Bianca Curmenț	12 June 1997 (age 29)	1.82 m	23	1	(Romania) HC Dunărea Brăila
2	RW	Mihaela Mihai	15 December 2004 (age 21)	1.77 m	20	34	(Romania) HC Dunărea Brăila
3	P	Yaroslava Burlachenko	14 May 1992 (age 34)	1.78 m	6	3	(Romania) Gloria Bistrița
7	LW	Mariam Mohamed	27 August 2004 (age 22)	1.73 m	2	2	(Romania) HC Dunărea Brăila
12	GK	Diana Ciucă	1 June 2000 (age 26)	1.80 m	30	1	(Romania) CS Rapid București
13	CB	Cristina Laslo	10 April 1996 (age 30)	1.77 m	93	164	(Romania) HC Dunărea Brăila
14	LB	Bianca Bazaliu	30 July 1997 (age 29)	1.82 m	87	45	(Romania) CSM Corona Brașov
17	CB	Rebeca Necula	17 May 2003 (age 23)	1.67 m	20	21	(Romania) HC Dunărea Brăila
22	RW	Beatrice Raicea	13 March 2005 (age 21)	1.65 m	2	4	(Romania) HC Dunărea Brăila
24	CB	Alisia Boicuic	20 July 2005 (age 21)	1.77 m	19	40	(Romania) HC Dunărea Brăila
27	P	Lorena Ostase	25 July 1997 (age 29)	1.79 m	65	206	(Romania) Gloria Bistrița
28	LB	Diana Lixăndroiu	14 August 2005 (age 21)	1.84 m	13	12	(Romania) HC Dunărea Brăila
42	CB	Elena Roșu	24 March 1997 (age 29)	1.75 m	21	46	(Romania) HC Dunărea Brăila
44	LW	Éva Kerekes	7 April 2001 (age 25)	1.77 m	11	12	(Romania) CSM Corona Brașov
53	GK	Iulia Dumanska	15 August 1996 (age 30)	1.76 m	79	0	(Romania) CSM București
70	CB	Andreea Popa	3 June 2000 (age 26)	1.75 m	33	57	(Romania) CSM Corona Brașov
77	P	Crina Pintea	3 April 1990 (age 36)	1.92 m	120	204	(Romania) CSM București
99	LB	Sorina Grozav	27 May 1999 (age 27)	1.75 m	32	93	(Romania) CSM Corona Brașov

=== Notable players ===
IHF World Player of the Year

- Cristina Neagu (left back), 2010, 2015, 2016 and 2018

EHF Player of the Year

- Cristina Neagu (left back), 2017, 2018

MVP

- Cristina Neagu (left back), 2015 World Championship

All-Star Team members

- Irina Klimovschi (goalkeeper), 1956 World Championship, 1960 World Championship
- Doina Furcoi-Solomonov (pivot), 1975 World Championship
- Mariana Tîrcă (right back), 1995 World Championship
- Luminiţa Dinu (goalkeeper), 2000 European Championship, 2005 World Championship
- Valentina Ardean-Elisei (left wing), 2005 World Championship, 2008 European Championship, 2015 World Championship
- Ionela Stanca (pivot), 2007 World Championship
- Ramona Farcău (right wing), 2008 Summer Olympics
- Cristina Neagu (left back), 2010 European Championship, 2014 European Championship, 2016 European Championship, 2015 World Championship
- Crina Pintea (pivot), 2018 European Championship

Top scorers

- Victoria Dumitrescu (left back), 1956 World Championship
- Carmen Amariei (left back), 1999 World Championship
- Simona Gogîrlă (left back), 2000 European Championship
- Ramona Farcău (right wing), 2008 Summer Olympics
- Cristina Vărzaru (right wing), 2009–2010 EHF Champions League
- Cristina Neagu (left back), 2010 European Championship, 2015 World Championship, 2014–2015 EHF Champions League, 2017–2018 EHF Champions League, 2019-2020 EHF Champions League, 2020-2021 EHF Champions League, 2021-2022 EHF Champions League

Other notable players

- Cristina Petrovici
- Simona Arghir-Sandu
- Maria Török-Duca
- Valentina Cozma
- Steluța Luca

Medal leaders
World Championship

Player	Gold
Irina Klimovschi	Gold medal Gold medal Gold medal
Ana Starck-Stănișel	Gold medal Gold medal Gold medal
Iozefina Ștefănescu	Gold medal Gold medal Gold medal
Victoria Dumitrescu	Gold medal Gold medal Gold medal
Maria Constantinescu	Gold medal Gold medal Gold medal
Aurelia Szőke-Tudor	Gold medal Gold medal Gold medal

=== Coaching history ===
Period	Head Coach
1953–1965	(Romania) Constantin Popescu
1965–1969	(Romania) Francisc Spier
1969	(Romania) Valeriu Gogâltan
1969–1970	(Romania) Pompiliu Simion
1971–1973	(Romania) Gabriel Zugrăvescu
1973–1976	(Romania) Constantin Popescu
1976–1978	(Romania) Francisc Spier
1978–1982	(Romania) Constantin Lache
1982–1986	(Romania) Eugen Bartha
1986–1993	(Romania) Bogdan Macovei
1993–1994	(Romania) Gheorghe Sbora
1994–1995	(Romania) Gheorghe Tadici
1995–1996	(Romania) Gheorghe Ionescu
1996–1999	(Romania) Cornel Bădulescu
1999–2000	(Romania) Bogdan Macovei
2000–2002	(Romania) Dumitru Muși
2002–2005	(Romania) Cornel Oțelea
2005–2008	(Romania) Gheorghe Tadici
2008–2012	(Romania) Radu Voina
2012–2015	(Romania) Gheorghe Tadici
2015–2016	(Sweden) Tomas Ryde
2016–2019	(Spain) Ambros Martín
2019–2020	(Sweden) Tomas Ryde
2020–2021	(Romania) Bogdan Burcea
2021–2022	(Romania) Adrian Vasile
2022–2025	(Romania) Florentin Pera
2025–	(Romania) Ovidiu Mihăilă

=== Individual all-time records ===
==== Most matches played ====
Total number of matches played in official competitions only.

#	Player	Matches
1	Mariana Tîrcă	335
2	Valentina Cozma	322
3	Aurelia Brădeanu	273
4	Valentina Ardean-Elisei	256
5	Marilena Doiciu	237
6	Maria Török-Duca	226
7	Steluța Luca	223
8	Ramona Farcău	214
9	Simona Arghir-Sandu	206
9	Lidia Drăgănescu	206

Last updated: 29 September 2019

==== Most goals scored ====
Total number of goals scored in official matches only.

#	Player	Goals	Matches	Average
1	Mariana Tîrcă	2043	335	6.09
2	Steluța Luca	1013	223	4.54
3	Valentina Cozma	980	322	3.04
4	Valentina Ardean-Elisei	915	256	3.57
5	Carmen Amariei	855	182	4.69
6	Cristina Neagu	830	198	4.12
7	Ramona Farcău	689	214	3.21
8	Aurelia Brădeanu	685	273	2.50
9	Lidia Drăgănescu	658	206	3.19
10	Maria Török-Duca	626	226	2.76

Last updated: 29 September 2019

== See also ==
- Romania women's national youth handball team
- Romania women's national junior handball team
- Romania men's national handball team
