= IHF World Women's Field Handball Championship =

World championship of field handball

- Sport: Field handball
- Founded: 1949
- Founder: International Handball Federation (IHF)
- First season: 1949
- No. of teams: 6
- Continent: International (IHF)
- Most recent champion: Romania (2nd title)
- Most titles: Romania (2 titles)

IHF World Women's Field Handball Championship was the world championship of field handball and was organized by the International Handball Federation in the period 1949-1960.

== Tournament ==
Year	Host country	Gold medal game			Bronze medal game
Year	Host country	Gold	Score	Silver	Bronze	Score	Fourth place
1949; Details	Hungary	Hungary	Round-robin	Austria	Czechoslovakia	Round-robin	France
1956; Details	West Germany	Romania	6–5	West Germany	Hungary	8–6	Austria
1960; Details	Netherlands	Romania	10–2	Austria	Germany^{1}	3–1	Netherlands

^{1}: Germany sent a united team composed of players from the GDR and the FRG.

=== Medal table ===
Rank	Nation	Gold	Silver	Bronze	Total
1	Romania	2	0	0	2
2	Hungary	1	0	1	2
3	Austria	0	2	0	2
4	West Germany	0	1	0	1
5	Czechoslovakia	0	0	1	1
5	Germany	0	0	1	1
Totals (6 entries)		3	3	3	9

=== National team appearances ===
Best result of participants

Best result for discontinued states

==== Comprehensive team results by tournament ====
Source: IHF official site.

Legend

- 1st – Champions
- 2nd – Runners-up
- 3rd – Third place
- 4th – Fourth place
- 5th – Fifth place
- 6th – Sixth place
- • — Did not qualify
- × — Did not enter
- — Hosts

For each tournament, the number of teams in each finals tournament (in brackets) are shown.

Team	(Hungary); 1949 (4)	(West Germany); 1956 (6)	(Romania); 1960 (6)	Total
Austria	2nd	4th	2nd	3
Denmark	×	×	5th	1
France	4th	6th	×	2
Germany (including West Germany)	×	2nd	3rd	2
Hungary	1st	3rd	×	2
Netherlands	×	•	4th	1
Poland	×	•	6th	1
Romania	×	1st	1st	2
Discontinued teams
Czechoslovakia	3rd	×	×	1
Yugoslavia	×	5th	×	1

=== Largest margins of victory ===
Margin	Winning team	Score	Opponent	WC
8	Romania	10–2	Austria	1960
7	Austria	8–1	France	1949
7	Yugoslavia	10–3	France	1949
5	Hungary	7–2	Austria	1949
5	Romania	6–1	Denmark	1960
4	Romania	9–4	Netherlands	1960
4	Hungary	7–3	France	1949
4	Romania	6–2	Austria	1960
