= List of 1988 Summer Olympics medal winners =

The 1988 Summer Olympics were held in Seoul, South Korea from September 17 to October 2.

== Archery ==
Events	Gold	Silver	Bronze
Men's individual	Jay Barrs; United States	Park Sung-soo; South Korea	Vladimir Yesheyev; Soviet Union
Men's team	South Korea; Chun In-Soo; Lee Han-Sup; Park Sung-soo	United States; Jay Barrs; Richard McKinney; Darrell Pace	Great Britain; Steven Hallard; Richard Priestman; Leroy Watson
Women's individual	Kim Soo-nyung; South Korea	Wang Hee-kyung; South Korea	Yun Young-sook; South Korea
Women's team	South Korea; Kim Soo-nyung; Wang Hee-kyung; Yun Young-sook	Indonesia; Lilies Handayani; Nurfitriyana Saiman; Kusuma Wardhani	United States; Deborah Ochs; Denise Parker; Melanie Skillman

== Athletics ==
=== Men ===
Event	Gold		Silver		Bronze	
100 metres^{†}	Carl Lewis; United States	9.92 (WR)	Linford Christie; Great Britain	9.97 (ER)	Calvin Smith; United States	9.99
200 metres	Joe DeLoach; United States	19.75	Carl Lewis; United States	19.79	Robson da Silva; Brazil	20.04
400 metres	Steve Lewis; United States	43.87	Butch Reynolds; United States	43.93	Danny Everett; United States	44.09
800 metres	Paul Ereng; Kenya	1:43.45	Joaquim Cruz; Brazil	1:43.90	Saïd Aouita; Morocco	1:44.06
1500 metres	Peter Rono; Kenya	3:35.96	Peter Elliott; Great Britain	3:36.15	Jens-Peter Herold; East Germany	3:36.21
5000 metres	John Ngugi; Kenya	13:11.70	Dieter Baumann; West Germany	13:15.52	Hansjörg Kunze; East Germany	13:15.73
10,000 metres	Brahim Boutayeb; Morocco	27:21.44 (OR)	Salvatore Antibo; Italy	27:23.55	Kipkemboy Kimeli; Kenya	27:25.16
110 metres hurdles	Roger Kingdom; United States	12.98	Colin Jackson; Great Britain	13.28	Tonie Campbell; United States	13.38
400 metres hurdles	Andre Phillips; United States	47.19	Amadou Dia Ba; Senegal	47.23 (NR)	Edwin Moses; United States	47.56
3000 metres steeplechase	Julius Kariuki; Kenya	8:05.51 (OR)	Peter Koech; Kenya	8:06.79	Mark Rowland; Great Britain	8:07.96
4 × 100 metres relay	Soviet Union; Viktor Bryzhin; Vladimir Krylov; Vladimir Muravyov; Vitaliy Savin	38.19	Great Britain; Elliot Bunney; John Regis; Linford Christie; Mike McFarlane; Clarence Callender*	38.28	France; Bruno Marie-Rose; Daniel Sangouma; Gilles Quenehervé; Max Morinière	38.40
4 × 400 metres relay	United States; Danny Everett; Steve Lewis; Kevin Robinzine; Butch Reynolds; Antonio McKay*; Andrew Valmon*	2:56.16	Jamaica; Howard Davis; Devon Morris; Winthrop Graham; Bert Cameron; Trevor Graham*; Howard Burnett*	3:00.30	West Germany; Norbert Dobeleit; Edgar Itt; Jörg Vaihinger; Ralf Lübke; Mark Henrich*; Bodo Kuhn*	3:00.56
Marathon	Gelindo Bordin; Italy	2:10:32	Douglas Wakiihuri; Kenya	2:10:47	Hussein Ahmed Salah; Djibouti	2:10:59
20 kilometres walk	Jozef Pribilinec; Czechoslovakia	1:19:57	Ronald Weigel; East Germany	1:20:00	Maurizio Damilano; Italy	1:20:14
50 kilometres walk	Vyacheslav Ivanenko; Soviet Union	3:38:29 (OR)	Ronald Weigel; East Germany	3:38:56	Hartwig Gauder; East Germany	3:39:45
Long jump	Carl Lewis; United States	8.72 m	Mike Powell; United States	8.49 m	Larry Myricks; United States	8.27 m
Triple jump	Khristo Markov; Bulgaria	17.61 m	Igor Lapshin; Soviet Union	17.52 m	Aleksandr Kovalenko; Soviet Union	17.42 m
High jump	Hennadiy Avdyeyenko; Soviet Union	2.38 m	Hollis Conway; United States	2.36 m	Rudolf Povarnitsyn; Soviet Union	2.36 m
High jump	Hennadiy Avdyeyenko; Soviet Union	2.38 m	Hollis Conway; United States	2.36 m	Patrik Sjöberg; Sweden	2.36 m
Pole vault	Sergei Bubka; Soviet Union	5.90 m	Radion Gataullin; Soviet Union	5.85 m	Grigoriy Yegorov; Soviet Union	5.80 m
Shot put	Ulf Timmermann; East Germany	22.47 m (OR)	Randy Barnes; United States	22.39 m	Werner Günthör; Switzerland	21.99 m
Discus throw	Jürgen Schult; East Germany	68.82 m	Romas Ubartas; Soviet Union	67.48 m	Rolf Danneberg; West Germany	67.38 m
Hammer throw	Sergey Litvinov; Soviet Union	84.80 m (OR)	Yuriy Sedykh; Soviet Union	83.76 m	Jüri Tamm; Soviet Union	81.16 m
Javelin throw	Tapio Korjus; Finland	84.28 m	Jan Železný; Czechoslovakia	84.12 m	Seppo Räty; Finland	83.26 m
Decathlon	Christian Schenk; East Germany	8488	Torsten Voss; East Germany	8399	Dave Steen; Canada	8328

- ^{†} = Ben Johnson led the 100 metres at 9.79sec but was disqualified for doping.

=== Women ===
Event	Gold		Silver		Bronze	
100 metres	Florence Griffith Joyner; United States	10.54 (OR)	Evelyn Ashford; United States	10.83	Heike Drechsler; East Germany	10.85
200 metres	Florence Griffith Joyner; United States	21.34 (WR)	Grace Jackson; Jamaica	21.72	Heike Drechsler; East Germany	21.95
400 metres	Olga Bryzgina; Soviet Union	48.65	Petra Müller; East Germany	49.45	Olga Nazarova; Soviet Union	49.90
800 metres	Sigrun Wodars; East Germany	1:56.10	Christine Wachtel; East Germany	1:56.64	Kim Gallagher; United States	1:56.91
1500 metres	Paula Ivan; Romania	3:53.96 (OR)	Laimutė Baikauskaitė; Soviet Union	4:00.24	Tetyana Samolenko; Soviet Union	4:00.30
3000 metres	Tetyana Samolenko; Soviet Union	8:26.53	Paula Ivan; Romania	8:27.15	Yvonne Murray; Great Britain	8:29.02
10,000 metres	Olga Bondarenko; Soviet Union	31:05.21	Liz McColgan; Great Britain	31:08.44	Yelena Zhupiyeva; Soviet Union	31:19.82
100 metres hurdles	Yordanka Donkova; Bulgaria	12.38 (OR)	Gloria Siebert; East Germany	12.61	Claudia Zackiewicz; West Germany	12.75
400 metres hurdles	Debbie Flintoff-King; Australia	53.17	Tatyana Ledovskaya; Soviet Union	53.18	Ellen Fiedler; East Germany	53.63
4 × 100 metres relay	United States; Alice Brown; Sheila Echols; Florence Griffith Joyner; Evelyn Ashford; Dannette Young*	41.98	East Germany; Silke Gladisch-Möller; Kerstin Behrendt; Ingrid Lange; Marlies Oelsner-Gohr	42.09	Soviet Union; Lyudmila Kondratyeva; Galina Malchugina; Marina Zhirova; Natalya Pomoshchnikova; Maia Azarashvili*	42.75
4 × 400 metres relay	Soviet Union; Tatyana Ledovskaya; Olga Nazarova; Mariya Pinigina; Olha Bryzhina; Lyudmyla Dzhyhalova*	3:15.17 (WR)	United States; Denean Howard; Diane Dixon; Valerie Brisco-Hooks; Florence Griffith Joyner; Sherri Howard*; Lillie Leatherwood*	3:15.51	East Germany; Dagmar Neubauer; Kirsten Emmelmann; Sabine Busch; Petra Muller; Grit Breuer*	3:18.29
Marathon	Rosa Mota; Portugal	2:25:40	Lisa Martin-Ondieki; Australia	2:25:53	Katrin Dörre; East Germany	2:26:21
Long jump	Jackie Joyner-Kersee; United States	7.40 m (OR)	Heike Drechsler; East Germany	7.22 m	Galina Chistyakova; Soviet Union	7.11 m
High jump	Louise Ritter; United States	2.03 m	Stefka Kostadinova; Bulgaria	2.01 m	Tamara Bykova; Soviet Union	1.99 m
Shot put	Natalya Lisovskaya; Soviet Union	22.24 m	Kathrin Neimke; East Germany	21.07 m	Li Meisu; China	21.06 m
Discus throw	Martina Hellmann; East Germany	72.30 m (OR)	Diana Gansky; East Germany	71.88 m	Tsvetanka Khristova; Bulgaria	69.74 m
Javelin throw	Petra Felke; East Germany	74.68 m (OR)	Fatima Whitbread; Great Britain	70.32 m	Beate Koch; East Germany	67.30 m
Heptathlon	Jackie Joyner-Kersee; United States	7291 (WR)	Sabine John; East Germany	6897	Anke Behmer; East Germany	6858

- * = Athletes who ran in preliminary rounds and also received medals.

== Basketball ==
Events	Gold	Silver	Bronze
Men's	Soviet Union; Aleksandr Volkov; Tiit Sokk; Sergei Tarakanov; Šarūnas Marčiulionis; Igors Miglinieks; Valeri Tikhonenko; Rimas Kurtinaitis; Arvydas Sabonis; Viktor Pankrashkin; Valdemaras Chomičius; Aleksandr Belostennyi; Valeri Goborov	Yugoslavia; Dražen Petrović; Zdravko Radulović; Zoran Čutura; Toni Kukoč; Žarko Paspalj; Željko Obradović; Jure Zdovc; Stojko Vranković; Vlade Divac; Franjo Arapović; Dino Rađa; Danko Cvjetićanin	United States; Mitch Richmond; Charles Smith IV; Bimbo Coles; Hersey Hawkins; Jeff Grayer; Charles D. Smith; Willie Anderson; Stacey Augmon; Dan Majerle; Danny Manning; J. R. Reid; David Robinson
Women's	United States; Teresa Edwards; Kamie Ethridge; Cynthia Brown; Anne Donovan; Teresa Weatherspoon; Bridgette Gordon; Victoria Bullett; Andrea Lloyd; Katrina McClain; Jennifer Gillom; Cynthia Cooper; Suzanne McConnell	Yugoslavia; Stojna Vangelovska; Mara Lakić; Žana Lelas; Eleonora Wild; Kornelija Kvesić; Danira Nakić; Slađana Golić; Polona Dornik; Razija Mujanović; Vesna Bajkuša; Anđelija Arbutina; Bojana Milošević	Soviet Union; Olga Yevkova; Irina Gerlits; Olesya Barel; Irina Sumnikova; Olga Buryakina; Olga Yakovleva; Irina Minkh; Aleksandra Leonova; Yelena Khudashova; Vitalija Tuomaitė; Natalya Zasulskaya; Galina Savitskaya

== Boxing ==
Games	Gold	Silver	Bronze
Light Flyweight (– 48 kg)	Ivailo Marinov; Bulgaria	Michael Carbajal; United States	Leopoldo Serantes; Philippines
Light Flyweight (– 48 kg)	Ivailo Marinov; Bulgaria	Michael Carbajal; United States	Róbert Isaszegi; Hungary
Flyweight (– 51 kg)	Kim Kwang-sun; South Korea	Andreas Tews; East Germany	Mario González; Mexico
Flyweight (– 51 kg)	Kim Kwang-sun; South Korea	Andreas Tews; East Germany	Timofey Skryabin; Soviet Union
Bantamweight (– 54 kg)	Kennedy McKinney; United States	Aleksandar Khristov; Bulgaria	Jorge Julio Rocha; Colombia
Bantamweight (– 54 kg)	Kennedy McKinney; United States	Aleksandar Khristov; Bulgaria	Phajol Moolsan; Thailand
Featherweight (– 57 kg)	Giovanni Parisi; Italy	Daniel Dumitrescu; Romania	Lee Jae-hyuk; South Korea
Featherweight (– 57 kg)	Giovanni Parisi; Italy	Daniel Dumitrescu; Romania	Abdelhak Achik; Morocco
Lightweight (– 60 kg)	Andreas Zülow; East Germany	George Cramne; Sweden	Nergüin Enkhbat; Mongolia
Lightweight (– 60 kg)	Andreas Zülow; East Germany	George Cramne; Sweden	Romallis Ellis; United States
Light Welterweight (– 63.5 kg)	Vyacheslav Yanovski; Soviet Union	Grahame Cheney; Australia	Lars Myrberg; Sweden
Light Welterweight (– 63.5 kg)	Vyacheslav Yanovski; Soviet Union	Grahame Cheney; Australia	Reiner Gies; West Germany
Welterweight (– 67 kg)	Robert Wangila; Kenya	Laurent Boudouani; France	Jan Dydak; Poland
Welterweight (– 67 kg)	Robert Wangila; Kenya	Laurent Boudouani; France	Kenneth Gould; United States
Light Middleweight (– 71 kg)	Park Si-hun; South Korea	Roy Jones Jr. United States	Raymond Downey; Canada
Light Middleweight (– 71 kg)	Park Si-hun; South Korea	Roy Jones Jr. United States	Richard Woodhall; Great Britain
Middleweight (– 75 kg)	Henry Maske; East Germany	Egerton Marcus; Canada	Chris Sande; Kenya
Middleweight (– 75 kg)	Henry Maske; East Germany	Egerton Marcus; Canada	Hussain Shah; Pakistan
Light Heavyweight (– 81 kg)	Andrew Maynard; United States	Nurmagomed Shanavazov; Soviet Union	Damir Škaro; Yugoslavia
Light Heavyweight (– 81 kg)	Andrew Maynard; United States	Nurmagomed Shanavazov; Soviet Union	Henryk Petrich; Poland
Heavyweight (– 91 kg)	Ray Mercer; United States	Baik Hyun-man; South Korea	Andrzej Golota; Poland
Heavyweight (– 91 kg)	Ray Mercer; United States	Baik Hyun-man; South Korea	Arnold Vanderlyde; Netherlands
Super Heavyweight (+ 91 kg)	Lennox Lewis; Canada	Riddick Bowe; United States	Aleksandr Miroshnichenko; Soviet Union
Super Heavyweight (+ 91 kg)	Lennox Lewis; Canada	Riddick Bowe; United States	Janusz Zarenkiewicz; Poland

== Canoeing ==
=== Men's events ===
Events	Gold	Silver	Bronze
C-1 500 metres	Olaf Heukrodt; East Germany	Michał Śliwiński; Soviet Union	Martin Marinov; Bulgaria
C-1 1000 metres	Ivans Klementyev; Soviet Union	Jörg Schmidt; East Germany	Nikolay Bukhalov; Bulgaria
C-2 500 metres	Viktor Reneysky and Nicolae Juravschi; Soviet Union	Marek Dopierała and Marek Łbik; Poland	Philippe Renaud and Joël Bettin; France
C-2 1000 metres	Viktor Reneysky and Nicolae Juravschi; Soviet Union	Olaf Heukrodt and Ingo Spelly; East Germany	Marek Dopierała and Marek Łbik; Poland
K-1 500 metres	Zsolt Gyulay; Hungary	Andreas Stähle; East Germany	Paul MacDonald; New Zealand
K-1 1000 metres	Greg Barton; United States	Grant Davies; Australia	André Wohllebe; East Germany
K-2 500 metres	Ian Ferguson and Paul MacDonald; New Zealand	Igor Nagayev and Viktor Denisov; Soviet Union	Attila Ábrahám and Ferenc Csipes; Hungary
K-2 1000 metres	Greg Barton and Norman Bellingham; United States	Ian Ferguson and Paul MacDonald; New Zealand	Peter Foster and Kelvin Graham; Australia
K-4 1000 metres	Hungary; Zsolt Gyulay; Ferenc Csipes; Sándor Hódosi; Attila Ábrahám	Soviet Union; Aleksandr Motuzenko; Sergey Kirsanov; Igor Nagaev; Viktor Denisov	East Germany; Kay Bluhm; André Wohllebe; Andreas Stähle; Hans-Jörg Bliesener

=== Women's events ===
Events	Gold	Silver	Bronze
K-1 500 metres	Vanja Gesheva; Bulgaria	Birgit Schmidt; East Germany	Izabela Dylewska; Poland
K-2 500 metres	Birgit Schmidt and Anke Nothnagel; East Germany	Vanja Gesheva and Diana Paliiska; Bulgaria	Annemiek Derckx and Annemarie Cox; Netherlands
K-4 500 metres	East Germany; Birgit Schmidt; Anke Nothnagel; Ramona Portwich; Heike Singer	Hungary; Erika Géczi; Erika Mészáros; Éva Rakusz; Rita Kőbán	Bulgaria; Vanja Gesheva; Diana Paliiska; Ogniana Petkova; Borislava Ivanova

== Cycling ==
=== Men's ===
Events	Gold	Silver	Bronze
road race	Olaf Ludwig; East Germany	Bernd Gröne; West Germany	Christian Henn; West Germany
team time trial	East Germany; Jan Schur; Uwe Ampler; Mario Kummer; Maik Landsmann	Poland; Andrzej Sypytkowski; Joachim Halupczok; Zenon Jaskuła; Marek Leśniewski	Sweden; Michel Lafis; Anders Jarl; Björn Johansson; Jan Karlsson
points race	Dan Frost; Denmark	Leo Peelen; Netherlands	Marat Ganeyev; Soviet Union
individual pursuit	Gintautas Umaras; Soviet Union	Dean Woods; Australia	Bernd Dittert; East Germany
team pursuit	Soviet Union; Viatcheslav Ekimov; Artūras Kasputis; Dmitry Nelyubin; Gintautas Umaras	East Germany; Carsten Wolf; Steffen Blochwitz; Roland Hennig; Dirk Meier	Australia; Scott McGrory; Dean Woods; Brett Dutton; Wayne McCarney; Stephen McGlede
sprint	Lutz Heßlich; East Germany	Nikolay Kovsh; Soviet Union	Gary Neiwand; Australia
1 km time trial	Aleksandr Kirichenko; Soviet Union	Martin Vinnicombe; Australia	Robert Lechner; West Germany

=== Women's ===
Events	Gold	Silver	Bronze
road race	Monique Knol; Netherlands	Jutta Niehaus; West Germany	Laima Zilporite; Soviet Union
sprint	Erika Salumäe; Soviet Union	Christa Luding-Rothenburger; East Germany	Connie Young; United States

== Diving ==
=== Men ===
Events	Gold	Silver	Bronze
3 m springboard	Greg Louganis; United States	Tan Liangde; China	Li Deliang; China
10 m platform	Greg Louganis; United States	Xiong Ni; China	Jesús Mena; Mexico

=== Women ===
Events	Gold	Silver	Bronze
3 m springboard	Gao Min; China	Li Qing; China	Kelly McCormick; United States
10 m platform	Xu Yanmei; China	Michele Mitchell; United States	Wendy Williams; United States

== Equestrian ==
Events	Gold	Silver	Bronze
Dressage individual	Nicole Uphoff and Rembrandt (FRG)	Margit Otto-Crépin and Corlandus (FRA)	Christine Stückelberger and Gauguin de Lully CH (SUI)
Dressage team	West Germany; Reiner Klimke and Ahlerich 2 Ann-Kathrin Linsenhoff and Courage 10; Monica Theodorescu and Ganimedes; Nicole Uphoff and Rembrandt	Switzerland; Otto Josef Hofer and Andiamo; Christine Stückelberger and Gauguin de Lully CH; Daniel Ramseier and Random; Samuel Schetzmann and Rochus	Canada; Cynthia Neale-Ishoy and Dynasty; Eva Maria Pracht and Emirage; Gina Smith and Malte; Ashley Nicoll and Reipo
Eventing individual	Mark Todd and Charisma (NZL)	Ian Stark and Sir Wattie (GBR)	Virginia Leng and Master Craftsman (GBR)
Eventing team	West Germany; Claus Erhorn and Justyn Thyme; Matthias Andreas Baumann and Shamrock 11; Thies Kaspareit and Sherry 42; Ralf Ehrenbrink and Uncle Todd	Great Britain; Captain Mark Phillips and Cartier; Karen Straker and Get Smart; Virginia Leng and Master Craftsman; Ian Stark and Sir Wattie	New Zealand; Mark Todd and Charisma; Margaret Knighton and Enterprise; Andrew Bennie and Grayshott; Tinks Pottinger and Volunteer
Jumping individual	Pierre Durand Jr. and Jappeloup (FRA)	Greg Best and Gem Twist (USA)	Karsten Huck and Nepomuk 8 (FRG)
Jumping team	West Germany; Ludger Beerbaum and The Freak; Wolfgang Brinkmann and Pedro; Dirk Hafemeister and Orchidee 76; Franke Sloothaak and Walzerkonig 19	United States; Greg Best and Gem Twist; Lisa Ann Jacquin and For the Moment; Anne Kursinski and Starman; Joseph Fargis and Mill Pearl	France; Hubert Bourdy and Morgat; Frédéric Cottier and Flambeau C Michel Robert and La Fayette; Pierre Durand Jr. and Jappeloup

== Fencing ==
=== Men ===
Events	Gold	Silver	Bronze
Individual épée	Arnd Schmitt; West Germany	Philippe Riboud; France	Andrey Shuvalov; Soviet Union
Team épée	France; Frederic Delpla; Jean-Michel Henry; Olivier Lenglet; Philippe Riboud; Éric Srecki	West Germany; Elmar Borrmann; Volker Fischer; Thomas Gerull; Alexander Pusch; Arnd Schmitt	Soviet Union; Andrey Shuvalov; Pavel Kolobkov; Vladimir Reznichenko; Mikhail Tishko; Igor Tikhomirov
Individual foil	Stefano Cerioni; Italy	Udo Wagner; East Germany	Alexandr Romankov; Soviet Union
Team foil	Soviet Union; Vladimer Aptsiauri; Anvar Ibragimov; Boris Koretsky; Ilgar Mamedov; Aleksander Romankov	West Germany; Matthias Behr; Thomas Endres; Matthias Gey; Ulrich Schreck; Thorsten Weidner	Hungary; István Busa; Zsolt Érsek; Róbert Gátai; Pál Szekeres; István Szelei
Individual sabre	Jean-François Lamour; France	Janusz Olech; Poland	Giovanni Scalzo; Italy
Team sabre	Hungary; Imre Bujdosó; László Csongrádi; Imre Gedővári; György Nébald; Bence Szabó	Soviet Union; Andrey Alshan; Mikhail Burtsev; Sergey Koryashkin; Sergey Mindirgasov; Heorhiy Pohosov	Italy; Massimo Cavaliere; Gianfranco Dalla Barba; Marco Marin; Ferdinando Meglio; Giovanni Scalzo

=== Women ===
Events	Gold	Silver	Bronze
Individual foil	Anja Fichtel; West Germany	Sabine Bau; West Germany	Zita Funkenhauser; West Germany
Team foil	West Germany; Sabine Bau; Anja Fichtel; Zita Funkenhauser; Anette Klug; Christiane Weber	Italy; Francesca Bortolozzi Borella; Annapia Gandolfi; Lucia Traversa; Dorina Vaccaroni; Margherita Zalaffi	Hungary; Zsuzsa Jánosi; Edit Kovács; Gertrúd Stefanek; Zsuzsanna Szőcs; Katalin Tuschák

== Field hockey ==
Events	Gold	Silver	Bronze
Men's	Great Britain Paul Barber; Stephen Batchelor; Kulbir Bhaura; Robert Clift; Richard Dodds; David Faulkner; Russell Garcia; Martyn Grimley; Sean Kerly; Jimmy Kirkwood; Richard Leman; Stephen Martin; Veryan Pappin; Jon Potter; Imran Sherwani; Ian Taylor	West Germany Stefan Blöcher; Dirk Brinkmann; Thomas Brinkmann; Heiner Dopp; Hans-Henning Fastrich; Carsten Fischer; Tobias Frank; Volker Fried; Horst-Ulrich Hänel; Michael Hilgers; Andreas Keller; Michael Metz; Andreas Mollandin; Thomas Reck; Christian Schliemann; Ekkhard Schmidt-Opper	Netherlands Marc Benninga; Floris Jan Bovelander; Jan Bart Bodenhausen; Jacques Brinkman; Maurits Crucq; Marc Delissen; Cees Jan Diepeveen; Patrick Faber; Ronald Jansen; René Klaassen; Hendrik Kooijman; Hidde Kruize; Frank Leistra; Erik Parlevliet; Gert Schlatmann; Tim Steens; Taco van den Honert
Women's	Australia Tracey Belbin; Deborah Bowman; Lee Capes; Michelle Capes; Sally Carbon; Elspeth Clement; Loretta Dorman; Maree Fish; Rechelle Hawkes; Lorraine Hillas; Kathleen Partridge; Sharon Patmore; Jackie Pereira; Sandra Pisani; Kim Small; Liane Tooth	South Korea Chang Eun-Jung; Cho Ki-Hyang; Choi Choon-Ok; Chung Eun-Kyung; Chung Sang-Hyun; Han Gum Shil; Han Ok-Kyung; Hwang Keum-Sook; Jin Won-Sim; Kim Mi-Sun; Kim Soon-Duk; Kim Young-sook; Lim Kye-Sook; Park Soon-Ja; Seo Hyo-Sun; Seo Kwang-Mi	Netherlands Willemien Aardenburg; Carina Benninga; Marjolein Eijsvogel; Yvonne Buter; Det de Beus; Annemieke Fokke; Noor Holsboer; Helen van der Ben; Lisanne Lejeune; Anneloes Nieuwenhuizen; Martine Ohr; Marieke van Doorn; Aletta van Manen; Sophie von Weiler; Laurien Willemse; Ingrid Wolff

== Football ==
Events	Gold	Silver	Bronze
Men's	Soviet Union; Aleksandr Borodyuk; Oleksiy Cherednyk; Igor Dobrovolski; Sergei Fokin; Sergei Gorlukovich; Arvydas Janonis; Gela Ketashvili; Dmitry Kharin; Yevgeni Kuznetsov; Viktor Losev; Volodymyr Lyuty; Oleksiy Mykhaylychenko; Arminas Narbekovas; Igor Ponomarev; Yury Savichev; Igor Sklyarov; Vladimir Tatarchuk; Yevgeny Yarovenko Alexei Prudnikov; Vadym Tyshchenko	Brazil; Ademir; Aloísio; Andrade; Batista; Bebeto; Careca; André Cruz; Edmar; Geovani; João Paulo; Jorginho; Milton; Neto; Romário; Cláudio Taffarel; Luiz Carlos Winck Ricardo Gomes; Mazinho; Valdo Filho; Zé Carlos	West Germany; Rudi Bommer; Holger Fach; Wolfgang Funkel; Armin Görtz; Roland Grahammer; Thomas Häßler; Thomas Hörster; Olaf Janßen; Uwe Kamps; Gerhard Kleppinger; Jürgen Klinsmann; Frank Mill; Karl-Heinz Riedle; Christian Schreier; Michael Schulz; Ralf Sievers; Fritz Walter; Wolfram Wuttke Oliver Reck; Gunnar Sauer

Note: The players above the line played at least one game in this tournament, the players below the line were only squad members. Nevertheless, the International Olympic Committee medal database credits them all as medalists.

== Gymnastics ==
=== Men's ===
Events	Gold	Silver	Bronze
Team all-around	Soviet Union; Vladimir Artemov; Dmitri Bilozertchev; Vladimir Gogoladze; Sergei Kharkov; Valeri Liukin; Vladimir Nouvikov	East Germany; Holger Behrendt; Ralf Büchner; Ulf Hoffmann; Sylvio Kroll; Sven Tippelt; Andreas Wecker	Japan; Yukio Iketani; Hiroyuki Konishi; Koichi Mizushima; Daisuke Nishikawa; Toshiharu Sato; Takahiro Yameda
Individual all-around	Vladimir Artemov; Soviet Union	Valeri Liukin; Soviet Union	Dmitry Bilozerchev; Soviet Union
Floor exercise	Sergei Kharkov; Soviet Union	Vladimir Artemov; Soviet Union	Lou Yun; China
Floor exercise	Sergei Kharkov; Soviet Union	Vladimir Artemov; Soviet Union	Yukio Iketani; Japan
Horizontal bar	Vladimir Artemov; Soviet Union	none awarded	Holger Behrendt; East Germany
Horizontal bar	Valeri Liukin; Soviet Union	none awarded	Marius Gherman; Romania
Parallel bars	Vladimir Artemov; Soviet Union	Valeri Liukin; Soviet Union	Sven Tippelt; East Germany
Pommel horse	Lyubomir Gueraskov; Bulgaria	none awarded	none awarded
Pommel horse	Zsolt Borkai; Hungary	none awarded	none awarded
Pommel horse	Dmitri Bilozertchev; Soviet Union	none awarded	none awarded
Rings	Holger Behrendt; East Germany	none awarded	Sven Tippelt; East Germany
Rings	Dimitri Bilozertchev; Soviet Union	none awarded	Sven Tippelt; East Germany
Vault	Lou Yun; China	Sylvio Kroll; East Germany	Park Jong-Hoon; South Korea

=== Women's ===
Events	Gold	Silver	Bronze
Team all-around	Soviet Union; Svetlana Baitova; Svetlana Boginskaya; Natalia Laschenova; Elena Shevchenko; Elena Shushunova; Olga Strazheva	Romania; Aurelia Dobre; Eugenia Golea; Celestina Popa; Gabriela Potorac; Daniela Silivaş; Camelia Voinea	East Germany; Gabriele Fähnrich; Martina Jentsch; Dagmar Kersten; Ulrike Klotz; Bettina Schieferdecker; Dörte Thümmler
Individual all-around	Elena Shushunova; Soviet Union	Daniela Silivaş; Romania	Svetlana Boginskaya; Soviet Union
Balance beam	Daniela Silivaş; Romania	Elena Shushunova; Soviet Union	Gabriela Potorac; Romania
Balance beam	Daniela Silivaş; Romania	Elena Shushunova; Soviet Union	Phoebe Mills; United States
Floor exercise	Daniela Silivaş; Romania	Svetlana Boginskaya; Soviet Union	Diana Doudeva; Bulgaria
Uneven bars	Daniela Silivaş; Romania	Dagmar Kersten; East Germany	Elena Shushunova; Soviet Union
Vault	Svetlana Boginskaya; Soviet Union	Gabriela Potorac; Romania	Daniela Silivaş; Romania
Rhythmic individual all-around	Marina Lobatch; Soviet Union	Adriana Dunavska; Bulgaria	Alexandra Timoshenko; Soviet Union

== Handball ==
Events	Gold	Silver	Bronze
Men's	Soviet Union; Vyacheslav Atavin; Igor Chumak; Valery Gopin; Aleksandr Karshakevich; Andrey Lavrov; Yuri Nesterov; Voldemaras Novickis; Aleksandr Rymanov; Konstantin Sharovarov; Yuri Shevtsov; Georgi Sviridenko; Aleksandr Tuchkin; Andrey Tyumentsev; Mikhail Vasilev	South Korea; Choi Suk-Jae; Kang Jae-Won; Kim Jae-hwan; Koh Suk-Chang; Lee Sang-Hyo; Lim Jin-Suk; Noh Hyun-Suk; Oh Young-Ki; Park Do-Hun; Park Young-Dae; Shim Jae-Hong; Shin Young-Suk; Yoon Tae-Il	Yugoslavia; Mirko Bašić; Jožef Holpert; Boris Jarak; Slobodan Kuzmanovski; Muhammed Memić; Alvaro Načinović; Goran Perkovac; Zlatko Portner; Iztok Puc; Rolando Pušnik; Momir Rnić; Zlatko Saračević; Irfan Smajlagić; Ermin Velić; Veselin Vujović
Women's	South Korea; Han Hyun-sook; Ki Mi-sook; Kim Choon-rye; Kim Hyun-mee; Kim Kyung-soon; Kim Myung-soon; Lee Ki-soon; Lim Mi-kyung; Shon Mi-Na; Song Ji-hyun; Suk Min-hee; Sung Kyung-hwa	Norway; Kjerstin Andersen; Berit Digre; Marte Eliasson; Susann Goksør; Trine Haltvik; Hanne Hegh; Hanne Hogness; Vibeke Johnsen; Kristin Midthun; Karin Pettersen; Karin Singstad; Annette Skotvoll; Ingrid Steen; Heidi Sundal; Cathrine Svendsen	Soviet Union; Natalya Anisimova; Maryna Bazhanova; Tatyana Dzhandzhgava; Elina Guseva; Tetyana Horb; Larysa Karlova; Natalya Lapitskaya; Svitlana Mankova; Nataliya Matryuk; Natalya Morskova; Olena Nemashkalo; Nataliya Rusnachenko; Olha Semenova; Yevheniya Tovstohan; Zinaida Turchyna

== Judo ==
Events	Gold	Silver	Bronze
Extra Lightweight; 60 kg	Kim Jae-yup; South Korea	Kevin Asano; United States	Shinji Hosokawa; Japan Amiran Totikashvili; Soviet Union
Half Lightweight; 65 kg	Lee Kyung-keun; South Korea	Janusz Pawłowski; Poland	Bruno Carabetta; France Yosuke Yamamoto; Japan
Lightweight; 71 kg	Marc Alexandre; France	Sven Loll; East Germany	Mike Swain; United States Georgy Tenadze; Soviet Union
Half Middleweight; 78 kg	Waldemar Legień; Poland	Frank Wieneke; West Germany	Torsten Bréchôt; East Germany Bashir Varaev; Soviet Union
Middleweight; 86 kg	Peter Seisenbacher; Austria	Vladimir Shestakov; Soviet Union	Akinobu Osako; Japan Ben Spijkers; Netherlands
Half Heavyweight; 95 kg	Aurélio Miguel; Brazil	Marc Meiling; West Germany	Dennis Stewart; Great Britain Robert Van de Walle; Belgium
Heavyweight +95 kg	Hitoshi Saito; Japan	Henry Stöhr; East Germany	Cho Yong-chul; South Korea Grigory Verichev; Soviet Union

== Modern pentathlon ==
Events	Gold	Silver	Bronze
Individual	János Martinek; Hungary	Carlo Massullo; Italy	Vakhtang Iagorashvili; Soviet Union
Team	Hungary; János Martinek, Attila Mizsér, László Fábián	Italy; Carlo Massullo, Daniele Masala, Gianluca Tiberti	Great Britain; Richard Phelps, Dominic Mahony, Graham Brookhouse

== Rowing ==
=== Men's events ===
Events	Gold	Silver	Bronze
Single Sculls (1x)	Thomas Lange (GDR); 6:49.86	Peter-Michael Kolbe (FRG); 6:54.77	Eric Verdonk (NZL); 6:58.66
Double Sculls (2x)	Nico Rienks and Ronald Florijn (NED); 6:21.13	Beat Schwerzmann and Ueli Bodenmann (SUI); 6:22.59	Aleksandr Marchenko and Vasil Yakusha (URS); 6:22.87
Quadruple Sculls (4x)	Italy; Agostino Abbagnale; Davide Tizzano; Gianluca Farina; Piero Poli; 5:53.37	Norway; Alf Hansen; Rolf Thorsen; Lars Bjønness; Vetle Vinje; 5:55.08	East Germany; Jens Köppen; Steffen Zühlke; Steffen Bogs; Heiko Habermann; 5:56.13
Coxlees Pair (2-)	Andy Holmes and Steve Redgrave (GBR); 6:36.84	Dănuț Dobre and Dragoș Neagu (ROU); 6:38.06	Sadik Mujkič and Bojan Prešern (YUG); 6:41.01
Coxed Pair (2+)	Italy; Carmine Abbagnale; Giuseppe Abbagnale; Giuseppe Di Capua (cox); 6:58.79	East Germany; Mario Streit; Detlef Kirchhoff; René Rensch (cox); 7:00.63	Great Britain; Andy Holmes; Steve Redgrave; Patrick Sweeney (cox); 7:01.95
Coxless Four (4-)	East Germany; Roland Schröder; Ralf Brudel; Olaf Förster; Thomas Greiner; 6:03.11	United States; Raoul Rodriguez; Thomas Bohrer; Richard Kennelly; David Krmpotich; 6:05.53	West Germany; Guido Grabow; Volker Grabow; Norbert Keßlau; Jörg Puttlitz; 6:06.22
Coxed Four (4+)	East Germany; Bernd Niesecke; Hendrik Reiher (cox); Karsten Schmeling; Bernd Eichwurzel; Frank Klawonn; 6:10.74	Romania; Dimitrie Popescu; Ioan Snep; Vasile Tomoiagă; Ladislau Lovrenschi (cox); Valentin Robu; 6:13.58	New Zealand; Chris White; Ian Wright; Andrew Bird (cox); Greg Johnston; George Keys; 6:15.78
Eight (8+)	West Germany; Bahne Rabe; Eckhardt Schultz; Ansgar Wessling; Wolfgang Maennig; Matthias Mellinghaus; Thomas Möllenkamp; Thomas Domian; Armin Eichholz; Manfred Klein (cox); 5:46.05	Soviet Union; Viktor Omelyanovich; Vasily Tikhonov; Andrey Vasilyev; Pavlo Hurkovskiy; Nikolay Komarov; Veniamin But; Viktor Diduk; Aleksandr Dumchev; Aleksandr Lukyanov (cox); 5:48.01	United States; Mike Teti; Jonathan Smith; Ted Patton; Jack Rusher; Peter Nordell; Jeffrey McLaughlin; Doug Burden; John Pescatore; Seth Bauer (cox); 5:48.26

=== Women's events ===
Events	Gold	Silver	Bronze
Single Sculls (1x)	Jutta Behrendt (GDR); 7:47.19	Anne Marden (USA); 7:47.19	Magdalena Georgieva (BUL); 7:53.65
Double Sculls (2x)	Birgit Peter and Martina Schröter (GDR); 7:00.48	Elisabeta Lipă and Veronica Cogeanu (ROU); 7:04.36	Violeta Ninova and Stefka Madina (BUL); 7:06.03
Quadruple Sculls (4x)	East Germany; Kerstin Förster; Kristina Mundt; Beate Schramm; Jana Sorgers; 6:21.06	Soviet Union; Irina Kalimbet; Svitlana Maziy; Inna Frolova; Antonina Zelikovich; 6:23.47	Romania; Anișoara Bălan; Anişoara Minea; Veronica Cogeanu; Elisabeta Lipă; 6:23.81
Coxless Pair (2-)	Rodica Arba and Olga Homeghi (ROU); 7:28.13	Radka Stoyanova and Lalka Berberova (BUL); 7:31.95	Nikki Payne and Lynley Hannen (NZL); 7:35.68
Coxed Four (4+)	East Germany; Martina Walther; Gerlinde Doberschütz; Carola Hornig; Birte Siech; Sylvia Rose; 6:56.00	China; Zhang Xianghua; Hu Yadong; Yang Xiao; Zhou Shouying; Li Ronghua; 6:58.78	Romania; Marioara Trașcă; Veronica Necula; Herta Anitaș; Doina Șnep-Bălan; Ecaterina Oancia; 7:01.13
Eight (8+)	East Germany; Annegret Strauch; Judith Zeidler; Kathrin Haacker; Ute Wild; Anja Kluge; Beatrix Schröer; Ramona Balthasar; Ute Stange; Daniela Neunast; 6:15.17	Romania; Doina Șnep-Bălan; Veronica Necula; Herta Anitaș; Marioara Trașcă; Adriana Bazon; Mihaela Armășescu; Rodica Arba; Olga Homeghi; Ecaterina Oancia; 6:17.44	China; Zhou Xiuhua; Zhang Yali; He Yanwen; Han Yaqin; Zhang Xianghua; Zhou Shouying; Yang Xiao; Hu Yadong; Li Ronghua; 6:21.83

== Sailing ==
=== Women's event ===
Events	Gold	Silver	Bronze
Women's 470	United States (USA); Allison Jolly; Lynne Jewell	Sweden (SWE); Marit Söderström; Birgitta Bengtsson	Soviet Union (URS); Larisa Moskalenko; Iryna Chunykhovska

=== Men's events ===
Events	Gold	Silver	Bronze
Men's Division II	New Zealand (NZL); Bruce Kendall	Netherlands Antilles (AHO); Jan Boersma	United States (USA); Mike Gebhardt
Finn	Spain (ESP); Jose Doreste	Virgin Islands (ISV); Peter Holmberg	New Zealand (NZL); John Cutler
Men's 470	France (FRA); Thierry Peponnet; Luc Pillot	Soviet Union (URS); Tõnu Tõniste; Toomas Tõniste	United States (USA); John Shadden; Charles McKee

=== Open events ===
Events	Gold	Silver	Bronze
Flying Dutchman	Denmark (DEN); Jørgen Bojsen-Møller; Christian Grønborg	Norway (NOR); Ole Pollen; Erik Björkum	Canada (CAN); Frank McLaughlin; John Millen
Tornado	France (FRA); Jean Le Deroff; Nicolas Hénard	New Zealand (NZL); Chris Timms; Rex Sellers	Brazil (BRA); Lars Grael; Clinio Freitas
Star	Great Britain (GBR); Michael McIntyre; Bryn Vaile	United States (USA); Mark Reynolds; Harold Haenel	Brazil (BRA); Torben Grael; Nelson Falcão
Soling	East Germany (GDR); Jochen Schümann; Thomas Flach; Bernd Jäkel	United States (USA); John Kostecki; William Baylis; Robert Billingham	Denmark (DEN); Jesper Bank; Jan Mathiasen; Steen Secher

== Shooting ==
=== Men's events ===
Events	Gold	Silver	Bronze
air pistol	Tanyu Kiryakov (BUL)	Erich Buljung (USA)	Xu Haifeng (CHN)
air rifle	Goran Maksimović (YUG)	Nicolas Berthelot (FRA)	Johann Riederer (FRG)
pistol	Sorin Babii (ROU)	Ragnar Skanåker (SWE)	Igor Basinski (URS)
rapid fire pistol	Afanasijs Kuzmins (URS)	Ralf Schumann (GDR)	Zoltán Kovács (HUN)
rifle three positions	Malcolm Cooper (GBR)	Alister Allan (GBR)	Kirill Ivanov (URS)
rifle prone	Miroslav Varga (TCH)	Cha Young-chul (KOR)	Attila Záhonyi (HUN)
running target	Tor Heiestad (NOR)	Huang Shiping (CHN)	Gennadi Avramenko (URS)

=== Women's events ===
Events	Gold	Silver	Bronze
air pistol	Jasna Šekarić (YUG)	Nino Salukvadze (URS)	Marina Dobrantcheva (URS)
air rifle	Irina Shilova (URS)	Silvia Sperber (FRG)	Anna Maloukhina (URS)
pistol	Nino Salukvadze (URS)	Tomoko Hasegawa (JPN)	Jasna Šekarić (YUG)
rifle three positions	Silvia Sperber (FRG)	Vesela Letcheva (BUL)	Valentina Cherkasova (URS)

=== Mixed events ===
Events	Gold	Silver	Bronze
Skeet	Axel Wegner (GDR)	Alfonso de Iruarrizaga (CHI)	Jorge Guardiola (ESP)
Trap	Dmitry Monakov (URS)	Miloslav Bednařík (TCH)	Frans Peeters (BEL)

== Swimming ==
=== Men's events ===
Event	Gold		Silver		Bronze	
50 m freestyle	Matt Biondi; United States	22.14 (WR)	Tom Jager; United States	22.36	Gennadiy Prigoda; Soviet Union	22.71
100 m freestyle	Matt Biondi; United States	48.63 ‘(OR)'	Chris Jacobs; United States	49.08	Stéphan Caron; France	49.62
200 m freestyle	Duncan Armstrong; Australia	1:47.25 (WR)	Anders Holmertz; Sweden	1:47.89	Matt Biondi; United States	1:47.99
400 m freestyle	Uwe Dassler; East Germany	3:46.95 (WR)	Duncan Armstrong; Australia	3:47.15	Artur Wojdat; Poland	3:47.34
1500 m freestyle	Vladimir Salnikov; Soviet Union	15:00.40	Stefan Pfeiffer; West Germany	15:02.69	Uwe Dassler; East Germany	15:06.15
100 m backstroke	Daichi Suzuki; Japan	55.05	David Berkoff; United States	55.18	Igor Polyansky; Soviet Union	55.20
200 m backstroke	Igor Polyansky; Soviet Union	1:59.37	Frank Baltrusch; East Germany	1:59.60	Paul Kingsman; New Zealand	2:00.48
100 m breaststroke	Adrian Moorhouse; Great Britain	1:02.04	Károly Güttler; Hungary	1:02.05	Dmitry Volkov; Soviet Union	1:02.20
200 m breaststroke	József Szabó; Hungary	2:13.52	Nick Gillingham; Great Britain	2:14.12	Sergio López Miró; Spain	2:15.21
100 m butterfly	Anthony Nesty; Suriname	53.00 (OR)	Matt Biondi; United States	53.01	Andy Jameson; Great Britain	53.30
200 m butterfly	Michael Gross; West Germany	1:56.94 (OR)	Benny Nielsen; Denmark	1:58.24	Anthony Mosse; New Zealand	1:58.28
200 m individual medley	Tamás Darnyi; Hungary	2:00.17 (WR)	Patrick Kühl; East Germany	2:01.61	Vadim Yaroshchuk; Soviet Union	2:02.40
400 m individual medley	Tamás Darnyi; Hungary	4:14.75 (WR)	David Wharton; United States	4:17.36	Stefano Battistelli; Italy	4:18.01
4 × 100 m freestyle relay	United States; Chris Jacobs; Troy Dalbey; Tom Jager; Matt Biondi; Doug Gjertsen*; Brent Lang*; Shaun Jordan*	3:16.53 (WR)	Soviet Union; Gennadiy Prigoda; Yuri Bashkatov; Nikolai Yevseyev; Vladimir Tkacenko; Raimundas Mažuolis*; Oleksiy Boryslavskiy*	3:18.33	East Germany; Dirk Richter; Thomas Flemming; Lars Hinneburg; Steffen Zesner	3:19.82
4 × 200 m freestyle relay	United States; Troy Dalbey; Matt Cetlinski; Doug Gjertsen; Matt Biondi; Craig Oppel*; Dan Jorgensen*	7:12.51 (WR)	East Germany; Uwe Daßler; Sven Lodziewski; Thomas Flemming; Steffen Zesner; Lars Hinneburg*	7:13.68	West Germany; Erik Hochstein; Thomas Fahrner; Rainer Henkel; Michael Gross; Peter Sitt*; Stefan Pfeiffer*	7:14.35
4 × 100 m medley relay	United States; David Berkoff; Richard Schroeder; Matt Biondi; Chris Jacobs; Jay Mortenson*; Tom Jager*	3:36.93	Canada; Mark Tewksbury; Victor Davis; Tom Ponting; Sandy Goss	3:39.28	Soviet Union; Igor Polyansky; Dmitry Volkov; Vadim Yaroshchuk; Gennadiy Prigoda; Sergey Zabolotnov*; Valeriy Lozik*; Konstantin Petrov*; Nikolay Yevseyev*	3:39.96

* Swimmers who participated in the heats only and received medals.

=== Women's events ===
Event	Gold		Silver		Bronze	
50 m freestyle	Kristin Otto; East Germany	25.49 (OR)	Yang Wenyi; China	25.64	Jill Sterkel; United States	25.71
50 m freestyle	Kristin Otto; East Germany	25.49 (OR)	Yang Wenyi; China	25.64	Katrin Meissner; East Germany	25.71
100 m freestyle	Kristin Otto; East Germany	54.93	Zhuang Yong; China	55.47	Catherine Plewinski; France	55.49
200 m freestyle	Heike Friedrich; East Germany	1:57.65 (OR)	Silvia Poll; Costa Rica	1:58.67	Manuela Stellmach; East Germany	1:59.01
400 m freestyle	Janet Evans; United States	4:03.85 (WR)	Heike Friedrich; East Germany	4:05.94	Anke Möhring; East Germany	4:06.62
800 m freestyle	Janet Evans; United States	8:20.20 (OR)	Astrid Strauß; East Germany	8:22.09	Julie McDonald; Australia	8:22.93
100 m backstroke	Kristin Otto; East Germany	1:00.89	Krisztina Egerszegi; Hungary	1:01.56	Cornelia Sirch; East Germany	1:01.57
200 m backstroke	Krisztina Egerszegi; Hungary	2:09.29 (OR)	Katrin Zimmermann; East Germany	2:10.61	Cornelia Sirch; East Germany	2:11.45
100 m breaststroke	Tanya Dangalakova; Bulgaria	1:07.95 (OR)	Antoaneta Frenkeva; Bulgaria	1:08.74	Silke Hörner; East Germany	1:08.83
200 m breaststroke	Silke Hörner; East Germany	2:26.71 (WR)	Huang Xiaomin; China	2:27.49	Antoaneta Frenkeva; Bulgaria	2:28.34
100 m butterfly	Kristin Otto; East Germany	59.00 (OR)	Birte Weigang; East Germany	59.45	Hong Qian; China	59.52
200 m butterfly	Kathleen Nord; East Germany	2:09.51	Birte Weigang; East Germany	2:09.91	Mary T. Meagher; United States	2:10.80
200 m individual medley	Daniela Hunger; East Germany	2:12.59 (OR)	Yelena Dendeberova; Soviet Union	2:13.31	Noemi Lung; Romania	2:14.85
400 m individual medley	Janet Evans; United States	4:37.76	Noemi Lung; Romania	4:39.46	Daniela Hunger; East Germany	4:39.76
4 × 100 m freestyle relay	East Germany; Kristin Otto; Katrin Meissner; Daniela Hunger; Manuela Stellmach; Sabina Schulze*; Heike Friedrich*	3:40.63	Netherlands; Marianne Muis; Mildred Muis; Conny van Bentum; Karin Brienesse; Diana van der Plaats*	3:43.39	United States; Mary Wayte; Mitzi Kremer; Laura Walker; Dara Torres; Paige Zemina*; Jill Sterkel*	3:44.25
4 × 100 m medley relay	East Germany; Kristin Otto; Silke Hörner; Birte Weigang; Katrin Meissner; Cornelia Sirch*; Manuela Stellmach*	4:03.74	United States; Beth Barr; Tracey McFarlane; Janel Jorgensen; Mary Wayte; Betsy Mitchell*; Mary T. Meagher*; Dara Torres*	4:07.90	Canada; Lori Melien; Allison Higson; Jane Kerr; Andrea Nugent; Keltie Duggan*; Patricia Noall*	4:10.49

* Swimmers who participated in the heats only and received medals.

== Synchronized swimming ==
Events	Gold	Silver	Bronze
Solo	Carolyn Waldo; Canada	Tracie Ruiz; United States	Mikako Kotani; Japan
Duet	Canada; Michelle Cameron; Carolyn Waldo	United States; Karen Josephson; Sarah Josephson	Japan; Mikako Kotani; Miyako Tanaka

== Table tennis ==
Events	Gold	Silver	Bronze
Men's singles	Yoo Nam-Kyu; South Korea	Kim Ki-Taik; South Korea	Erik Lindh; Sweden
Men's doubles	Chen Longcan and Wei Qingguang; China	Ilija Lupulesku and Zoran Primorac; Yugoslavia	Ahn Jae-Hyung and Yoo Nam-Kyu; South Korea
Women's singles	Chen Jing; China	Li Huifen; China	Jiao Zhimin; China
Women's doubles	Hyun Jung-Hwa and Yang Young-Ja; South Korea	Chen Jing and Jiao Zhimin; China	Jasna Fazlić and Gordana Perkučin; Yugoslavia

== Tennis ==
Events	Gold	Silver	Bronze
Men's Singles	Miloslav Mečíř; Czechoslovakia	Tim Mayotte; United States	Stefan Edberg; Sweden
Men's Singles	Miloslav Mečíř; Czechoslovakia	Tim Mayotte; United States	Brad Gilbert; United States
Men's Doubles	Ken Flach and Robert Seguso (USA)	Emilio Sánchez and Sergio Casal (ESP)	Miloslav Mečíř and Milan Šrejber (TCH)
Men's Doubles	Ken Flach and Robert Seguso (USA)	Emilio Sánchez and Sergio Casal (ESP)	Stefan Edberg and Anders Järryd (SWE)
Women's Singles	Steffi Graf; West Germany	Gabriela Sabatini; Argentina	Zina Garrison; United States
Women's Singles	Steffi Graf; West Germany	Gabriela Sabatini; Argentina	Manuela Maleeva; Bulgaria
Women's Doubles	Pam Shriver and Zina Garrison (USA)	Jana Novotná and Helena Suková (TCH)	Elizabeth Smylie and Wendy Turnbull (AUS)
Women's Doubles	Pam Shriver and Zina Garrison (USA)	Jana Novotná and Helena Suková (TCH)	Steffi Graf and Claudia Kohde-Kilsch (FRG)

== Volleyball ==
Events	Gold	Silver	Bronze
Men's indoor	United States; Troy Tanner; David Saunders; Jonathan Root; Robert Ctvrtlik; Robert Partie; Steve Timmons; Craig Buck; Scott Fortune; Ricci Luyties; Jeffrey Stork; Eric Sato; Karch Kiraly	Soviet Union; Yuri Panchenko; Andrei Kuznetsov; Viacheslav Zaitsev; Igor Runov; Vladimir Shkurikhin; Yevgeni Krasilnikov; Raimundas Vilde; Valeri Losev; Yuri Sapega; Oleksandr Sorokalet; Yaroslav Antonov; Yuri Cherednik	Argentina; Claudio Zulianello; Daniel Castellani; Esteban Martínez; Alejandro Diz; Daniel Colla; Carlos Weber; Hugo Conte; Waldo Kantor; Raul Quiroga; Jon Uriarte; Esteban de Palma; Juan Cuminetti
Women's indoor	Soviet Union; Valentina Ogiyenko; Yelena Volkova; Marina Kumysh; Irina Smirnova; Tatyana Sidorenko; Irina Parkhomchuk; Tatyana Kraynova; Olga Shkurnova; Marina Nikulina; Elena Ovchinnikova; Olga Krivosheyeva; Svetlana Korytova	Peru; Luisa Cervera; Alejandra de la Guerra; Denisse Fajardo; Miriam Gallardo; Rosa García; Sonia Heredia; Katherine Horny; Natalia Málaga; Gabriela Pérez del Solar; Cecilia Tait; Gina Torrealva; Cenaida Uribe	China; Li Guojun; Zhou Hong; Hou Yuzhu; Wang Yajun; Yang Xilan; Su Huijuan; Ying Jiang; Cui Yongmei; Yang Xiaojun; Zheng Meizhu; Wu Dan; Li Yueming

== Water polo ==
Games	Gold	Silver	Bronze
Men's	Yugoslavia; Dragan Andrić; Mislav Bezmalinović; Perica Bukić; Veselin Đuho; Igor Gočanin; Deni Lušić; Igor Milanović; Tomislav Paškvalin; Renco Posinković; Goran Rađenović; Dubravko Šimenc; Aleksandar Šoštar; Mirko Vičević	United States; James Bergeson; Greg Boyer; Peter Campbell; Jeff Campbell; Jody Campbell; Christopher Duplanty; Michael Evans; Douglas Kimbell; Edward Klass; Alan Mouchawar; Kevin Robertson; Terence Schroeder; Craig Wilson	Soviet Union; Dmitry Apanasenko; Viktor Berendyuga; Mikhail Giorgadze; Yevgeny Grishin; Mikhail Ivanov; Aleksandr Kolotov; Sergey Kotenko; Sergey Markoch; Nurlan Mendygaliev; Georgi Mschvenieradze; Sergey Naumov; Yevgeny Sharonov; Nikolai Smirnov

== Weightlifting ==
Events	Gold	Silver	Bronze
52 kg	Sevdalin Marinov (BUL)	Chun Byung-Kwan (KOR)	He Zhuoqiang (CHN)
56 kg	Oksen Mirzoyan (URS)	He Yingqiang (CHN)	Liu Shoubin (CHN)
60 kg	Naim Süleymanoğlu (TUR)	Stefan Topurov (BUL)	Ye Huanming (CHN)
67.5 kg	Joachim Kunz (GDR)	Israel Militosyan (URS)	Li Jinhe (CHN)
75 kg	Borislav Gidikov (BUL)	Ingo Steinhöfel (GDR)	Aleksandar Varbanov (BUL)
82.5 kg	Israil Arsamakov (URS)	István Messzi (HUN)	Lee Hyeong-Geun (KOR)
90 kg	Anatoly Khrapaty (URS)	Nail Mukhamedyarov (URS)	Sławomir Zawada (POL)
100 kg	Pavel Kuznetsov (URS)	Nicu Vlad (ROU)	Peter Immesberger (FRG)
110 kg	Yury Zakharevitch (URS)	József Jacsó (HUN)	Ronny Weller (GDR)
+110 kg	Aleksandr Kurlovich (URS)	Manfred Nerlinger (FRG)	Martin Zawieja (FRG)

Mitko Grablev (56 kg) and Angel Guenchev (67.5 kg) of Bulgaria originally won their respective weight classes, but were both disqualified after they tested positive for Furosemide. Andor Szanyi of Hungary was originally awarded silver in the 100 kg event, but was disqualified after he tested positive for Stanozolol.

== Wrestling ==
=== Freestyle ===
Events	Gold	Silver	Bronze
48 kg	Takashi Kobayashi; Japan	Ivan Tzonov; Bulgaria	Sergei Karamchakov; Soviet Union
52 kg	Mitsuru Sato; Japan	Šaban Trstena; Yugoslavia	Vladimir Toguzov; Soviet Union
57 kg	Sergei Beloglazov; Soviet Union	Askari Mohammadian; Iran	Noh Kyung-sun; South Korea
62 kg	John Smith; United States	Stepan Sarkisyan; Soviet Union	Simeon Shterev; Bulgaria
68 kg	Arsen Fadzaev; Soviet Union	Park Jang-soon; South Korea	Nate Carr; United States
74 kg	Kenny Monday; United States	Adlan Varayev; Soviet Union	Rahmat Sofiadi; Bulgaria
82 kg	Han Myung-woo; South Korea	Necmi Gençalp; Turkey	Jozef Lohyňa; Czechoslovakia
90 kg	Makharbek Khadartsev; Soviet Union	Akira Ota; Japan	Kim Tae-woo; South Korea
100 kg	Vasile Puşcaşu; Romania	Leri Khabelov; Soviet Union	William Scherr; United States
130 kg	David Gobejishvili; Soviet Union	Bruce Baumgartner; United States	Andreas Schröder; East Germany

=== Greco-Roman ===
Events	Gold	Silver	Bronze
48 kg	Vincenzo Maenza; Italy	Andrzej Głąb; Poland	Bratan Tzenov; Bulgaria
52 kg	Jon Rønningen; Norway	Atsuji Miyahara; Japan	Lee Jae-suk; South Korea
57 kg	András Sike; Hungary	Stoyan Balov; Bulgaria	Charalambos Cholidis; Greece
62 kg	Kamandar Madzhidov; Soviet Union	Zhivko Vangelov; Bulgaria	An Dae-hyun; South Korea
68 kg	Levon Julfalakyan; Soviet Union	Kim Sung-moon; South Korea	Tapio Sipilä; Finland
74 kg	Kim Young-nam; South Korea	Daulet Turlykhanov; Soviet Union	Józef Tracz; Poland
82 kg	Mikhail Mamiashvili; Soviet Union	Tibor Komáromi; Hungary	Kim Sang-kyu; South Korea
90 kg	Atanas Komchev; Bulgaria	Harri Koskela; Finland	Vladimir Popov; Soviet Union
100 kg	Andrzej Wroński; Poland	Gerhard Himmel; West Germany	Dennis Koslowski; United States
130 kg	Aleksandr Karelin; Soviet Union	Rangel Gerovski; Bulgaria	Tomas Johansson; Sweden

== See also ==
- 1988 Summer Olympics medal table
