= List of Olympic medalists in handball (women) =

These are the Olympic medalists in women's handball.

Games	Gold	Silver	Bronze
1976 Montreal	Soviet Union; Lyubov Odynokova; Lyudmila Bobrus; Aldona Česaitytė; Tetyana Hlushchenko; Larysa Karlova; Mariya Litoshenko; Nina Lobova; Tetyana Kocherhina; Lyudmyla Panchuk; Rafiga Shabanova; Nataliya Tymoshkina; Lyudmila Shubina; Zinaida Turchyna; Halyna Zakharova	East Germany; Gabriele Badorek; Hannelore Burosch; Roswitha Krause; Waltraud Kretzschmar; Evelyn Matz; Liane Michaelis; Eva Paskuy; Kristina Richter; Christina Rost; Silvia Siefert; Marion Tietz; Petra Uhlig; Christina Voß; Hannelore Zober	Hungary; Éva Angyal; Mária Berzsenyi; Ágota Bujdosó; Klára Csíkné; Zsuzsanna Kéziné; Katalin Lakiné; Rozália Lelkesné; Márta Megyeriné; Ilona Nagy; Marianna Nagy; Erzsébet Németh; Amália Sterbinszky; Borbála Tóth Harsányi; Mária Vadászné
1980 Moscow	Soviet Union; Larysa Karlova; Tetyana Kocherhina; Valentyna Lutayeva; Aldona Nenėnienė; Lyubov Odynokova; Iryna Palchykova; Lyudmila Poradnyk; Yuliya Safina; Larisa Savkina; Sigita Strečen; Nataliya Tymoshkina; Zinaida Turchyna; Olha Zubaryeva	Yugoslavia; Svetlana Anastasovska; Mirjana Đurica; Radmila Drljača; Katica Ileš; Slavica Jeremić; Svetlana Kitić; Jasna Kolar-Merdan; Vesna Milošević; Mirjana Ognjenović; Vesna Radović; Radmila Savić; Ana Titlić; Biserka Višnjić; Zorica Vojinović	East Germany; Birgit Heinecke; Roswitha Krause; Waltraud Kretzschmar; Katrin Krüger; Kornelia Kunisch; Evelyn Matz; Kristina Richter; Christina Rost; Sabine Röther; Renate Rudolph; Marion Tietz; Petra Uhlig; Claudia Wunderlich; Hannelore Zober
1984 Los Angeles	Yugoslavia; Svetlana Anastasovska; Alenka Cuderman; Svetlana Dašić-Kitić; Slavica Đukić; Dragica Đurić; Mirjana Đurica; Emilija Erčić; Ljubinka Janković; Jasna Kolar-Merdan; Ljiljana Mugoša; Svetlana Mugoša-Antić; Mirjana Ognjenović; Zorica Pavićević; Jasna Ptujec; Biserka Višnjić	South Korea; Han Hwa-soo; Jeong Hyoi-soon; Jeung Soon-bok; Kim Choon-rye; Kim Kyung-soon; Kim Mi-sook; Kim Ok-hwa; Lee Soon-ei; Lee Young-ja; Son Mi-na; Sung Kyung-hwa; Yoon Byung-soon; Yoon Soo-kyung	China; Chen Zhen; Gao Xiumin; He Jianping; Li Lan; Liu Liping; Liu Yumei; Sun Xiulan; Wang Linwei; Wang Mingxing; Wu Xingjiang; Zhang Weihong; Zhang Peijun; Zhu Juefeng
1988 Seoul	South Korea; Han Hyun-sook; Kim Mi-sook; Kim Choon-rye; Kim Hyun-mee; Kim Kyung-soon; Kim Myung-soon; Lee Ki-soon; Lim Mi-kyung; Son Mi-na; Song Ji-hyun; Suk Min-hee; Sung Kyung-hwa; Lee Mi-young	Norway; Kjerstin Andersen; Berit Digre; Marthe Eliasson; Susann Goksør; Trine Haltvik; Hanne Hegh; Hanne Hogness; Vibeke Johnsen; Kristin Midthun; Karin Pettersen; Karin Singstad; Annette Skotvoll; Ingrid Steen; Heidi Sundal; Cathrine Svendsen	Soviet Union; Natalya Anisimova; Maryna Bazanova; Tatyana Dzhandzhgava; Elina Guseva; Tetyana Horb; Larysa Karlova; Natalya Lapitskaya; Svitlana Mankova; Nataliya Matryuk; Natalya Morskova; Olena Nemashkalo; Nataliya Rusnachenko; Olha Semenova; Yevheniya Tovstohan; Zinaida Turchyna
1992 Barcelona	South Korea; Cha Jae-kyung; Han Hyun-sook; Han Sun-hee; Hong Jeong-ho; Jang Ri-ra; Kim Hwa-sook; Lee Ho-youn; Lee Mi-young; Lim O-kyeong; Min Hye-sook; Moon Hyang-ja; Nam Eun-young; Oh Seong-ok; Park Jeong-lim; Park Kap-sook	Norway; Hege Kirsti Frøseth; Tonje Sagstuen; Hanne Hogness; Heidi Sundal; Susann Goksør; Cathrine Svendsen; Mona Dahle; Siri Eftedal; Henriette Henriksen; Ingrid Steen; Karin Pettersen; Annette Skotvoll; Kristine Duvholt; Heidi Tjugum	Unified Team; Natalya Anisimova; Maryna Bazanova; Svetlana Bogdanova; Galina Borzenkova; Natalya Deryugina; Tatyana Dzhandzhgava; Lyudmila Gudz; Elina Guseva; Tetyana Horb; Larisa Kiselyova; Natalya Morskova; Galina Onoprienko; Svetlana Pryakhina
1996 Atlanta	Denmark; Anja Andersen; Camilla Andersen; Kristine Andersen; Heidi Astrup; Tina Bøttzau; Marianne Florman; Conny Hamann; Anja Hansen; Anette Hoffmann; Tonje Kjærgaard; Janne Kolling; Susanne Lauritsen; Gitte Madsen; Lene Rantala; Gitte Sunesen; Anne Dorthe Tanderup	South Korea; Cho Eun-hee; Han Sun-hee; Hong Jeong-ho; Huh Soon-young; Kim Cheong-sim; Kim Eun-mi; Kim Jeong-mi; Kim Mi-sim; Kim Rang; Kwag Hye-jeong; Lee Sang-eun; Lim O-kyeong; Moon Hyang-ja; Oh Seong-ok; Oh Yong-ran; Park Jeong-lim	Hungary; Éva Erdős; Andrea Farkas; Beáta Hoffmann; Anikó Kántor; Erzsébet Kocsis; Beatrix Kökény; Eszter Mátéfi; Auguszta Mátyás; Anikó Meksz; Anikó Nagy; Helga Németh; Ildikó Pádár; Beáta Siti; Anna Szántó; Katalin Szilágyi; Beatrix Tóth
2000 Sydney	Denmark; Lene Rantala; Camilla Andersen; Tina Bøttzau; Janne Kolling; Tonje Kjærgaard; Karen Brødsgaard; Katrine Fruelund; Maja Grønbæk; Christina Hansen; Anette Hoffmann; Lotte Kiærskou; Karin Mortensen; Anja Nielsen; Rikke Petersen; Mette Vestergaard	Hungary; Beatrix Balogh; Rita Deli; Ágnes Farkas; Andrea Farkas; Anikó Kántor; Beatrix Kökény; Anita Kulcsár; Dóra Lőwy; Anikó Nagy; Ildikó Pádár; Katalin Pálinger; Krisztina Pigniczki; Bojana Radulovics; Judith Simics; Beáta Siti	Norway; Kristine Duvholt; Trine Haltvik; Heidi Tjugum; Susann Goksør Bjerkrheim; Ann Cathrin Eriksen; Kjersti Grini; Elisabeth Hilmo; Mia Hundvin; Tonje Larsen; Cecilie Leganger; Jeanette Nilsen; Marianne Rokne; Birgitte Sættem; Monica Sandve; Else-Marthe Sørlie
2004 Athens	Denmark; Louise Nørgaard; Rikke Skov; Henriette Mikkelsen; Mette Vestergaard; Rikke Jørgensen; Camilla Thomsen; Karin Mortensen; Lotte Kiærskou; Trine Jensen; Katrine Fruelund; Rikke Schmidt; Kristine Andersen; Karen Brødsgaard; Line Daugaard; Josephine Touray	South Korea; Oh Yong-ran; Woo Sun-hee; Huh Soon-young; Lee Gong-joo; Jang So-hee; Kim Hyun-ok; Kim Cha-youn; Oh Seong-ok; Huh Young-sook; Moon Kyeong-ha; Lim O-kyeong; Lee Sang-eun; Myoung Bok-hee; Choi Im-jeong; Moon Pil-hee	Ukraine; Nataliya Borysenko; Ganna Burmystrova; Tetyana Shynkarenko; Maryna Vergelyuk; Olena Yatsenko; Ganna Siukalo; Olena Radchenko; Olena Tsyhytsia; Galyna Markushevska; Lyudmyla Shevchenko; Iryna Honcharova; Nataliya Lyapina; Anastasiia Pidpalova; Larysa Zaspa; Oxana Rayhel
2008 Beijing	Norway; Ragnhild Aamodt; Karoline Dyhre Breivang; Marit Malm Frafjord; Gro Hammerseng; Katrine Lunde Haraldsen; Kari Aalvik Grimsbø; Kari Mette Johansen; Tonje Larsen; Kristine Lunde; Else-Marthe Sørlie Lybekk; Tonje Nøstvold; Katja Nyberg; Linn-Kristin Riegelhuth; Gøril Snorroeggen	Russia; Yekaterina Andryushina; Irina Bliznova; Yelena Dmitriyeva; Anna Kareyeva; Yekaterina Marennikova; Yelena Polenova; Irina Poltoratskaya; Lyudmila Postnova; Oxana Romenskaya; Natalia Shipilova; Maria Sidorova; Inna Suslina; Emiliya Turey; Yana Uskova	South Korea; An Jung-hwa; Bae Min-hee; Choi Im-jeong; Hong Jeong-ho; Huh Soon-young; Kim Cha-youn; Kim Nam-sun; Kim On-a; Lee Min-hee; Moon Pil-hee; Oh Seong-ok; Oh Yong-ran; Park Chung-hee; Song Hai-rim
2012 London	Norway; Kari Aalvik Grimsbø; Karoline Næss; Ida Alstad; Heidi Løke; Tonje Nøstvold; Karoline Dyhre Breivang; Kristine Lunde-Borgersen; Kari Mette Johansen; Marit Malm Frafjord; Linn Jørum Sulland; Katrine Lunde Haraldsen; Linn-Kristin Riegelhuth Koren; Gøril Snorroeggen; Amanda Kurtović; Camilla Herrem	Montenegro; Marina Vukčević; Radmila Miljanić; Jovanka Radičević; Ana Đokić; Marija Jovanović; Ana Radović; Anđela Bulatović; Sonja Barjaktarović; Maja Savić; Bojana Popović; Jasna Tošković; Suzana Lazović; Katarina Bulatović; Majda Mehmedović; Milena Knežević	Spain; Andrea Barnó; Carmen Martín; Nely Carla Alberto; Beatriz Fernández; Verónica Cuadrado; Marta Mangué; Macarena Aguilar; Silvia Navarro; Jessica Alonso; Elisabet Chávez; Elisabeth Pinedo; Begoña Fernández; Vanessa Amorós; Patricia Elorza; Mihaela Ciobanu
2016 Rio de Janeiro	Russia; Anna Sedoykina; Polina Kuznetsova; Daria Dmitrieva; Anna Sen; Olga Akopyan; Anna Vyakhireva; Marina Sudakova; Vladlena Bobrovnikova; Victoria Zhilinskayte; Yekaterina Marennikova; Irina Bliznova; Yekaterina Ilyina; Maya Petrova; Tatiana Erokhina; Victoriya Kalinina	France; Laura Glauser; Blandine Dancette; Camille Ayglon; Allison Pineau; Laurisa Landre; Grace Zaadi; Marie Prouvensier; Amandine Leynaud; Manon Houette; Siraba Dembélé; Chloé Bulleux; Béatrice Edwige; Estelle Nze Minko; Gnonsiane Niombla; Alexandra Lacrabère	Norway; Kari Aalvik Grimsbø; Mari Molid; Emilie Hegh Arntzen; Ida Alstad; Veronica Kristiansen; Heidi Løke; Nora Mørk; Stine Bredal Oftedal; Marit Malm Frafjord; Katrine Lunde; Linn-Kristin Riegelhuth Koren; Amanda Kurtović; Camilla Herrem; Sanna Solberg
2020 Tokyo	France; Méline Nocandy; Blandine Dancette; Pauline Coatanea; Chloé Valentini; Allison Pineau; Coralie Lassource; Grâce Zaadi Deuna; Amandine Leynaud; Kalidiatou Niakaté; Cléopatre Darleux; Océane Sercien-Ugolin; Laura Flippes; Béatrice Edwige; Pauletta Foppa; Estelle Nze Minko; Alexandra Lacrabère	ROC (ROC); Anna Sedoykina; Polina Kuznetsova; Polina Gorshkova; Daria Dmitrieva; Anna Sen; Anna Vyakhireva; Polina Vedekhina; Vladlena Bobrovnikova; Kseniya Makeyeva; Elena Mikhaylichenko; Olga Fomina; Ekaterina Ilina; Yulia Managarova; Antonina Skorobogatchenko; Victoriya Kalinina	Norway; Henny Reistad; Veronica Kristiansen; Marit Malm Frafjord; Stine Skogrand; Nora Mørk; Stine Bredal Oftedal; Silje Solberg; Kari Brattset Dale; Katrine Lunde; Marit Røsberg Jacobsen; Camilla Herrem; Sanna Solberg-Isaksen; Kristine Breistøl; Marta Tomac; Vilde Johansen
2024 Paris	Norway; Veronica Kristiansen; Maren Nyland Aardahl; Stine Skogrand; Nora Mørk; Stine Bredal Oftedal; Silje Solberg-Østhassel; Kari Brattset Dale; Kristine Breistøl; Vilde Ingstad; Katrine Lunde; Marit Røsberg Jacobsen; Camilla Herrem; Sanna Solberg-Isaksen; Henny Reistad; Thale Rushfeldt Deila	France; Laura Glauser; Méline Nocandy; Alicia Toublanc; Chloé Valentini; Coralie Lassource; Grâce Zaadi; Cléopatre Darleux; Laura Flippes; Orlane Kanor; Tamara Horacek; Pauletta Foppa; Estelle Nze Minko; Oriane Ondono; Lucie Granier; Sarah Bouktit; Léna Grandveau; Hatadou Sako	Denmark; Sandra Toft; Sarah Iversen; Helena Elver; Anne Mette Hansen; Kathrine Heindahl; Line Haugsted; Althea Reinhardt; Mette Tranborg; Kristina Jørgensen; Trine Østergaard; Louise Burgaard; Mie Højlund; Emma Friis; Rikke Iversen; Michala Møller
2028 Los Angeles			

|}
