= Norway at the 1988 Summer Olympics =

- IOC code: NOR
- NOC: Norwegian Olympic Committee

in Seoul, South Korea 17 September-2 October
- Competitors: 69 (44 men and 25 women) in 11 sports
- Flag bearer: Grete Waitz (athletics)
- Medals Ranked 21st: Gold 2 Silver 3 Bronze 0 Total 5

Summer Olympics appearances (overview)
- 1900; 1904; 1908; 1912; 1920; 1924; 1928; 1932; 1936; 1948; 1952; 1956; 1960; 1964; 1968; 1972; 1976; 1980; 1984; 1988; 1992; 1996; 2000; 2004; 2008; 2012; 2016; 2020; 2024

Other related appearances
- 1906 Intercalated Games

Norway competed at the 1988 Summer Olympics in Seoul. 69 competitors, 44 men and 25 women, took part in 42 events in 11 sports.

Two days before the opening ceremony, Lillehammer was awarded the right to host the 1994 Winter Olympics.

== Medalists ==
Medal	Name	Sport	Event	Date
Gold	Jon Rønningen	Wrestling	Men's Greco-Roman 52 kg	21 September
Gold	Tor Heiestad	Shooting	Men's 50 metre running target	23 September
Silver	Lars Bjønness; Alf Hansen; Rolf Thorsen; Vetle Vinje	Rowing	Men's quadruple sculls	25 September
Silver	Erik Bjørkum; Ole Petter Pollen	Sailing	Flying Dutchman	27 September
Silver	Norway women's national handball team: Vibeke Johnsen; Cathrine Svendsen; Heidi Sundal; Hanne Hegh; Hanne Hogness; Karin Singstad; Trine Haltvik; Berit Digre; Ingrid Steen; Karin Pettersen; Annette Skotvoll; Kristin Midthun; Marte Eliasson; Kjerstin Andersen	Handball	Women's tournament	29 September

== Competitors ==
The following is the list of number of competitors in the Games.

Sport	Men	Women	Total
Athletics	7	5	12
Canoeing	7	0	7
Cycling	3	2	5
Diving	0	1	1
Equestrian	1	0	1
Handball	0	14	14
Rowing	9	0	9
Sailing	7	0	7
Shooting	4	2	6
Swimming	1	1	2
Wrestling	5	–	5
Total	44	25	69

== Athletics ==
Men's 5000 metres

- Lars Ove Strømø

- Heat — did not finish (→ no ranking)

Men's 10,000 metres

- John Halvorsen

- Heat — 28:22.25
- Final — 28:29.21 (→ 16th place)

Women's 10,000 metres

- Ingrid Kristiansen

- Heat — Ingrid Kristiansen
- Final — did not finish (→ no ranking)

Men's Marathon

- Geir Kvernmo — did not finish (→ no ranking)

Women's Marathon

- Sissel Grottenberg — 2"38:17 (→ 36th place)
- Grete Waitz — did not finish (→ no ranking)
- Bente Moe — did not start (→ no ranking)

Men's Shot Put

- Georg Andersen

- Qualification — 20.05 metres (advanced to the final)
- Final — 19.91 metres (→ 10th place)

Men's Discus Throw

- Knut Hjeltnes

- Qualification — 63.50 metres
- Final — 64.94 metres (→ 7th place)

- Svein Inge Valvik

- Qualification — 60.64 metres (→ did not advance)

Women's Javelin Throw

- Trine Hattestad — Final, 58.82 metres (18th place)

Men's 20km Walk

- Erling Andersen — 1:23:30 (→ 22nd place)

Men's 50km Walk

- Erling Andersen — did not finish (→ no ranking)

== Cycling ==
Five cyclists, three men and two women, represented Norway in 1988.

Men's road race

- Atle Pedersen
- Erik Johan Sæbø
- Geir Dahlen

Women's road race

- Unni Larsen — 2:00:52 (→ 20th place)
- Astrid Danielsen — 2:00:52 (→ 35th place)

== Diving ==
Women

Athlete	Event	Preliminary		Final	
Athlete	Event	Points	Rank	Points	Rank
Kamilla Gamme	3 m springboard	DNS		Did not advance	
Kamilla Gamme	10 m platform	356.73	11 Q	366.45	7

== Swimming ==
Men's 100m Breaststroke

- Jan-Erick Olsen

- Heat — 1:05.54 (→ did not advance, 38th place)

Men's 200m Breaststroke

- Jan-Erick Olsen

- Heat — 2:26.70 (→ did not advance, 41st place)

Women's 400m Freestyle

- Irene Dalby

- Heat — 4:16.22 (→ did not advance, 17th place)

Women's 800m Freestyle

- Irene Dalby

- Heat — 8:38.33 (→ did not advance, 10th place)

Women's 400m Individual Medley

- Irene Dalby

- Heat — 4:58.14 (→ did not advance, 22nd place)

== Wrestling ==
Men's Greco-Roman Light-Flyweight

- Lars Rønningen

Men's Greco-Roman Flyweight

- Jon Rønningen

Men's Greco-Roman Bantamweight

- Ronny Sigde

Men's Greco-Roman Lightweight

- Morten Brekke

Men's Greco-Roman Middleweight

- Stig Kleven
