= Natalya Anisimova =

Natalya Anisimova may refer to:

- Natalya Anisimova (sprinter) (born 1973), Russian athlete who competed mainly in the 100 metres
- Natalya Anisimova (handballer) (born 1960), Russian handball player
