= Svetlana Anastasovska =

Macedonian handball player (born 1961)

Olympic medal record

Women's Handball

Representing Yugoslavia

Olympic Games
Gold medal – first place	1984 Los Angeles	Team
Silver medal – second place	1980 Moscow	Team

World Championships
Bronze medal – third place	1982 Hungary	Team

Svetlana Anastasovska-Obućina (née Anastasovska, Serbian Cyrillic: Светлана Анастасовска-Обућина, born April 26, 1961, in Belgrade) is a former handball player who competed in the 1980 Summer Olympics, in the 1984 Summer Olympics and in the 1988 Summer Olympics.

In 1980 she won the silver medal with the Yugoslav team. She played all five matches and scored twelve goals.

Four years later she won the gold medal as member of the Yugoslav team. She played all five matches and scored 13 goals.

In 1988 she was part of the Yugoslav team which finished fourth in the Olympic tournament. She played one match.
