= Yuri Shevtsov =

Belarusian handball player

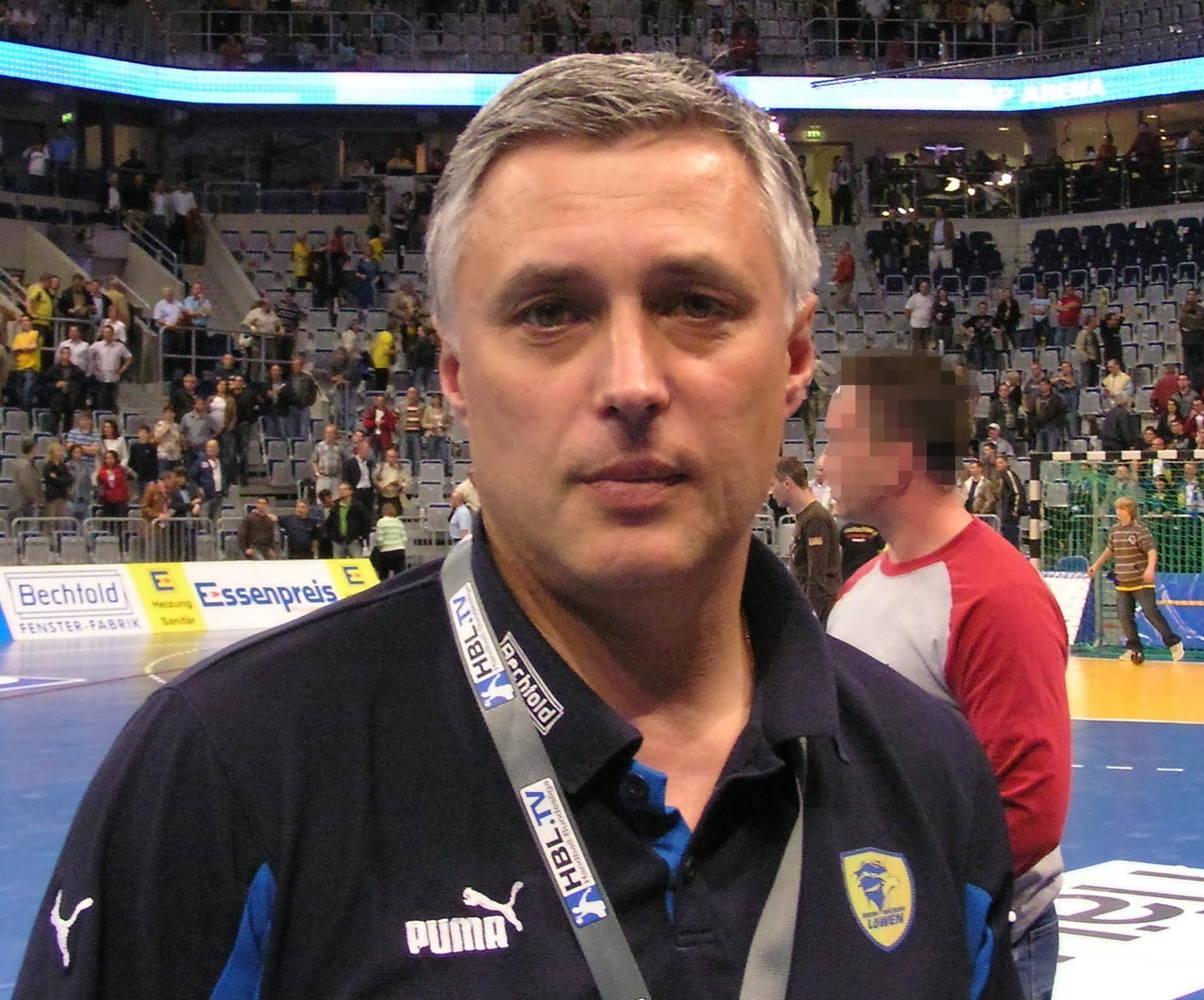
- Shevtsov in 2007

Personal information
- Full name: Yuri Anatolyevich Shevtsov
- Born: 16 December 1959 (age 66) Slutsk, USSR
- Height: 180 cm (71 in)

Sport
- Sport: Handball
- Position: Right wing

Youth career
- Years: Team
- -1974: Slutsk
- 1974-1978: SKA Minsk

Senior clubs
- Years: Team
- 1978-1992: SKA Minsk
- 1990-1994: SV Blau-Weiß Spandau
National team
Years	Team	Apps
–	Soviet Union	250

Teams managed
- 1993-1996: SV Blau-Weiß Spandau
- 1996-2001: TBV Lemgo
- 2001-2005: TUSEM Essen
- 2005-2009: Rhein-Neckar Löwen
- 2009-: Belarus
Medal record
Representing Soviet Union
Olympic Games
Gold medal – first place	1988 Seoul	Team
World Championships
Gold medal – first place	1982 West Germany	Team

Yuri Anatolyevich Shevtsov (Belarusian: Юрый Анатольевіч Шаўцоў; Russian: Юрий Анатольевич Шевцов, born 16 December 1959 in Minsk, Belarus) is a Belarusian former handball player and current coach. Since 2009 he has been the head coach of the Belarusian national team.

He represented the Soviet Union in the 1988 Summer Olympics where he won the gold medal with the Soviet team. He played five matches including the final and scored 18 goals. He also won gold medals at the 1982 World Championship.

== Career ==
=== Playing career ===
At the age of 14 he transferred from his hometown club in Slutsk to local top team SKA Minsk. Here he played 18 years and won both the Soviet Championship many times as well as the European Cup in 1987 1989 and 1990. He also won the EHF Cup Winners' Cup in 1983 and 1988.

After the fall of the Berlin Wall he joined German side SV Blau-Weiß Spandau. He retired from playing in 1992 and became the head coach of SV Blau-Weiß Spandau instead.

=== Coaching career ===
In 1996 he joined TBV Lemgo, where he won the Handball-Bundesliga, DHB-Supercup and DHB-Pokal in hs first season. He also won the Supercup in 1999, after he had reached the final of the DHB-Pokal and lost to THW Kiel.

In 2001 he joined TUSEM Essen. In the 4 years he was at the club, his best placed finish was a 4th place in the 2002-03 season. The same season he reached the final of the DHB-Pokal, where they lost to SG Flensburg-Handewitt.

in 2005 he joined the 2nd Bundesliga team SG Kronau/Östringen on a 4 year contract. He guided the team to the DHB-Pokal final in 2006 and 2007. in 2008 he achieved a 4th place, the highest position ever for the club. They also reached the final of the EHF Cup Winners' Cup, where they lost to MKB Veszprém.

After a bad start to 2008-09 season he was fired and replaced by Christian Schwarzer.

==== Belarus ====
In July 2009 he became the head coach of the Belarusian national team replacing Georgi Sviridenko. He has guided the team at 4 World Championships, in 2013, 2015, 2017 and 2021. The best results has been in 2013 and 2017, where they both reached the round of 16.

In light of the launching of the 2022 Russian invasion of Ukraine, the European Handball Federation in February 2022 decided to suspend Belarus both in competitions for national teams and on the club level, meaning that he has only managed in friendlies since then.

== Titles ==
=== As player ===
- 1982 World Champion
- 1988 Olympic Champion
- EHF Champions League: 1987, 1989, 1990
- EHF Cup Winners' Cup: 1983, 1988
- Soviet Men's Handball Championship: 1981, 1984, 1985, 1986, 1988, 1989
- Soviet Men's Handball Cup: 1980, 1981, 1982, 1987

=== As coach ===
- German Championship: 1997
- DHB-Pokal: 1997
- DHB-Supercup: 1997, 1999
- EHF Cup: 2005
