= Mirjana Đurica =

Serbian handball player (born 1961)

Olympic medal record

Women's Handball
Gold medal – first place	1984 Los Angeles	Team
Silver medal – second place	1980 Moscow	Team

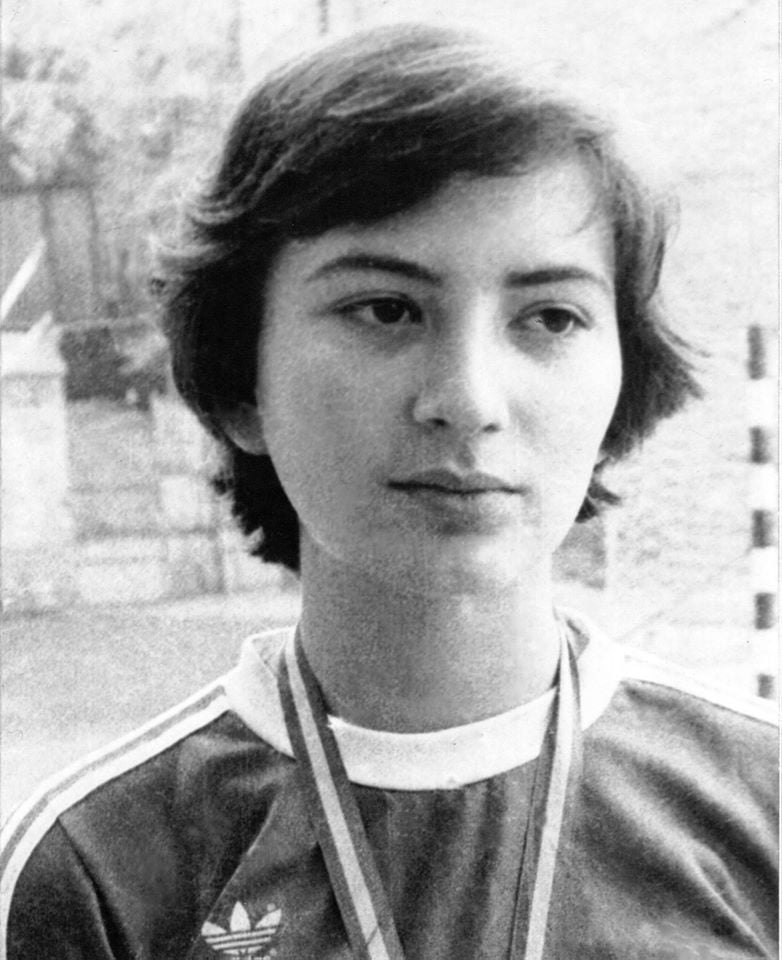
Mirjana Đurica

Mirjana Đurica (Serbian Cyrillic: Мирјана Ђурица, born 11 March 1961 in Sombor, Serbia, FPR Yugoslavia) is a former Yugoslav/Serbian handball player who competed in the 1980 Summer Olympics, in the 1984 Summer Olympics and in the 1988 Summer Olympics.

In 1980 she won the silver medal with the Yugoslav team. She played all five matches and scored one goal.

Four years later she won the gold medal as member of the Yugoslav team. She played all five matches and scored 18 goals.

In 1988 she was part of the Yugoslav team which finished fourth in the Olympic tournament. She played five matches and scored two goals.
