= Shim Jae-hong =

South Korean handball player (born 1968)

- Hangul: 심재홍
- RR: Sim Jaehong
- MR: Sim Chaehong

Olympic medal record

Men's Handball
Silver medal – second place	1988 Seoul	Team

Shim Jae-Hong (Korean: 심재홍; born August 28, 1968) is a male South Korean former handball player who competed in the 1988 Summer Olympics and in the 1992 Summer Olympics.

In 1988 he was a member of the South Korean team which won the silver medal in the Olympic tournament. He played five matches and scored four goals.

Four years later he finished sixth with the South Korean team in the 1992 Olympic tournament. He played five matches again and scored six goals.
