= Oh Young-ki =

South Korean handball player (born 1965)

Olympic medal record

Men's Handball
Silver medal – second place	1988 Seoul	Team

- Oh Young-ki
- Hangul: 오용기
- Hanja: 吳勇基
- RR: O Yonggi
- MR: O Yonggi

Oh Young-Ki (born November 11, 1965) is a male South Korean former handball player who competed in the 1988 Summer Olympics.

In 1988 he won the silver medal with the South Korean team. He played all six matches and scored two goals.
