= Mirjana Ognjenović =

Croatian handball player (born 1953)

Olympic medal record

Women's Handball
Gold medal – first place	1984 Los Angeles	Team
Silver medal – second place	1980 Moscow	Team

Mirjana Ognjenović (born 17 September 1953, in Zagreb) is a former Yugoslav/Croatian handball player who competed in the 1980 Summer Olympics and in the 1984 Summer Olympics.

In 1980 she won the silver medal with the Yugoslav team. She played all five matches and scored eleven goals.

Four years later she won the gold medal as member of the Yugoslav team. She played four matches including the final and scored ten goals.
