= Boris Jarak =

Croatian handball player (born 1963)

Personal information
- Full name: Boris Jarak
- Nationality: Croatian
- Born: 19 April 1963 (age 63) Dubrovnik, SFR Yugoslavia
- Height: 190 cm (75 in)

Sport
- Sport: Handball
- Position: Left wing

Youth career
- Years: Team
- 1977-1979: RKHM Dubrovnik

Senior clubs
- Years: Team
- 1979-1982: RKHM Dubrovnik
- 1982-1990: Medveščak Infosistem
- 1990-1994: TV Eitra
- 1994-1996: Badel 1862 Zagreb
- 1996-1998: RK Medveščak
National team
Years	Team		
1982-1984	Yugoslavia U-21		
1987-1990	Yugoslavia	49	(68)
1995-1996	Croatia	12	

Teams managed
- 2001-2003: HRK Izviđač
Medal record
Representing Yugoslavia
Men's Handball
Bronze medal – third place	1988 Seoul	Team
Representing Croatia
World Championships
Silver medal – second place	1995 Iceland	Team

Boris Jarak (born 19 April 1963) is a former Yugoslav/Croatian handball player and coach.

Jarak made 49 appearances for the Yugoslavia national team, winning a bronze medal at the 1988 Summer Olympics. He also played 12 matches for the Croatia national team, winning a silver medal at the 1995 World Championship.

== Honours ==
Dubrovnik

- Croatian regional league - (South) (1): 1980-81

Medveščak

- Yugoslav Cup (4): 1986, 1987, 1989, 1990

Zagreb

- Croatian First A League (2): 1994–95, 1995–96
- Croatian Cup (2): 1995, 1996
