= Ermin Velić =

Bosnian handball player (born 1959)

Olympic medal record

Representing Yugoslavia

Olympic Games
| Bronze medal – third place | 1988 Seoul | |

World Championship
| Silver medal – second place | 1982 West Germany | |

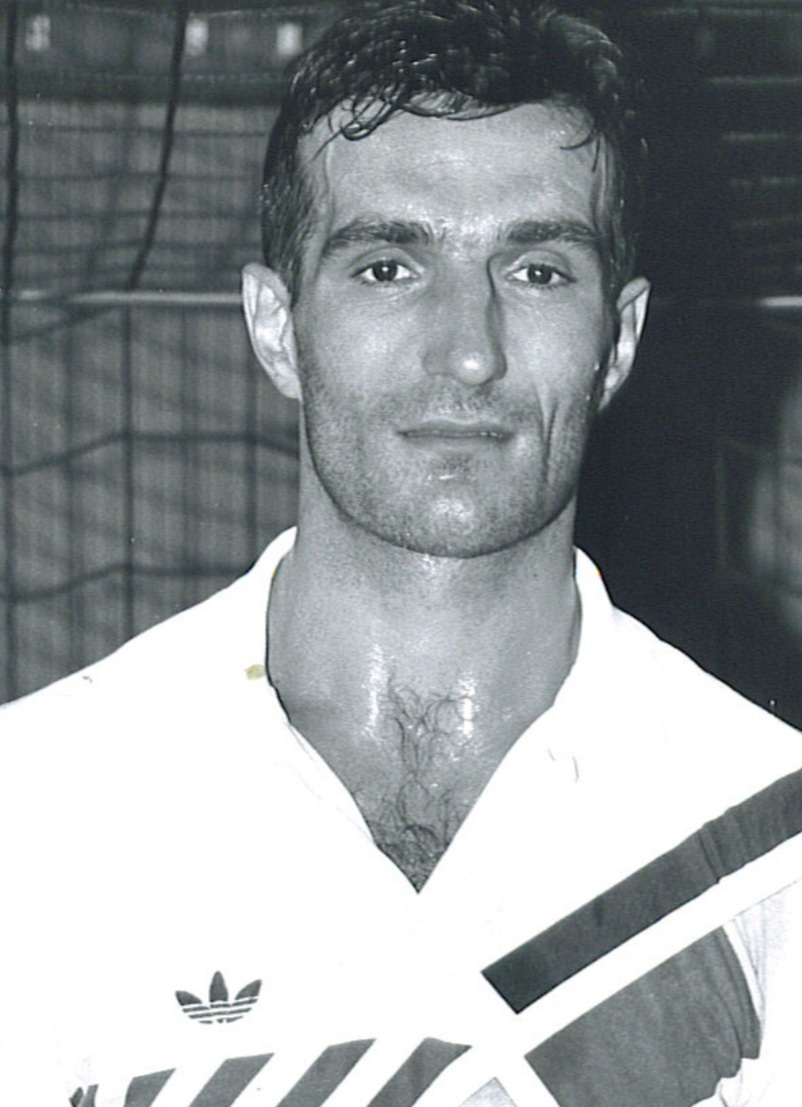
Ermin Velić

Ermin Velić (born April 1, 1959 in Jajce) is a Bosnian former handball player who won bronze medal for Yugoslavia in the 1988 Summer Olympics.
