= Handball at the 1988 Summer Olympics =

Tournament details
- Host country: South Korea
- Venue(s): Olympic Gymnastics Arena; Suwon Gymnasium
- Dates: 20 September – 1 October 1988
- Teams: 20

Final positions
- Champions: Soviet Union (men); South Korea (women)
- Runners-up: South Korea (men); Norway (women)
- Third place: Yugoslavia (men); Soviet Union (women)
- Fourth place: Hungary (men); Yugoslavia (women)

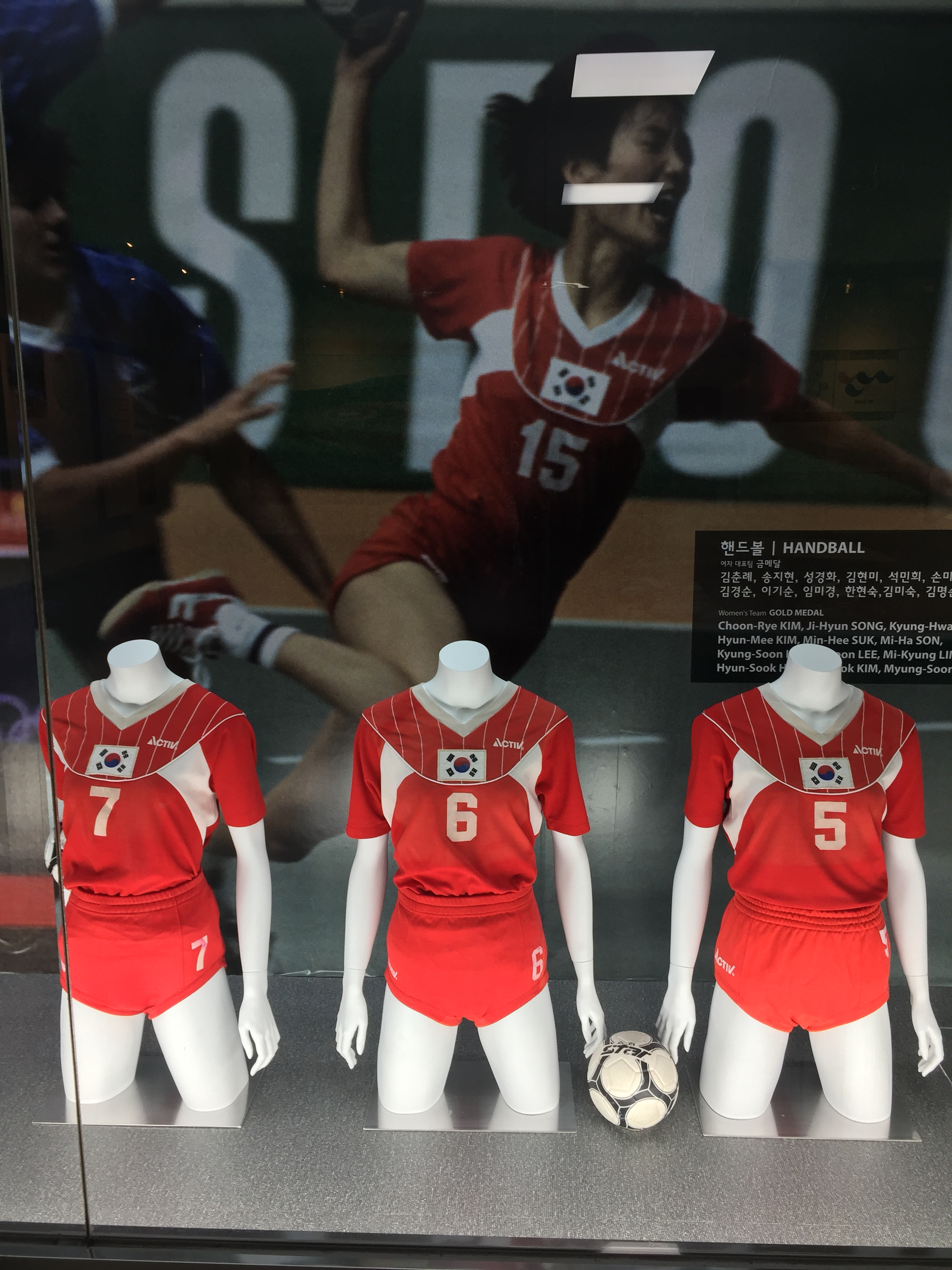
Korean handball players' uniforms at the 1988 Olympics

Final results for the handball competition at the 1988 Summer Olympics.

== Medal summary ==
=== Medal table ===
* Host nation (South Korea)

Rank	Nation	Gold	Silver	Bronze	Total
1	South Korea*	1	1	0	2
2	Soviet Union	1	0	1	2
3	Norway	0	1	0	1
4	Yugoslavia	0	0	1	1
Totals (4 entries)		2	2	2	6

=== Medalists ===
Event	Gold	Silver	Bronze
Men	Soviet Union Vyacheslav Atavin; Igor Chumak; Valeri Gopin; Aleksandr Karshakevich; Andrey Lavrov; Yuri Nesterov; Voldemaras Novickis; Aleksandr Rymanov; Konstantin Sharovarov; Yuri Shevtsov; Georgi Sviridenko; Aleksandr Tuchkin; Andrey Tyumentsev; Mikhail Vasilev; Leonid Doroshenko	South Korea Choi Suk-jae; Kang Jae-won; Kim Jae-hwan; Koh Suk-chang; Lee Sang-hyo; Lim Jin-suk; Noh Hyun-suk; Oh Young-ki; Park Do-hun; Park Young-dae; Shim Jae-hong; Shin Young-suk; Yoon Tae-il	Yugoslavia Mirko Bašić; Jožef Holpert; Boris Jarak; Slobodan Kuzmanovski; Muhamed Memić; Alvaro Načinović; Goran Perkovac; Zlatko Portner; Iztok Puc; Rolando Pušnik; Momir Rnić; Zlatko Saračević; Irfan Smajlagić; Ermin Velić; Veselin Vujović
Women	South Korea Han Hyun-sook; Ki Mi-sook; Kim Choon-rye; Kim Hyun-mee; Kim Kyung-soon; Kim Myung-soon; Lee Ki-soon; Lim Mi-kyung; Shon Mi-Na; Song Ji-hyun; Suk Min-hee; Sung Kyung-hwa; Lee Mi-young	Norway Kjerstin Andersen; Berit Digre; Marte Eliasson; Susann Goksør; Trine Haltvik; Hanne Hegh; Hanne Hogness; Vibeke Johnsen; Kristin Midthun; Karin Pettersen; Karin Singstad; Annette Skotvoll; Ingrid Steen; Heidi Sundal; Cathrine Svendsen	Soviet Union Natalya Anisimova; Maryna Bazhanova; Tatyana Dzhandzhgava; Elina Guseva; Tetyana Horb; Larysa Karlova; Natalya Lapitskaya; Svitlana Mankova; Nataliya Matryuk; Natalya Morskova; Olena Nemashkalo; Nataliya Rusnachenko; Olha Semenova; Yevheniya Tovstohan; Zinaida Turchyna

== Participating nations ==
Each qualified country was allowed to enter one team of 15 players and they all were eligible for participation. Five nations competed in both tournaments.

A total of 282(*) handball players (171 men and 111 women) from 15 nations (men from 12 nations - women from 8 nations) competed at the Seoul Games:

- Algeria (14) (men:14 women:0)
- China (12) (men:0 women:12)
- Ivory Coast (14) (men:0 women:14)
- Czechoslovakia (29) (men:14 women:15)
- East Germany (13) (men:13 women:0)
- Hungary (14) (men:14 women:0)
- Iceland (15) (men:15 women:0)
- Japan (15) (men:15 women:0)
- Norway (15) (men:0 women:15)
- South Korea (26) (men:14 women:12)
- Soviet Union (29) (men:15 women:15)
- Spain (15) (men:15 women:0)
- Sweden (14) (men:14 women:0)
- United States (28) (men:14 women:14)
- Yugoslavia (29) (men:15 women:14)

(*) NOTE: There are only players counted, which participated in one game at least.
