= Noh Hyun-suk =

South Korean handball player (born 1966)

Olympic medal record

Men's Handball
Silver medal – second place	1988 Seoul	Team

- Korean name
- Hangul: 노현석
- RR: No Hyeonseok
- MR: No Hyŏnsŏk

Noh Hyun-Suk (born October 10, 1966) is a male South Korean former handball player who competed in the 1988 Summer Olympics.

In 1988 he won the silver medal with the South Korean team. He played one match.
