= Aldona Nenėnienė =

Soviet handball player (1949–1999)

Medal record

Women's Handball

Representing Soviet Union

Olympic Games
Gold medal – first place	1976 Montreal	Team
Gold medal – first place	1980 Moscow	Team

World Championship
Silver medal – second place	1978 Czechoslovakia	Team

Aldona Nenėnienė-Česaitytė (born Česaitytė, 13 October 1949 – 3 April 1999) in Daugirdai village, Alytus district municipality) is a former Soviet/Lithuanian handball player who competed in the 1976 Summer Olympics and in the 1980 Summer Olympics.

She trained at VSS Žalgiris in Kaunas and became the Honoured Master of Sports of the USSR in 1976. At the 1976 Summer Olympics she won the gold medal with the Soviet team. She played one match and scored two goals.

Four years later she was part of the Soviet team which won the gold medal again. She played one match.
