= Yoon Tae-il =

South Korean handball player (born 1964)

- Korean name
- Hangul: 윤태일
- RR: Yun Taeil
- MR: Yun T'aeil

Olympic medal record

Men's handball

Representing South Korea
Silver medal – second place	1988 Seoul	Team

Yoon Tae-il (Korean: 윤태일; born 19 November 1964) is a South Korean former handball player who competed in the 1988 Summer Olympics.

In 1988 he won the silver medal with the South Korean team. He played all six matches as goalkeeper.

He coaches the Kazakhstan women's national handball team and participated at the 2011 World Women's Handball Championship.
