= Shin Young-suk =

South Korean handball player (born 1964)

- Korean name
- Hangul: 신영석
- RR: Sin Yeongseok
- MR: Sin Yŏngsŏk

Olympic medal record

Men's Handball
Silver medal – second place	1988 Seoul	Team

Shin Young-Suk (Korean: 신영석; born December 17, 1964) is a male South Korean former handball player who competed in the 1988 Summer Olympics.

In 1988 he won the silver medal with the South Korean team. He played all six matches and scored nine goals.
