= Andrey Tyumentsev =

Soviet handball player

Personal information
- Full name: Andrey Alekseevich Tyumentsev
- Nationality: Russian
- Born: 6 May 1963 (age 63) Vladivostok, Russia
- Height: 1.90 m (6 ft 3 in)

Sport
- Sport: Handball
- Position: Centre back
- Current club: Retired

Senior clubs
- Years: Team
- 1979-1991: Dinamo Astrakhan
- 1991-1993: BM Granollers
- 1993-1994: BM Puleva Málaga
National team
- Years: Team
- –: Soviet Union
- –: Russia
Medal record
Men's handball
Representing Soviet Union
Olympic Games
Gold medal – first place	1988 Seoul	Team
World Championships
Silver medal – second place	1990 Czechoslovakia	Team

Andrey Alekseevich Tyumentsev (Russian: Андрей Алексеевич Тюменцев; born May 6, 1963, in Vladivostok) is a former Soviet/Russian handball player who competed in the 1988 Summer Olympics.

In 1988, he won the gold medal with the Soviet team. He played all six matches and scored 21 goals. He was mainly used as a substitute to Georgi Sviridenko.

At the 1990 World Championship he reached the final, where the Soviet Union lost to Sweden.

== Club career ==
At club level Tyumentsev played for Dynamo Astrakhan, until the dissolution of the Soviet Union, after which he joined Spanish side BM Granollers and later BM Puleva Málaga. He retired in 1994.

With Dynamo Astrakhan he came second the Soviet Championship in 1989 and in 1991.

In 1983 he was part of Soviet Union team that won the Youth World Championship.
