= Choi Suk-jae =

South Korean handball player (born 1966)

- Hangul: 최석재
- Hanja: 崔晳在
- RR: Choe Seokjae
- MR: Ch'oe Sŏkchae

Olympic medal record

Men's handball

Representing South Korea
| Silver medal – second place | 1988 Seoul | Team |

Choi Suk-jae (born November 7, 1966) is a male South Korean former handball player who competed in the 1988 Summer Olympics and in the 1992 Summer Olympics.

In 1988 he won the silver medal with the South Korean team. He played all six matches as goalkeeper.

Four years later he finished sixth with the South Korean team in the 1992 Olympic tournament. He played all six matches as goalkeeper again.
