= Jožef Holpert =

Serbian handball player (born 1961)

Personal information
- Nationality: Serbian
- Born: 13 March 1961 (age 65) Bezdan, FPR Yugoslavia
- Height: 1.84 m (6 ft 0 in)

Sport
- Sport: Handball
- Position: Right back

Senior clubs
- Years: Team
- 1977–1992: RK Crvenka
National team
Years	Team	Apps	(Gls)
–	Yugoslavia	129	(237)
Medal record
Representing Yugoslavia
Olympic Games
Bronze medal – third place	1988 Seoul	Team
World Championship
Gold medal – first place	1986 Switzerland	Team

Jožef Holpert (born 13 March 1961 in Bezdan) is a former Yugoslav handball player who was part of the Yugoslava team that won the 1986 World Championship. In 1988, he was part of the Yugoslav team, which won the bronze medals at the 1988 Summer Olympics. He played all six matches and scored 15 goals.

== Career ==
Holpert played 15 years for RK Crvenka, where he won the 1988 Yugoslav Cup.

At the 1981 U21 World Championship he won gold medals.

== Private ==
His son who is also called, Jožef Holpert, is also a handball player who played for the Serbian national team. His daughter also plays handball.
