= Son Mi-na =

South Korean handball player (born 1964)

Medal record

Women's Handball

Representing South Korea

Olympic Games
Gold medal – first place	1988 Seoul	Team
Silver medal – second place	1984 Los Angeles	Team

Son Mi-na (Korean: 손미나; born October 8, 1964) is a South Korean team handball player and Olympic champion.

She participated at the 1984 Summer Olympics in Los Angeles where she received a silver medal with the South Korean team. At the 1988 Summer Olympics in Seoul she won a gold medal.

Shon also took the Athlete's oath with basketball player Hur Jae during the opening ceremonies of the 1988 Games in Seoul.
