= Yevheniya Tovstohan =

Ukrainian handball player

Olympic medal record

Women's Handball
Bronze medal – third place	1988 Seoul	Soviet Union

Yevheniya Tovstohan (Ukrainian: Євгенія Товстоган, born April 3, 1965) is a Ukrainian former handball player who competed for the Soviet Union in the 1988 Summer Olympics.

In 1988 she won the bronze medal with the Soviet team. She played four matches and scored ten goals.

== Biography ==
Yevheniya Tovstohan
