= Suk Min-hee =

South Korean handball player (born 1968)

Personal information
- Born: 7 September 1968 (age 58)
- Height: 1.73 m (5 ft 8 in)

Sport
- Sport: Handball
National team
- Years: Team
- –: South Korea
Medal record
Representing South Korea
Women's handball
Olympic Games
Gold medal – first place	1988 Seoul	Team
Asian Games
Gold medal – first place	1990 Beyjing

Suk Min-Hee (Korean: 석민희; born September 7, 1968), also spelled as Seok Min-hui, is a South Korean team handball player and Olympic champion. She played with the South Korean national team and received a gold medal at the 1988 Summer Olympics in Seoul.

She also won a gold medal with Korea at the 1990 Asian Games.
