= Lee Ki-soon =

South Korean handball player (born 1966)

Medal record

Representing South Korea

Women's handball

Olympic Games
Gold medal – first place	1988 Seoul	Team

Lee Ki-Soon (born August 15, 1966) is a South Korean team handball player and Olympic champion. She received a gold medal with the South Korean team at the 1988 Summer Olympics in Seoul.
