= Kim Myung-soon =

South Korean handball player (born 1964)

Medal record

Women's handball

Representing South Korea

Olympic Games
Gold medal – first place	1988 Seoul	Team

Kim Myung-Soon (Korean: 김명순; born April 15, 1964), also spelled as Kim Myeong-sun, is a South Korean team handball player and Olympic champion. She received a gold medal with the South Korean team at the 1988 Summer Olympics in Seoul.
