= Olena Nemashkalo =

Ukrainian handball player (born 1963)

Olympic medal record

Women's Handball
Bronze medal – third place	1988 Seoul	Team

Olena Mykolayivna Nemashkalo (Ukrainian: Олена Миколаївна Немашкало, Russian: Елена Николаевна Немашкало; born 25 December 1963 in Leningrad) is a Soviet, Ukrainian and Croatian former handball player.

She competed for the Soviet Union in the 1988 Summer Olympics where she won the bronze medal with the Soviet team. She played all five matches and scored eight goals. At the 1990 World Championship she won the gold medal and was elected best left winger of the competition.

Later, she competed for Croatia in the 1996 European Championship where she finished second top scorer with 41 goals.

Her daughter, Ekatarina Nemaškalo, is also a handballer who competed for Croatia national team.
