= Olha Semenova =

Ukrainian handball player

Olympic medal record

Women's Handball
Bronze medal – third place	1988 Seoul	Team

Olha Semenova (Ukrainian: Ольга Семенова, born October 6, 1964) is a Ukrainian former handball player who competed for the Soviet Union in the 1988 Summer Olympics.

In 1988 she won the bronze medal with the Soviet team. She played three matches and scored six goals.
