= Han Hyun-sook =

South Korean handball player (born 1970)

Medal record

Representing South Korea

Women's handball

Olympic Games
Gold medal – first place	1988 Seoul	Team
Gold medal – first place	1992 Barcelona	Team

- Han Hyun-sook
- Hangul: 한현숙
- RR: Han Hyeonsuk
- MR: Han Hyŏnsuk

Han Hyun-Sook (born March 17, 1970) is a South Korean team handball player and Olympic champion. She received a gold medal with the South Korean team at the 1988 Summer Olympics in Seoul. At the 1992 Summer Olympics in Barcelona she received a second gold medal.
