= Kim Kyung-soon =

South Korean handball player (born 1965)

Medal record

Representing South Korea

Women's handball

Olympic Games
Gold medal – first place	1988 Seoul	Team
Silver medal – second place	1984 Los Angeles	Team

Kim Kyung-Soon (Korean: 김경순; born December 10, 1965), also spelled Kim Gyeong-sun, is a South Korean team handball player and Olympic champion. She received a silver medal with the South Korean team at the 1984 Summer Olympics in Los Angeles, and she received a gold medal at the 1988 Summer Olympics in Seoul.
