= Lim Mi-kyung =

South Korean handball player (born 1967)

Medal record

Women's handball

Representing South Korea

Olympic Games
Gold medal – first place	1988 Seoul	Team

Asian Games
Gold medal – first place	1990 Beyjing	

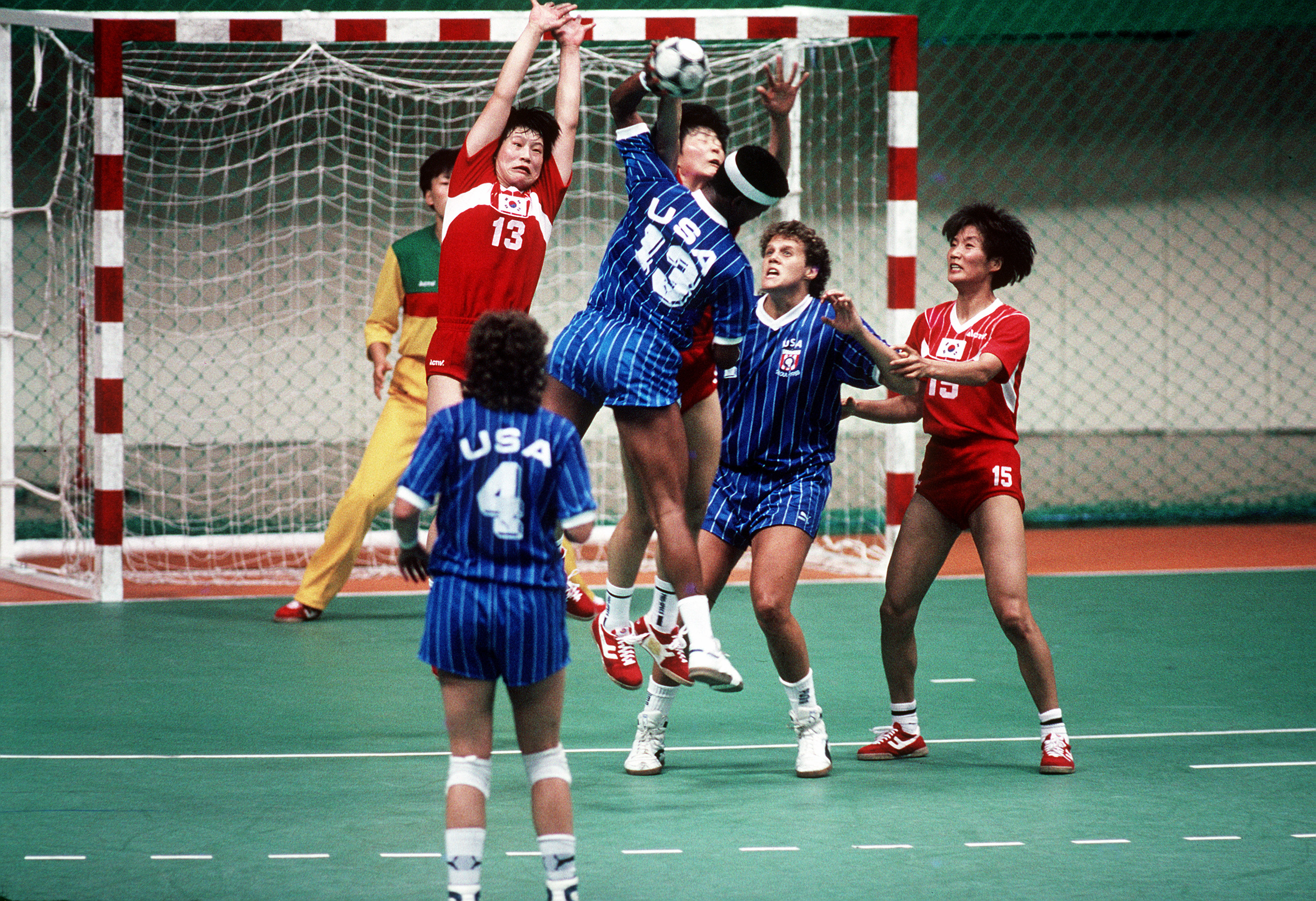
Lim Mi-Kyung (#13 red) tries to stop Leora Jones's shot during the 1988 Summer Olympics.

Lim Mi-Kyung (born May 17, 1967) is a South Korean team handball player and Olympic champion. She played for the South Korean team at the 1988 Summer Olympics in Seoul and won the gold medal.

She also won a gold medal with Korea at the 1990 Asian Games.
