= Hanne Hogness =

Norwegian handball player (born 1967)

Personal information
- Nationality: Norwegian
- Born: 16 February 1967 (age 59) Trondheim, Norway
- Height: 167 cm (66 in)

Sport
- Sport: Handball
- Position: Right wing

Senior clubs
- Years: Team
- –: Ås IL
- –: Sverresborg IF
- –: Toten HK
National team
Years	Team	Apps	(Gls)
1986–1994	Norway	186	(378)
Medal record
Representing Norway
Women's handball
Olympic Games
Silver medal – second place	1988 Seoul	Team
Silver medal – second place	1992 Barcelona	Team
World championship
Bronze medal – third place	1986 Netherlands	Team

Hanne Hogness (born 16 February 1967) is a Norwegian team handball player and Olympic medalist. She was born in Trondheim, and represented the club Sverresborg IF. She received silver medals at the 1988 Summer Olympics in Seoul with the Norwegian national team, and at the 1992 Summer Olympics in Barcelona.

Hogness played 186 matches and scored 378 goals for the Norwegian national handball team between 1986 and 1994.

She was awarded the Håndballstatuetten trophy from the Norwegian Handball Federation in 1998.
