= Nataliia Mytriuk =

Soviet handball player

Olympic medal record

Women's Handball
Bronze medal – third place	1988 Seoul	Team

Nataliia Mytriuk (Ukrainian: Наталія Митрюк, born November 26, 1959) is a Ukrainian former handball player who competed for the Soviet Union in the 1988 Summer Olympics. In 1982 and 1986, as part of the USSR women's handball team, she became a two-time world champion.

In 1988, she won the bronze medal with the Soviet team. She played four matches as goalkeeper.

== Biography ==
Nataliia Mytriuk was born on November 29, 1959 in Uzhgorod.

In 1976–1977, she played for sport clubs Kolos (Berehove) and in 1977 moved to Spartak (Kyiv) where she stayed till 1990. She also played for Radnychki (Belgrade) in 1992–1994, Savski Venats (Belgrade) in 1994–1996. In 1997, she came back to Spartak and stayed there until 1999. In 2001 Mytriuk joined Messana (Sicily, Italy) where she stayed till 2003. In 2007, she played for Chicago-Inter.
