= Maryna Bazanova =

Russian handball player (1962–2020)

Personal information
- Native name: Марина Базанова
- Born: 25 December 1962 Omsk, Russian SFSR, Soviet Union
- Died: 27 April 2020 (aged 57) Bremen, Germany
- Height: 5 ft 6 in (168 cm)
- Weight: 154 lb (70 kg)

Sport
- Sport: Handball
Medal record
Representing Soviet Union
Olympic Games
Bronze medal – third place	1988 Seoul	Team
World Championship
Gold medal – first place	1982 Hungary	Team
Gold medal – first place	1986 Netherlands	Team
Gold medal – first place	1990 South Korea	Team
Representing Unified Team
Olympic Games
Bronze medal – third place	1992 Barcelona	Team

Maryna Bazanova (Ukrainian: Марина Базанова, 25 December 1962 – 27 April 2020) was a Ukrainian handball player who competed for the Soviet Union in the 1988 Summer Olympics and for the Unified Team in the 1992 Summer Olympics.

Bazanova was born in Omsk and played for Spartak Kiev, TuS Walle Bremen and Werder Bremen. In 1988 she won the bronze medal with the Soviet team. She played all five matches and scored 13 goals.

Four years later she was a member of the Unified Team which won the bronze medal. She played all five matches and scored 19 goals.

She also won the World Women's Handball Championship three times, in 1982, 1986 and 1990.

Bazanova coached TuS Walle Bremen and led the team to two Handball-Bundesliga championships. She left the club in 1997.

She died in Bremen, Germany.
