= Karin Singstad =

Norwegian handball player (born 1958)

Personal information
- Nationality: Norwegian
- Born: 29 December 1958 (age 67) Trondheim, Norway
- Height: 173 cm (68 in)

Sport
- Sport: Handball
- Position: Pivot

Senior clubs
- Years: Team
- –: Sverresborg IF
National team
Years	Team	Apps	(Gls)
1984–1989	Norway	83	(33)
Medal record
Representing Norway
Women's handball
Olympic Games
Silver medal – second place	1988 Seoul	Team
World championship
Bronze medal – third place	1986 Netherlands	Team

Karin Singstad (born 29 December 1958) is a Norwegian team handball player and Olympic medalist. She was born in Trondheim, and represented the club Sverresborg IF. She received a silver medal at the 1988 Summer Olympics in Seoul with the Norwegian national team. She was also part of the Norwegian team that won bronze medals at the 1986 World Women's Handball Championship in the Netherlands. Singstad played 83 matches and scored 33 goals for the Norwegian national handball team between 1984 and 1989.
