= Sung Kyung-hwa =

South Korean handball player (born 1965)

Personal information
- Born: 20 July 1965 (age 61)
- Height: 1.73 m (5 ft 8 in)

Sport
- Sport: Handball
National team
- Years: Team
- –: South Korea
Medal record
Representing South Korea
Women's handball
Olympic Games
Gold medal – first place	1988 Seoul	Team
Silver medal – second place	1984 Los Angeles	Team

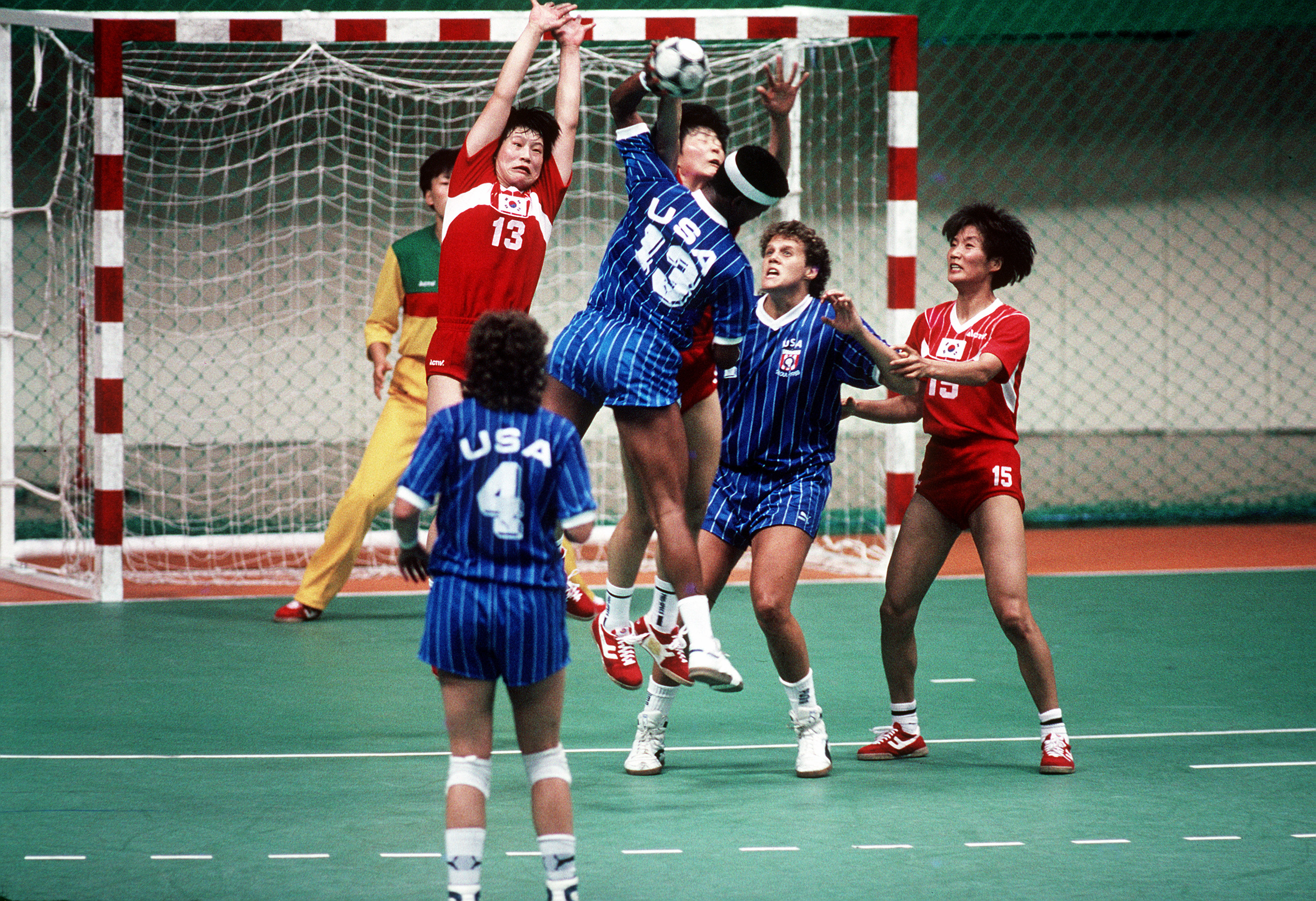
Sung Kyung-Hwa (#15 red) during the 1988 Summer Olympics.

Sung Kyung-Hwa (Korean: 성경화; born July 20, 1965), also spelled as Seong Gyeong-hwa, is a South Korean team handball player and Olympic champion. She received a silver medal with the South Korean team at the 1984 Summer Olympics in Los Angeles. Her team won the gold medals at the 1988 Summer Olympics in Seoul.
