= Kim Choon-rye =

South Korean handball player (born 1966)

Medal record

Representing South Korea

Women's handball

Olympic Games
Gold medal – first place	1988 Seoul	Team
Silver medal – second place	1984 Los Angeles	Team

Kim Choon-Rye (Korean: 김춘례; RR: Kim Chullye, born June 21, 1966) is a South Korean team handball player and Olympic champion. She received a silver medal at the 1984 Summer Olympics in Los Angeles, and she received a gold medal with the South Korean team at the 1988 Summer Olympics in Seoul.
