= Song Ji-hyun =

South Korean handball player (born 1969)

Medal record

Representing South Korea

Women's handball

Olympic Games
Gold medal – first place	1988 Seoul	Team

Asian Games
Gold medal – first place	1990 Beyjing	

Song Ji-hyun (Korean: 송지현; born January 23, 1969), also spelled as Song Ji-Hyeon, is a South Korean team handball player and Olympic champion. She won a gold medal with the South Korean team at the 1988 Summer Olympics in Seoul.

She also won a gold medal with Korea at the 1990 Asian Games.
