= Yuri Nesterov =

Soviet handball player

Personal information
- Full name: Yuri Igorevich Nesterov
- Born: March 24, 1967 (age 59) Leningrad, Soviet Union
- Height: 206 cm (81 in)

Sport
- Sport: Handball
- Position: Pivot

Youth career
- Years: Team
- –: HC Neva

Senior clubs
- Years: Team
- –: Chekhovskiye Medvedi
- –1991: HC Neva
- 1991–1993: SDC San Antonio
- 1993–1994: Teka Santander
- 1994–1998: Academia Octavio Vigo
- 1998–2001: ABC/UMinho
- 2001–2003: SD Teucro
- 2003–2004: Bidasoa Irún
- 2004–2005: SD Teucro
- 2005: SC Magdeburg
- 2006–2007: BM Porriño
- 2008: Conservas Boya de Camariñas
National team
Years	Team	
–	Soviet Union	
–	Russia	125
Medal record
Men's handball
Representing Soviet Union
Olympic Games
Gold medal – first place	1988 Seoul	Team
World Championships
Silver medal – second place	1990 Czechoslovakia	Team

Yuri Igorevich Nesterov (Russian: Юрий Игоревич Нестеров, born March 24, 1967, in Leningrad) is a former Soviet/Russian handball player who competed in the 1988 Summer Olympics.

In 1988 he won the gold medal with the Soviet team. He played all six matches and scored ten goals.
