= Natalya Lapitskaya =

Russian handball player

Olympic medal record

Representing the Soviet Union

Olympic Games
Bronze medal – third place	1988 Seoul	Team

World Championship
Gold medal – first place	1982 Hungary	Team
Gold medal – first place	1986 Netherlands	Team

Natalya Yuryevna Cygankova, (former Lapitskaya), (Russian: Наталья Цыганкова), born August 12, 1962, is a Russian former handball player who competed for the Soviet Union in the 1988 Summer Olympics.

In 1988 she won the bronze medal with the Soviet team. She played all five matches and scored 17 goals.
