= Vibeke Johnsen =

Norwegian handball player (born 1968)

Personal information
- Born: 16 October 1968 (age 58) Trondheim, Norway

Sport
- Sport: Handball
- Position: Goalkeeper

Senior clubs
- Years: Team
- –: Sverresborg IF
National team
Years	Team	Apps
1987–1991	Norway	24
Medal record
Representing Norway
Women's handball
Olympic Games
Silver medal – second place	1988 Seoul	Team Competition

Vibeke Johnsen (born 16 October 1968) is a Norwegian team handball player and Olympic medalist. She received a silver medal at the 1988 Summer Olympics in Seoul with the Norwegian national team. She played 24 games for the national team during her career, between 1987 and 1991.
