= Svitlana Mankova =

Ukrainian handball player

Olympic medal record

Women's Handball
Bronze medal – third place	1988 Seoul	Team

Svitlana Kostiantynivna Mankova (Ukrainian: Світлана Костянтинівна Манькова, born December 1, 1962, in Sverdlovsk, Soviet Union) is a former Ukrainian handball player who competed for the Soviet Union in the 1988 Summer Olympics.

In 1988 she won the bronze medal with the Soviet team. She played three matches and scored one goal.
