= Berit Digre =

Norwegian handball player (born 1967)

Personal information
- Nationality: Norwegian
- Born: 3 April 1967 (age 59) Trondheim

Sport
- Sport: Handball

Senior clubs
- Years: Team
- –: Sjetne IL
National team
Years	Team	Apps	(Gls)
1985–1989	Norway	46	(25)
Medal record
Representing Norway
Women's handball
Olympic Games
Silver medal – second place	1988 Seoul	Team Competition

Berit Digre (born 3 April 1967) is a Norwegian team handball player and Olympic medalist. She received a silver medal at the 1988 Summer Olympics in Seoul with the Norwegian national team. She made 46 international appearances and scored 25 goals. She spent most of her career playing for Sjetne IL.
