= Natalya Anisimova (handballer) =

Russian handball player

Personal information
- Full name: Natalya Yuryevna Anisimova
- Nationality: Russian
- Born: 16 November 1960 (age 65) Krasnodar Krai, Soviet Union

Sport
- Sport: Handball

Senior clubs
- Years: Team
- –1992: HC Kuban Krasnodar
- 1992–1996: ŽRK Budućnost Podgorica
National team
- Years: Team
- –: Soviet Union
- –: Unified team
- –: Russia
Medal record
World Women's Championship
Representing the Soviet Union
Gold medal – first place	1982 Hungary	Team
Women's Handball
Representing the Soviet Union
Bronze medal – third place	1988 Seoul	Team
Representing the Unified Team
Bronze medal – third place	1992 Barcelona	Team

Natalya Yuryevna Anisimova, née Guskova (Russian: Наталья Анисимова), born 16 November 1960, is a Russian former handball player who won gold medals at the 1982 World Championship, and competed for the Soviet Union in the 1988 Summer Olympics and for the Unified Team in the 1992 Summer Olympics. She is considered one of the best Russian handballers of the 20th century.

== Career ==
Anisimova played for HC Kuban Krasnodar until 1992. Here she won the Soviet Union Women's Handball Championship in 1989 and the Russian Women's Handball Super League in 1992. She then joined ŽRK Budućnost Podgorica in Serbia and Montenegro, where she played until 1996.

== National team ==
In 1982 she won World Championship in Hungary.

In 1986 she won gold at the 1986 Goodwill Games.

In 1988 she won the bronze medal with the Soviet team. She played all five matches and scored 13 goals.

Four years later she was a member of the Unified Team which won the bronze medal. She played one match.
