= Sverresborg IF =

Norwegian sports club

- Full name: Sverresborg Idrettsforening
- Founded: 30 October 1931
- Ground: Havsteinbanen, Trondheim
- League: Fourth Division
Home colours

Sverresborg Idrettsforening is a Norwegian sports club from Trondheim, Sør-Trøndelag. It has sections for association football, team handball and basketball ("Sverresborg Hoops").

It was founded on 30 October 1931, named after the fortress Sverresborg.

The women's handball team was a club flagship, winning one league title and three cup titles between 1981 and 1986. The men's football team plays in the Third Division, the fourth tier of Norwegian football after being promoted in 2012. It also played in the Third Division earlier but faced relegations in 1994, 1996 and 2005.
