= Ingrid Steen =

Norwegian handball player (born 1967)

Medal record

Representing Norway

Women's handball

Olympic Games
Silver medal – second place	1988 Seoul	Team Competition
Silver medal – second place	1992 Barcelona	Team Competition

Ingrid Steen (born December 12, 1967, in Trondheim) is a Norwegian team handball player and Olympic medalist. She received silver medals at the 1988 Summer Olympics in Seoul with the Norwegian national team, and at the 1992 Summer Olympics in Barcelona. Ingrid Steen played 161 games for the national team during her career, scoring 588 goals.

She was awarded the Håndballstatuetten trophy from the Norwegian Handball Federation in 2011.

Her sister Pia Steen was also a handballer and her brother Christian Steen was a footballer.
