= Marte Eliasson =

Norwegian handball player (born 1969)

Medal record

Representing Norway

Women's handball

Olympic Games
Silver medal – second place	1988 Seoul	Team Competition

World Championship
Bronze medal – third place	1993 Norway	

European Championship
Bronze medal – third place	1994 Germany	

Marte Eliasson (born 27 September 1969 in Trondheim) is a Norwegian team handball player and Olympic medalist. She received a silver medal at the 1988 Summer Olympics in Seoul with the Norwegian national team. She also won a bronze medal at the 1993 World Women's Handball Championship and at the Inaugural 1994 European Women's Handball Championship. Marte Eliasson played 145 games for the national team during her career, scoring 179 goals.

She was awarded the Håndballstatuetten trophy from the Norwegian Handball Federation in 2013.
