= Kristin Midthun =

Norwegian handball player (born 1961)

Susanne Hannestad
Personal information
- Nationality: Norwegian
- Born: 4 February 1961 (age 65) Oslo, Norway
- Height: 173 cm (68 in)

Sport
- Sport: Handball
- Position: Left wing

Senior clubs
- Years: Team
- –: IL Vestar
National team
Years	Team	Apps	(Gls)
1982-1988	Norway	143	(306)
Medal record
Olympic Games
Silver medal – second place	1988 Seoul	Team Competition

Kristin Midthun (born February 4, 1961, in Oslo) is a Norwegian team handball player and an Olympic medalist.

== Life and career ==
Born in Oslo on 4 February 1961, Miidthun won a silver medal at the 1988 Summer Olympics in Seoul with the Norwegian national team. Kristin Midthun played 143 games for the national team during her career, scoring 306 goals.

She was awarded the trophy Håndballstatuetten from the Norwegian Handball Federation in 1998.
