= Heidi Sundal =

Norwegian handball player (born 1962)

Personal information
- Born: October 30, 1962 (age 63) Oslo, Norway
- Height: 181 cm (71 in)

Sport
- Sport: Handball
- Position: Pivot

Senior clubs
- Years: Team
- –: Nordstrand IF
National team
Years	Team	Apps	(Gls)
1980–1993	Norway	269	(731)
Medal record
Olympic Games
Silver medal – second place	1988 Seoul	Team Competition
Silver medal – second place	1992 Barcelona	Team Competition
World Women's Handball Championship
Bronze medal – third place	1986 Netherlands	Team
Bronze medal – third place	1993 Norway	Team

Heidi Sundal (born October 30, 1962, in Oslo) is a Norwegian team handball player and Olympic medalist. She received silver medals at the 1988 Summer Olympics in Seoul with the Norwegian national team, and at the 1992 Summer Olympics in Barcelona. She also won two world championship bronze medals, one at the 1986 World Championship and another at the 1993 World Championship. Heidi Sundal played 269 games for the national team during her career, scoring 731 goals.

Sundal was awarded the Håndballstatuetten trophy from the Norwegian Handball Federation in 1998.
