= Kjerstin Andersen =

Norwegian handball player (born 1958)

Personal information
- Nationality: Norwegian
- Born: 23 November 1958 (age 67) Porsgrunn, Norway
- Height: 179 cm (70 in)

Sport
- Sport: Handball
- Position: Goalkeeper

Senior clubs
- Years: Team
- –: Skien BK
- –: Gjerpen IF
National team
Years	Team	Apps
1984–1990	Norway	106
Medal record
Olympic Games
Silver medal – second place	1988 Seoul	Team
World championship
Bronze medal – third place	1986 Netherlands	Team

Kjerstin Andersen (born 23 November 1958) is a Norwegian former team handball goalkeeper and Olympic medalist. She won a silver medal at the 1988 Summer Olympics in Seoul with the Norwegian national team.

== Handball career ==
=== Club career ===
Andersen played for the clubs Skien BK and Gjerpen IF. She won national titles with Gjerpen in 1985 and 1986.

=== International career ===
Andersen played 106 games for the national team during her career, between 1984 and 1990. She won a bronze medal with the national team at the 1986 World Women's Handball Championship, and a silver medal at the 1988 Summer Olympics.

=== Awards ===
She was awarded the Håndballstatuetten trophy from the Norwegian Handball Federation in 2021.

== Personal life ==
Andersen was born in Porsgrunn on 23 November 1958.
