= Karin Pettersen =

Norwegian handball player (born 1964)

Medal record

Representing Norway

Women's handball

Olympic Games
Silver medal – second place	1988 Seoul	Team Competition
Silver medal – second place	1992 Barcelona	Team Competition

World Championship
Bronze medal – third place	1993 Norway	

Karin Ryen (née Karin Pettersen, 21 November 1964 in Frosta Municipality) is a Norwegian team handball player and Olympic medalist. She received silver medals at the 1988 Summer Olympics in Seoul with the Norwegian national team, and at the 1992 Summer Olympics in Barcelona. Karin Pettersen played 250 games for the national team during her career, scoring 546 goals. She also won a bronze medal at the 1993 World Women's Handball Championship.

At club level she played for Frosta IL and Byåsen IL. With Byåsen she won the Norwegian Championship three times.
