= Hanne Hegh =

Norwegian handball player (born 1960)

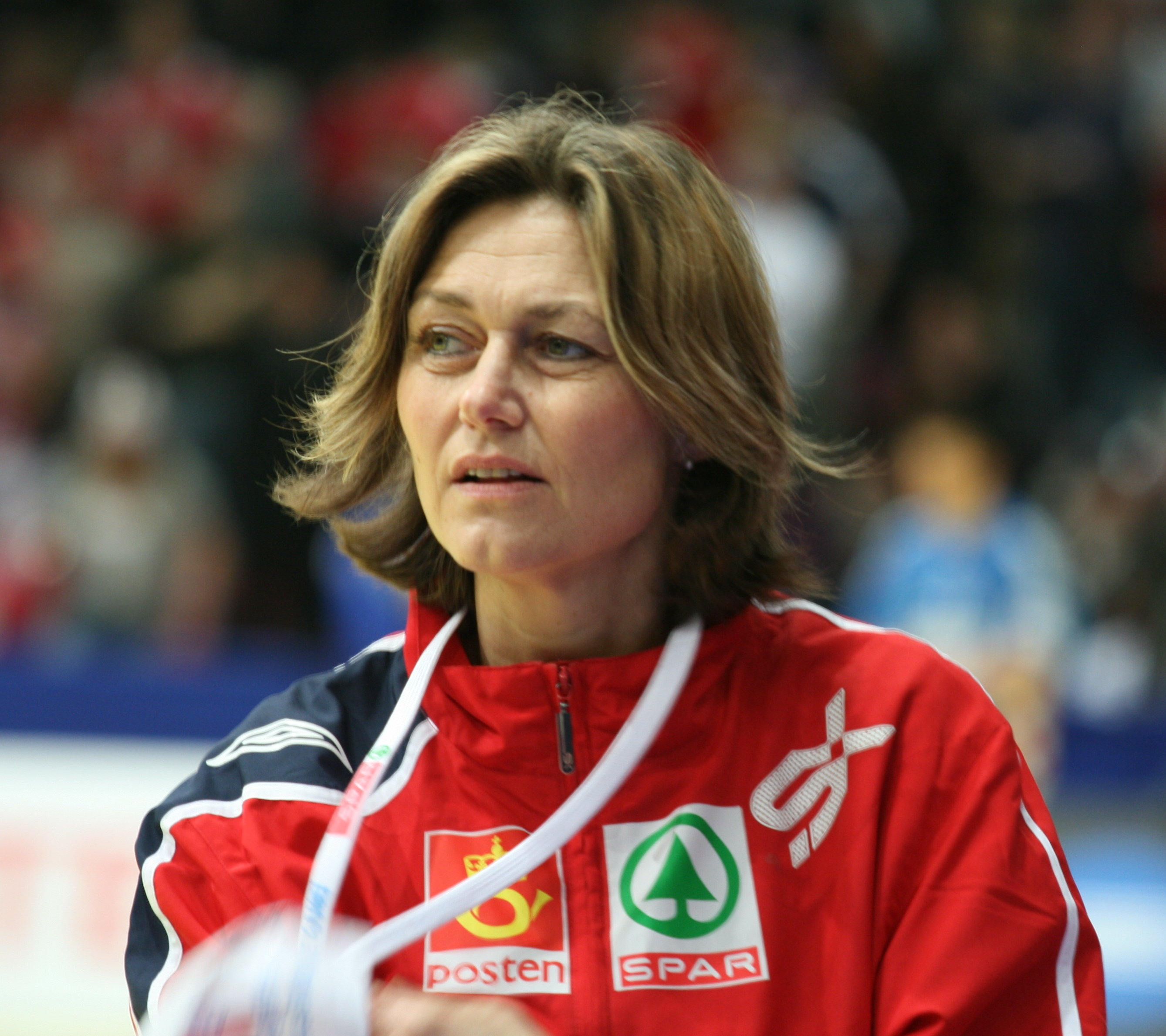
- Hanne Hegh 2008
- Born: 27 April 1960 (age 66); Oslo, Norway
- Education: Norwegian School of Sport Sciences
- Children: Emilie Hegh Arntzen
- Handball career
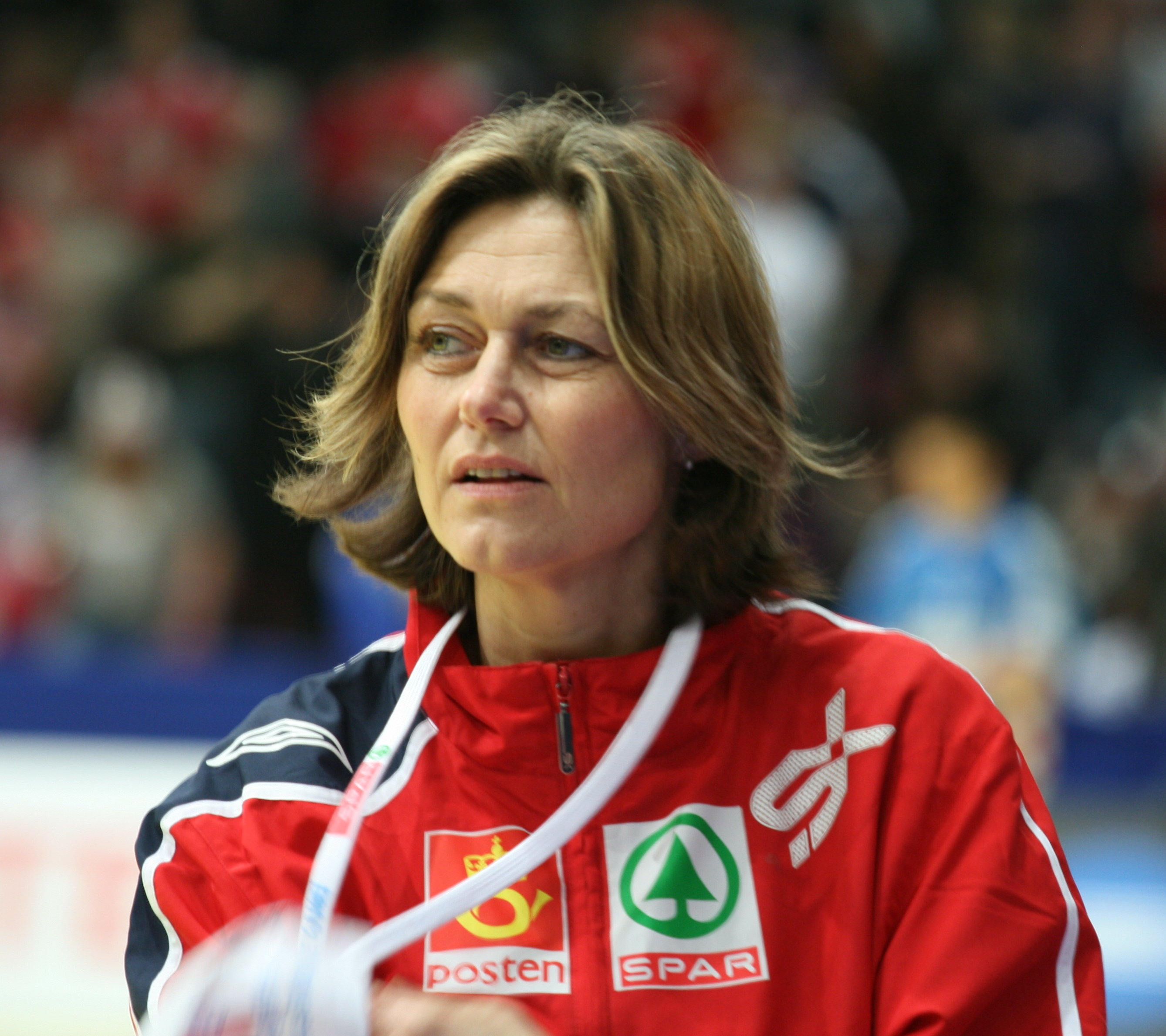
- Height: 180 cm (71 in)
- Sport: Handball
- Position: Back

Senior clubs
- Years: Team
- ?–: Oppsal
- 1981–1993: Gjerpen IF
National team
Years	Team	Apps	(Gls)
1979–1990	Norway	202	(361)
Medal record
Representing Norway
Women's handball
Olympic Games
Silver medal – second place	1988 Seoul	Team
World championship
Bronze medal – third place	1986 Netherlands	Team

Hanne Hegh (born 27 April 1960) is a Norwegian team handball player and Olympic medalist.

== Playing career ==
=== Club career ===
From 1981 to 1993 she played for Gjerpen IF, where she won 9 Norwegian championships. In 1987 she was top scorer in Eliteserien, and was named player of the year in Norway.

=== National team ===
She made her debut for the Norwegian national team in 1979 against the Soviet Union. Hanne Hegh was captain on the first Norway national team winning a medal in an international championship, the bronze medal at the 1986 World Women's Handball Championship. She won a silver medal at the 1988 Summer Olympics in Seoul with the Norwegian national team. Hanne Hegh played 202 games for the national team between 1979 and 1990, scoring 361 goals.

=== Awards and recognitions ===
Hegh was awarded the Håndballstatuetten trophy from the Norwegian Handball Federation in 1998.

== Coach ==
She was educated at Norges idrettshøgskole. From 1997 to 2010 Hanne Hegh was on the coaching squad of the Norway men's national handball team. As of 2010 she was a teacher at Grenland Folkehøgskole in Porsgrunn, Norway.

== Personal life ==
Hegh was born in Oslo on 27 April 1960. She is the mother of international handball player Emilie Hegh Arntzen.
