= Georgi Sviridenko =

Belarusian handball player

Personal information
- Full name: Georgi Vladimirovich Sviridenko
- Nationality: Belarusian
- Born: 3 December 1962 (age 63) Minsk, Byelorussian SSR

Sport
- Sport: Handball

Senior clubs
- Years: Team
- 1981–1990: SKA Minsk
- 1991–1993: CUS Palermo
- 1993–1995: SV Blau-Weiss Spandau
National team
Years	Team	Apps
–	Soviet Union	132

Teams managed
- 1995–1996: SKA Minsk
- 1996–2000: SV BW Spandau
- 2000–2003: TV Grambke Bremen
- –: Füchse Berlin
- –: Dessau-Roßlauer HV
- –2010: HSG Düsseldorf
- 2010–2012: HSC 2000 Coburg
- 2012–2013: Dessau-Roßlauer HV
- 2013–2015: VfL Gummersbach (U23)
- 2015–: MT Melsungen B
Medal record
Representing Soviet Union
Olympic Games
Gold medal – first place	1988 Seoul	Team
World Championships
Silver medal – second place	1990 Czechoslovakia	Team

Georgi Vladimirovich Sviridenko (Belarusian: Георгій Уладзіміравіч Свірыдзенка; Russian: Георгий Владимирович Свириденко; born December 3, 1962, in Minsk, Belarusian SSR) is a former Soviet/Belarusian handball player and coach who competed in the 1988 Summer Olympics.

Sviridenko played for SKA Minsk from 1981 to 1990. In 1991-1993, he played for Italian teams, "Ortigia Siracusa" and "CUS Palermo". With SKA Minsk he won Soviet Men's Handball Championship several times, as well as the EHF Champions League in 1987, 1989 and 1990.

In 1988 he won the gold medal with the Soviet team. He played all six matches and scored twelve goals. He also won a silver medal at the World Championship in 1990.

Sviridenko received Order of Honor in 2008.

== Private ==
His daughter, Alexandra, plays handball for the German second tier team BVB Füchse Berlin.

His sister Irina Sumnikova is a former basketball player for the Soviet Union, who won gold medals at the 1992 Summer Olympics.
