= Handball at the 1992 Summer Olympics – Women's team squads =

List of handball players

The following squads and players competed in the women's handball tournament at the 1992 Summer Olympics.

== Austria ==
The following players represented Austria:

- Barbara Strass
- Edith Matei
- Iris Morhammer
- Jasna Kolar-Merdan
- Jadranka Jez
- Karin Prokop
- Kerstin Jönßon
- Liliana Topea
- Marianna Racz
- Nataliya Rusnachenko
- Nicole Peissl
- Stanka Bozovic
- Slavica Djukić
- Teresa Zurowski

== Germany ==
The following players represented Germany:

- Andrea Bölk
- Andrea Stolletz
- Anja Krüger
- Bianca Urbanke
- Birgit Wagner
- Carola Ciszewski
- Eike Bram
- Elena Leonte
- Gabriele Palme
- Kerstin Mühlner
- Michaela Erler
- Rita Köster
- Sabine Adamik
- Silke Fittinger
- Silvia Schmitt
- Sybille Gruner

== Nigeria ==
The following players represented Nigeria:

- Agustina Nkechi Abi
- Angela Ajodo
- Barbara Diribe
- Bridget Yamala Egwolosan
- Chiaka Lauretta Ihebom
- Eunice Idausa
- Immaculate Nwaogu
- Justina Akpulo
- Justina Anyiam
- Mary Ihedioha
- Mary Nwachukwu
- Mary Soronadi
- Ngozi Opara
- Auta Olivia Sana
- Uzoma Azuka
- Victoria Umunna

== Norway ==
The following players represented Norway:

- Hege Kirsti Frøseth
- Tonje Sagstuen
- Hanne Hogness
- Heidi Sundal
- Susann Goksør
- Cathrine Svendsen
- Mona Dahle
- Siri Eftedal
- Henriette Henriksen
- Ingrid Steen
- Karin Pettersen
- Annette Skotvoll
- Kristine Duvholt
- Heidi Tjugum

== South Korea ==
The following players represented South Korea:

- Cha Jae-Kyung
- Han Hyun-Sook
- Han Sun-Hee
- Hong Jeong-ho
- Jang Ri-Ra
- Kim Hwa-Sook
- Lee Ho-Youn
- Lee Mi-Young
- Lim O-Kyeong
- Min Hye-Sook
- Moon Hyang-Ja
- Nam Eun-Young
- Oh Sung-Ok
- Park Jeong-Lim
- Park Kap-Sook

== Spain ==
The following players represented Spain:

- Amaia Ugartamendía
- Blanca Martín-Calero
- Cristina Gómez
- Dolores Ruiz
- Esperanza Tercero
- Karmele Makazaga
- Eugenia Sánchez
- Mercedes Fuertes
- Montserrat Marin
- Montse Puche
- Paloma Arranz
- Raquel Vizcaíno
- Rita Hernández
- Begoña Sánchez

== Unified Team ==
The following players represented the Unified Team:

- Natalya Anisimova
- Maryna Bazhanova
- Svetlana Bogdanova
- Galina Borzenkova
- Natalya Deryugina
- Tatyana Dzhandzhgava
- Lyudmila Gudz
- Elina Guseva
- Tetyana Horb
- Larisa Kiselyova
- Natalya Morskova
- Galina Onopriyenko
- Svetlana Pryakhina

== United States ==
The following players represented United States:

- Sharon Cain
- Kim Clarke
- Laura Coenen
- Laurie Fellner
- Sam Jones
- Portia Lack
- Dannette Leininger
- Pat Neder
- Karyn Palgut
- Carol Peterka
- Angie Raynor
- Barbara Schaaf
- Cindy Stinger
