= Handball at the 1988 Summer Olympics – Women's team squads =

List of handball players

The following squads and players competed in the women's handball tournament at the 1988 Summer Olympics.

== China ==
The following players represented China:

- Chen Zhen
- Dai Jianfen
- He Jianping
- Li Jie
- Li Lirong
- Lu Guanghong
- Sun Xiulan
- Wang Mingxing
- Wang Tao
- Xue Jinhua
- Zhang Hong
- Zhang Weihong

== Czechoslovakia ==
The following players represented Czechoslovakia:

- Alena Damitšová
- Anna Hradská
- Božena Mažgutová
- Daniela Trandžíková-Nováková
- Gabriela Sabadošová
- Irena Tomašovičová
- Jana Stašová
- Júlia Kolečániová
- Lenka Pospíšilová
- Mária Ďurišinová
- Marie Šmídová
- Marta Pösová
- Monika Hejtmánková
- Petra Lupačová
- Zuzana Budayová

== Ivory Coast ==
The following players represented the Ivory Coast:

- Adjoua N'Dri
- Alimata Douamba
- Brigitte Guigui
- Clementine Blé
- Dounbia Bah
- Elisabeth Kouassi
- Emilie Djoman
- Gouna Irie
- Hortense Konan
- Julienne Vodoungbo
- Koko Elleingand
- Mahoula Kramou
- Wandou Guehi
- Zomou Awa

== Norway ==
The following players represented Norway:

- Kjerstin Andersen
- Berit Digre
- Marte Eliasson
- Susann Goksør
- Trine Haltvik
- Hanne Hegh
- Hanne Hogness
- Vibeke Johnsen
- Kristin Midthun
- Karin Pettersen
- Karin Singstad
- Annette Skotvoll
- Ingrid Steen
- Heidi Sundal
- Cathrine Svendsen

== South Korea ==
The following players represented South Korea:

- Han Hyun-sook
- Ki Mi-sook
- Kim Choon-rye
- Kim Hyun-mee
- Kim Kyung-soon
- Kim Myung-soon
- Lee Ki-soon
- Lim Mi-kyung
- Shon Mi-Na
- Song Ji-hyun
- Suk Min-hee
- Sung Kyung-hwa

== Soviet Union ==
The following players represented the Soviet Union:

- Natalya Anisimova
- Maryna Bazhanova
- Tatyana Dzhandzhgava
- Elina Guseva
- Tetyana Horb
- Larysa Karlova
- Natalya Lapitskaya
- Svitlana Mankova
- Nataliya Matryuk
- Natalya Morskova
- Olena Nemashkalo
- Nataliya Rusnachenko
- Olha Semenova
- Yevheniya Tovstohan
- Zinaida Turchyna

== United States ==
The following players represented the United States:

- Kathy Callaghan
- Kim Clarke
- Laura Coenen
- Sandra DeLaRiva
- Megan Gallagher
- Amy Gamble
- Sam Jones
- Portia Lack
- Karyn Palgut
- Carol Peterka
- Angie Raynor
- Cindy Stinger
- Penny Stone
- Sherry Winn

== Yugoslavia ==
The following players represented Yugoslavia:

- Desanka Stojanović
- Dragana Pešić
- Dragica Đurić
- Ljiljana Marković
- Ljiljana Mugoša
- Ljubinka Janković
- Mirjana Đurica
- Mirjana Krstić
- Nataša Kolega
- Slavica Djukić
- Slavica Rinčić
- Svetlana Mičić
- Svetlana Mugoša-Antić
- Svetlana Anastasovski-Obućina
- Zita Galic
