= Nigeria at the 1992 Summer Olympics =

- IOC code: NGR
- NOC: Nigeria Olympic Committee

in Barcelona
- Competitors: 55 (32 men and 23 women) in 8 sports
- Medals Ranked 38th: Gold 0 Silver 3 Bronze 1 Total 4

Summer Olympics appearances (overview)
- 1952; 1956; 1960; 1964; 1968; 1972; 1976; 1980; 1984; 1988; 1992; 1996; 2000; 2004; 2008; 2012; 2016; 2020; 2024

Nigeria competed at the 1992 Summer Olympics in Barcelona, Spain.

== Medalists ==
Medal	Name	Sport	Event	Date
Silver	David Izonritei	Boxing	Heavyweight	8 August
Silver	Olapade Adeniken; Davidson Ezinwa; Osmond Ezinwa; Chidi Imoh; Oluyemi Kayode	Athletics	Men's 4 × 100 metres relay	8 August
Silver	Richard Igbineghu	Boxing	Super heavyweight	9 August
Bronze	Faith Idehen; Mary Onyali; Christy Opara-Thompson; Beatrice Utondu	Athletics	Women's 4 × 100 metres relay	8 August

== Competitors ==
The following is the list of number of competitors in the Games.

Sport	Men	Women	Total
Athletics	10	4	14
Boxing	9	–	9
Handball	0	16	16
Judo	2	0	2
Swimming	1	1	2
Table tennis	4	2	6
Weightlifting	1	–	1
Wrestling	5	–	5
Total	32	23	55

== Athletics ==
Men
Track and road events

Athlete	Event	Heats		Quarterfinal		Semifinal		Final	
Athlete	Event	Result	Rank	Result	Rank	Result	Rank	Result	Rank
Olapade Adeniken	100 metres	10.36	8 Q	10.22	6 Q	10.28	7 Q	10.12	6
Davidson Ezinwa	100 metres	10.31	7 Q	10.38	16 Q	10.23	6 Q	10.26	8
Chidi Imoh	100 metres	10.47	15 Q	10.21	5 Q	10.30	9	Did not advance	
Olapade Adeniken	200 metres	20.79	8 Q	20.47	8 Q	20.39	7 Q	20.50	5
Oluyemi Kayode	200 metres	20.42	2 Q	20.22	3 Q	20.23	5 Q	20.67	7
Sunday Bada	400 metres	45.38	5 Q	45.34	12 Q	45.36	10	Did not advance	
Innocent Egbunike	400 metres	46.51	35	Did not advance					
Oluyemi Kayode; Chidi Imoh; Olapade Adeniken; Davidson Ezinwa; Osmond Ezinwa (heats only)	4 × 100 metres relay	38.98	3 Q	—N/a		38.21	2 Q	37.98	2nd place, silver medalist(s)
Udeme Ekpenyong; Emmanuel Okoli; Hassan Bosso; Sunday Bada	4 × 400 metres relay	3:00.39	4 q	—N/a				3:01.71	5

Women
Track and road events

Athlete	Event	Heats		Quarterfinal		Semifinal		Final	
Athlete	Event	Result	Rank	Result	Rank	Result	Rank	Result	Rank
Mary Onyali	100 metres	11.37	8 Q	11.28	8 Q	11.30	8 Q	11.15	7
Christy Opara-Thompson	100 metres	11.39	9 Q	11.42	12 Q	11.47	13	Did not advance	
Beatrice Utondu	100 metres	11.30	6 Q	11.31	9 Q	11.53	14	Did not advance	
Mary Onyali	200 metres	23.06	9 Q	22.60	11 Q	22.60	9	Did not advance	
Beatrice Utondu; Faith Idehen; Christy Opara-Thompson; Mary Onyali	4 × 100 metres relay	42.39	2 Q	—N/a				42.81	3rd place, bronze medalist(s)

== Boxing ==
Athlete	Event	Round of 32	Round of 16	Quarterfinals	Semifinals	Final	
Athlete	Event	Opposition Result	Opposition Result	Opposition Result	Opposition Result	Opposition Result	Rank
Moses Malagu	Flyweight	Buttimer (IRL); W 12–8	González (CUB); L RSC R2	Did not advance			
Mohammed Sabo	Bantamweight	Ciba (POL); W RSC R3	Suwanyod (THA); W 16–7	McCullough (IRL); L 13–31	Did not advance		
Moses Odion	Lightweight	Petrovics (HUN); W 18–8	De La Hoya (USA); L 4–16	Did not advance			
Moses James	Light welterweight	Chavez (PHI); L 6–12	Did not advance				
Tajudeen Sabitu	Welterweight	Vaștag (ROU); L 0–9	Did not advance				
David Defiagbon	Light middleweight	Márquez (USA); L 7–8	Did not advance				
Jacklord Jacobs	Light heavyweight	Bye	Zaulychnyi (EUN); L 8–16	Did not advance			
David Izonritei	Heavyweight	Bye	Shiri (IRI); W RSC R3	Johnson (CAN); W 9–5	Tua (NZL); W 12–7	Savón (CUB); L 1–14	2nd place, silver medalist(s)
Richard Igbineghu	Super heavyweight	Bye	Al-Hassan (GHA); W w/o	Juškevičius (LTU); W KO	Rusinov (BUL); W 9–7	Balado (CUB); L 2–13	2nd place, silver medalist(s)

== Handball ==
Summary

Key:

- ET: After extra time
- P – Match decided by penalty-shootout.

Team	Event	Group stage						Semifinal	Final / BM	
Team	Event	Opposition Score	Opposition Score	Opposition Score	Opposition Score	Opposition Score	Rank	Opposition Score	Opposition Score	Rank
Nigeria women's	Women's tournament	Germany; L 17–32	Unified Team; L 18–26	United States; L 21–23	—N/a		4	—N/a	Spain; L 17–26	8

=== Women's tournament ===
Team roster

- Agustina Nkechi Abi
- Angela Ajodo
- Barbara Diribe
- Bridget Yamala Egwolosan
- Chiaka Lauretta Ihebom
- Eunice Idausa
- Immaculate Nwaogu
- Justina Akpulo
- Justina Anyiam
- Mary Ihedioha
- Mary Nwachukwu
- Mary Soronadi
- Ngozi Opara
- Auta Olivia Sana
- Uzoma Azuka
- Victoria Umunna

Group play

Pos	Team	Pld	W	D	L	GF	GA	GD	Pts	Qualification
1	Unified Team	3	3	0	0	77	56	+21	6	Semifinals
2	Germany	3	2	0	1	86	61	+25	4	Semifinals
3	United States	3	1	0	2	55	76	−21	2	Fifth place game
4	Nigeria	3	0	0	3	56	81	−25	0	Seventh place game

30 July 1992; 10:00	Germany	32–17	Nigeria	Palau d'Esports de Granollers, Granollers; Referees: Øie, Høgsnes (NOR)
30 July 1992; 10:00	Mühlner 9	(14–9)	Sana 7	Palau d'Esports de Granollers, Granollers; Referees: Øie, Høgsnes (NOR)

1 August 1992; 10:00	Nigeria	18–26	Unified Team	Palau d'Esports de Granollers, Granollers; Referees: Goto, Shimada (JPN)
1 August 1992; 10:00	Sana 8	(5–15)	Horb, Morskova 5	Palau d'Esports de Granollers, Granollers; Referees: Goto, Shimada (JPN)

3 August 1992; 10:00	United States	23–21	Nigeria	Palau d'Esports de Granollers, Granollers; Referees: Christensen, Jørgensen (DEN)
3 August 1992; 10:00	Jones 8	(12–9)	Abi 10	Palau d'Esports de Granollers, Granollers; Referees: Christensen, Jørgensen (DEN)

Seventh place game

7 August 1992; 09:00	Spain	26–17	Nigeria	Palau d'Esports de Granollers, Granollers; Referees: Goto, Shimada (JPN)
7 August 1992; 09:00	Gómez 7	(14–5)	Abi, Anyiam 4	Palau d'Esports de Granollers, Granollers; Referees: Goto, Shimada (JPN)

== Judo ==
Men

Athlete	Event	Round of 64	Round of 32	Round of 16	Quarterfinals	Semifinals	Repechage			Final	
Athlete	Event	Round of 64	Round of 32	Round of 16	Quarterfinals	Semifinals	Round 1	Round 2	Round 3	Final	
Athlete	Event	Opposition Result	Opposition Result	Opposition Result	Opposition Result	Opposition Result	Opposition Result	Opposition Result	Opposition Result	Opposition Result	Rank
Majemite Omagbaluwaje	71 kg	Sulli (ITA); L	Did not advance								
Suleman Musa	78 kg	Bye	Adolfsson (SWE); L	Did not advance			Dorjbat (MGL); L	Did not advance			

== Swimming ==
Men

Athlete	Event	Heats		Final A/B	
Athlete	Event	Time	Rank	Time	Rank
Musa Bakare	50 metre freestyle	24.13	41	Did not advance	
Musa Bakare	100 metre butterfly	58.36	52	Did not advance	

Women

Athlete	Event	Heats		Final A/B	
Athlete	Event	Time	Rank	Time	Rank
Joshua Ikhaghomi	50 metre freestyle	27.53	39	Did not advance	
Joshua Ikhaghomi	100 metre freestyle	1:00.72	42	Did not advance	

== Table tennis ==
Men

Athlete	Event	Group Stage				Round of 16	Quarterfinal	Semifinal	Final	
Athlete	Event	Opposition Result	Opposition Result	Opposition Result	Rank	Opposition Result	Opposition Result	Opposition Result	Opposition Result	Rank
Yomi Bankole	Singles	Matsushita (JPN); L 0–2	Wang (CHN); L 0–2	Hamdan (KSA); W 2–1	3	Did not advance				
Atanda Musa	Singles	Kalinić (IOP); L 0–2	Gatien (FRA); L 0–2	Bower (NZL); W 2–0	3	Did not advance				
Sule Olaleye	Singles	Lupulesku (IOP); L 1–2	Ri (PRK); L 1–2	El-Mahjoub (LBA); W 2–0	3	Did not advance				
Yomi Bankole; Segun Toriola	Doubles	Cooke / Prean (GBR); L 0–2	Yu / Ma (CHN); L 1–2	Arado / Roque (CUB); W 2–0	3	Did not advance				
Sule Olaleye; Atanda Musa	Doubles	Grubba / Kucharski (POL); L 0–2	Éloi / Gatien (FRA); L 0–2	Jackson / Bower (NZL); W 2–0	3	Did not advance				

Women

Athlete	Event	Group Stage				Round of 16	Quarterfinal	Semifinal	Final	
Athlete	Event	Opposition Result	Opposition Result	Opposition Result	Rank	Opposition Result	Opposition Result	Opposition Result	Opposition Result	Rank
Bose Kaffo	Singles	Gergelcheva (BUL); L 0–2	Vriesekoop (NED); L 0–2	Doti (BRA); W 2–1	3	Did not advance				
Abiola Odumosu	Singles	Yamashita (JPN); L 0–2	Timina (EUN); L 0–2	González (PER); L 0–2	4	Did not advance				
Abiola Odumosu; Bose Kaffo	Doubles	Wi / Kim (PRK); L 0–2	Palina / Timina (EUN); L 0–2	Godes / Gauchia (ESP); W 2–0	3	Did not advance				

== Weightlifting ==
Athlete	Event	Snatch		Clean & jerk		Total	Rank
Athlete	Event	Result	Rank	Result	Rank	Total	Rank
Gilbert Ojadi Aduche	+110 kg	180.0	4	DNF			

== Wrestling ==
Freestyle

Athlete	Event	Group Stage						Final	
Athlete	Event	Opposition Result	Opposition Result	Opposition Result	Opposition Result	Opposition Result	Rank	Opposition Result	Rank
Amos Ojo	48 kg	Petryshen (CAN); L 4–7	Khosbayar (MGL); L Fall	Did not advance			8	Did not advance	
Joe Oziti	52 kg	Ri (PRK); L 0–15	Yordanov (BUL); L Fall	Did not advance			7	Did not advance	
Tebe Dorgu	57 kg	Nagy (HUN); L Fall	Scheibe (GER); L Fall	Did not advance			9	Did not advance	
Ibo Oziti	68 kg	Özbaş (TUR); L 2–4	McNeil (GBR); W 4–0	Saunders (USA); L Fall	Did not advance		6	Did not advance	
Enekpedekumoh Okporu	82 kg	Dvorák (HUN); L 0–2	Sofiadi (BUL); L 1–4	Did not advance			8	Did not advance	

== See also ==
- Nigeria at the 1990 Commonwealth Games
- Nigeria at the 1994 Commonwealth Games
