= Ivory Coast at the 1988 Summer Olympics =

- Flag of Ivory Coast
- IOC code: CIV
- NOC: Comité National Olympique de Côte d'Ivoire

in Seoul
- Competitors: 28 in 5 sports
- Flag bearer: René Djédjémél
- Medals: Gold 0 Silver 0 Bronze 0 Total 0

Summer Olympics appearances (overview)
- 1964; 1968; 1972; 1976; 1980; 1984; 1988; 1992; 1996; 2000; 2004; 2008; 2012; 2016; 2020; 2024

Ivory Coast competed at the 1988 Summer Olympics in Seoul, South Korea.

== Competitors ==
The following is the list of number of competitors in the Games.

Sport	Men	Women	Total
Athletics	6	3	9
Boxing	2	–	2
Canoeing	2	0	2
Handball	0	14	14
Tennis	1	0	1
Total	11	17	28

== Athletics ==
Men
Track and road events

Athlete	Event	Heat Round 1		Heat Round 2		Semifinal		Final	
Athlete	Event	Time	Rank	Time	Rank	Time	Rank	Time	Rank
Gabriel Tiacoh	400 metres	47.19	31 Q	45.49	20	Did not advance			
Akissi Kpidi; René Djédjémel; Djétenan Kouadio; Gabriel Tiacoh; Anatole Zongo Kuyo (*); Lancine Fofana (*)	4 × 400 metres relay	3:07.40	12 q	—		3:07.15	12	Did not advance	

Women
Track and road events

Athlete	Event	Heat Round 1		Heat Round 2		Semifinal		Final	
Athlete	Event	Time	Rank	Time	Rank	Time	Rank	Time	Rank
Céléstine N'Drin	400 metres	52.48	12 Q	52.04	19	Did not advance			
Marie Womplou	400 metres hurdles	57.35	25	—		Did not advance			

Field events

Athlete	Event	Qualification		Final	
Athlete	Event	Distance	Position	Distance	Position
Lucienne N'Da	High jump	1.75	24	Did not advance	

== Boxing ==
Athlete	Event	Round of 64	Round of 32	Round of 16	Quarterfinals	Semifinals	Final	
Athlete	Event	Opposition Result	Opposition Result	Opposition Result	Opposition Result	Opposition Result	Opposition Result	Rank
Bakary Fofana	Featherweight	Yamada (JPN); L RSC R1	Did not advance					
Kouassi Kouassi	Light welterweight	Matumla (TAN); L RSC R1	Did not advance					

== Canoeing ==
Men

Athlete	Event	Heats		Repechage		Semifinals		Final	
Athlete	Event	Time	Rank	Time	Rank	Time	Rank	Time	Rank
Melagne Lath; Kouame N'Douba	K-2 500 metres	1:47.88	6 R	1:55.65	6	Did not advance			

== Handball ==
Summary

Team	Event	Group stage				Classification round		
Team	Event	Opposition Score	Opposition Score	Opposition Score	Rank	Opposition Score	Opposition Score	Rank
Ivory Coast women's	Women's tournament	Norway; L 14–34	Soviet Union; L 11–32	China; L 12–37	4	Czechoslovakia; L 12–34	United States; L 16–27	8

=== Women's tournament ===
Team roster

- Adjoua N'Dri
- Alimata Douamba
- Brigitte Guigui
- Clementine Blé
- Dounbia Bah
- Elisabeth Kouassi
- Emilie Djoman
- Gouna Irie
- Hortense Konan
- Julienne Vodoungbo
- Koko Elleingand
- Mahoula Kramou
- Wandou Guehi
- Zomou Awa

Group play

Pos	Team	Pld	W	D	L	GF	GA	GD	Pts	Qualification
1	Soviet Union	3	2	1	0	75	49	+26	5 (Note: 25% rule: Soviet Union +5 GD, Norway +2 GD)	Final round
2	Norway	3	2	1	0	75	53	+22	5	Final round
3	China	3	1	0	2	76	58	+18	2	Placement round
4	Ivory Coast	3	0	0	3	37	103	−66	0	Placement round

Notes:

21 September 1988; 19:30	Norway	34–14	Ivory Coast	Suwon Gymnasium, Suwon; Referees: Lee, Park (KOR)
21 September 1988; 19:30	Midthun 7	(15–8)	Kramou 5	Suwon Gymnasium, Suwon; Referees: Lee, Park (KOR)
21 September 1988; 19:30	3× (yellow card) 1× (suspension)		2× (yellow card) 7× (suspension)	Suwon Gymnasium, Suwon; Referees: Lee, Park (KOR)

23 September 1988; 15:30	Soviet Union	32–11	Ivory Coast	Suwon Gymnasium, Suwon; Referees: Zaworotny, Brosio (ARG)
23 September 1988; 15:30	Morskova 8	(14–7)	Kramou 4	Suwon Gymnasium, Suwon; Referees: Zaworotny, Brosio (ARG)
23 September 1988; 15:30	1× (yellow card) 2× (suspension)		2× (yellow card) 7× (suspension)	Suwon Gymnasium, Suwon; Referees: Zaworotny, Brosio (ARG)

25 September 1988; 15:30	China	37–12	Ivory Coast	Suwon Gymnasium, Suwon; Referees: Lelong, Tancrez (FRA)
25 September 1988; 15:30	Sun 10	(20–4)	Djoman 3	Suwon Gymnasium, Suwon; Referees: Lelong, Tancrez (FRA)
25 September 1988; 15:30	2× (yellow card)		3× (yellow card)	Suwon Gymnasium, Suwon; Referees: Lelong, Tancrez (FRA)

Classification round

Pos	Team	Pld	W	D	L	GF	GA	GD	Pts
5	Czechoslovakia	3	3	0	0	93	52	+41	6
6	China	3	2	0	1	89	60	+29	4
7	United States	3	1	0	2	68	80	−12	2
8	Ivory Coast	3	0	0	3	40	98	−58	0

27 September 1988; 15:30	Ivory Coast	12–34	Czechoslovakia	Suwon Gymnasium, Suwon; Referees: Kim, Park (KOR)
27 September 1988; 15:30	Kramou 5	(5–16)	Hejtmánková 7	Suwon Gymnasium, Suwon; Referees: Kim, Park (KOR)
27 September 1988; 15:30	3× (yellow card) 3× (suspension)		3× (yellow card) 2× (suspension)	Suwon Gymnasium, Suwon; Referees: Kim, Park (KOR)

29 September 1988; 14:00	Ivory Coast	16–27	United States	Suwon Gymnasium, Suwon; Referees: Lee, Park (KOR)
29 September 1988; 14:00	Bah, Kramou 5	(6–14)	three players 4	Suwon Gymnasium, Suwon; Referees: Lee, Park (KOR)
29 September 1988; 14:00	2× (yellow card) 4× (suspension)		1× (yellow card) 2× (suspension)	Suwon Gymnasium, Suwon; Referees: Lee, Park (KOR)

== Tennis ==
Men

Athlete	Event	Round of 64	Round of 32	Round of 16	Quarterfinals	Semifinals	Final	
Athlete	Event	Opposition Result	Opposition Result	Opposition Result	Opposition Result	Opposition Result	Opposition Result	Rank
Clément N'Goran	Singles	Castle (GBR); L (7–6, 6–3, 2–6, 6–7, 5–7)	Did not advance					
