= Handball at the 1988 Summer Olympics – Women's tournament =

Handball at the Olympics

1988 Women's Olympic handball tournament
Tournament details
- Host country: South Korea
- Venue: 1 (in 1 host city)
- Dates: 21–29 September 1988
- Teams: 8

Final positions
- Champions: South Korea (1st title)
- Runners-up: Norway
- Third place: Soviet Union
- Fourth place: Yugoslavia

Tournament statistics
- Matches played: 20
- Goals scored: 873 (43.65 per match)
- Top scorers: (China) Sun Xiulan (36 goals)

The women's tournament was one of two handball tournaments at the 1988 Summer Olympics. It was the fourth appearance of a women's handball tournament at the Olympic Games. South Korea took the gold medals for the first time, ahead of Norway and the Soviet Union.

== Qualification ==
Mean of qualification	Date	Host	Vacancies	Qualified
Host nation	30 September 1981	(West Germany) Baden-Baden	1	South Korea
1986 World Championship	4–14 December 1986	Netherlands	3	Soviet Union; Czechoslovakia; Norway
1987 African Championship	July 1987	(Morocco) Rabat	1	Ivory Coast
1987 Pan American Games	9–16 August 1987	(United States) Indianapolis	1	United States
1987 Asian Championship	20–27 August 1987	(Jordan) Amman	1	China
1987 World Championship Group B	9–18 December 1987	Bulgaria	1	Yugoslavia
Total			8	

== Preliminary round ==
=== Group A ===
Pos	Team	Pld	W	D	L	GF	GA	GD	Pts	Qualification
1	South Korea (H)	3	2	0	1	76	67	+9	4 (Note: 25% rule: South Korea +3 GD, Yugoslavia –1 GD, Czechoslovakia –2 GD)	Final round
2	Yugoslavia	3	2	0	1	58	58	0	4	Final round
3	Czechoslovakia	3	2	0	1	81	69	+12	4	Placement round
4	United States	3	0	0	3	55	76	−21	0	Placement round

(H) Hosts
Notes:

21 September 1988; 14:00	Czechoslovakia	27–33	South Korea	Suwon Gymnasium, Suwon; Referees: Lelong, Tancrez (FRA)
21 September 1988; 14:00	Hejtmánková, Lupačová 6	(9–15)	Kim H. 8	Suwon Gymnasium, Suwon; Referees: Lelong, Tancrez (FRA)
21 September 1988; 14:00	2× (yellow card) 5× (suspension) 1× (red card)		2× (yellow card) 3× (suspension)	Suwon Gymnasium, Suwon; Referees: Lelong, Tancrez (FRA)

21 September 1988; 18:00	Yugoslavia	19–18	United States	Suwon Gymnasium, Suwon; Referees: Marin, Şerban (ROU)
21 September 1988; 18:00	Galic, S. Mugoša 5	(10–8)	Jones 9	Suwon Gymnasium, Suwon; Referees: Marin, Şerban (ROU)
21 September 1988; 18:00	2× (yellow card) 3× (suspension)		2× (yellow card) 3× (suspension)	Suwon Gymnasium, Suwon; Referees: Marin, Şerban (ROU)

23 September 1988; 14:00	Czechoslovakia	33–19	United States	Suwon Gymnasium, Suwon; Referees: Christensen, Jørgensen (DEN)
23 September 1988; 14:00	Damitšová 8	(13–11)	Jones 10	Suwon Gymnasium, Suwon; Referees: Christensen, Jørgensen (DEN)
23 September 1988; 14:00	1× (yellow card) 3× (suspension)		1× (yellow card) 6× (suspension)	Suwon Gymnasium, Suwon; Referees: Christensen, Jørgensen (DEN)

23 September 1988; 18:00	Yugoslavia	22–19	South Korea	Suwon Gymnasium, Suwon; Referees: Guterman, Taranuhin (URS)
23 September 1988; 18:00	Kolega 6	(10–13)	Kim C. 6	Suwon Gymnasium, Suwon; Referees: Guterman, Taranuhin (URS)
23 September 1988; 18:00	1× (yellow card) 3× (suspension)		2× (suspension)	Suwon Gymnasium, Suwon; Referees: Guterman, Taranuhin (URS)

25 September 1988; 14:00	South Korea	24–18	United States	Suwon Gymnasium, Suwon; Referees: Blademo, Wester (SWE)
25 September 1988; 14:00	Kim C. 7	(11–10)	Jones 6	Suwon Gymnasium, Suwon; Referees: Blademo, Wester (SWE)
25 September 1988; 14:00	2× (yellow card) 4× (suspension)		2× (yellow card) 3× (suspension)	Suwon Gymnasium, Suwon; Referees: Blademo, Wester (SWE)

25 September 1988; 18:00	Czechoslovakia	21–17	Yugoslavia	Suwon Gymnasium, Suwon; Referees: Ludvigsen, Sjong (NOR)
25 September 1988; 18:00	Ďurišinová 9	(8–7)	Galic 4	Suwon Gymnasium, Suwon; Referees: Ludvigsen, Sjong (NOR)
25 September 1988; 18:00	2× (yellow card) 6× (suspension)		1× (yellow card) 7× (suspension) 1× (red card)	Suwon Gymnasium, Suwon; Referees: Ludvigsen, Sjong (NOR)

=== Group B ===
Pos	Team	Pld	W	D	L	GF	GA	GD	Pts	Qualification
1	Soviet Union	3	2	1	0	75	49	+26	5 (Note: 25% rule: Soviet Union +5 GD, Norway +2 GD)	Final round
2	Norway	3	2	1	0	75	53	+22	5	Final round
3	China	3	1	0	2	76	58	+18	2	Placement round
4	Ivory Coast	3	0	0	3	37	103	−66	0	Placement round

Notes:

21 September 1988; 15:30	Soviet Union	24–19	China	Suwon Gymnasium, Suwon; Referees: Jug, Jeglič (YUG)
21 September 1988; 15:30	Tovstohan 5	(12–9)	Sun 8	Suwon Gymnasium, Suwon; Referees: Jug, Jeglič (YUG)
21 September 1988; 15:30	3× (yellow card) 4× (suspension)		3× (yellow card) 1× (suspension)	Suwon Gymnasium, Suwon; Referees: Jug, Jeglič (YUG)

21 September 1988; 19:30	Norway	34–14	Ivory Coast	Suwon Gymnasium, Suwon; Referees: Lee, Park (KOR)
21 September 1988; 19:30	Midthun 7	(15–8)	Kramou 5	Suwon Gymnasium, Suwon; Referees: Lee, Park (KOR)
21 September 1988; 19:30	3× (yellow card) 1× (suspension)		2× (yellow card) 7× (suspension)	Suwon Gymnasium, Suwon; Referees: Lee, Park (KOR)

23 September 1988; 15:30	Soviet Union	32–11	Ivory Coast	Suwon Gymnasium, Suwon; Referees: Zaworotny, Brosio (ARG)
23 September 1988; 15:30	Morskova 8	(14–7)	Kramou 4	Suwon Gymnasium, Suwon; Referees: Zaworotny, Brosio (ARG)
23 September 1988; 15:30	1× (yellow card) 2× (suspension)		2× (yellow card) 7× (suspension)	Suwon Gymnasium, Suwon; Referees: Zaworotny, Brosio (ARG)

23 September 1988; 19:30	Norway	22–20	China	Suwon Gymnasium, Suwon; Referees: Hofmann, Prause (FRG)
23 September 1988; 19:30	Steen 6	(12–10)	Chen, Sun 4	Suwon Gymnasium, Suwon; Referees: Hofmann, Prause (FRG)
23 September 1988; 19:30	2× (yellow card) 2× (suspension)		1× (yellow card) 2× (suspension)	Suwon Gymnasium, Suwon; Referees: Hofmann, Prause (FRG)

25 September 1988; 15:30	China	37–12	Ivory Coast	Suwon Gymnasium, Suwon; Referees: Lelong, Tancrez (FRA)
25 September 1988; 15:30	Sun 10	(20–4)	Djoman 3	Suwon Gymnasium, Suwon; Referees: Lelong, Tancrez (FRA)
25 September 1988; 15:30	2× (yellow card)		3× (yellow card)	Suwon Gymnasium, Suwon; Referees: Lelong, Tancrez (FRA)

25 September 1988; 19:30	Soviet Union	19–19	Norway	Suwon Gymnasium, Suwon; Referees: Rauchfuß, Buchda (GDR)
25 September 1988; 19:30	Lapitskaya 5	(13–10)	Svendsen 5	Suwon Gymnasium, Suwon; Referees: Rauchfuß, Buchda (GDR)
25 September 1988; 19:30	3× (yellow card) 4× (suspension) 1× (red card)		3× (yellow card) 2× (suspension)	Suwon Gymnasium, Suwon; Referees: Rauchfuß, Buchda (GDR)

== Placement round ==
Pos	Team	Pld	W	D	L	GF	GA	GD	Pts
5	Czechoslovakia	3	3	0	0	93	52	+41	6
6	China	3	2	0	1	89	60	+29	4
7	United States	3	1	0	2	68	80	−12	2
8	Ivory Coast	3	0	0	3	40	98	−58	0

27 September 1988; 14:00	China	31–22	United States	Suwon Gymnasium, Suwon; Referees: Haak, Koppe (NED)
27 September 1988; 14:00	Sun 10	(12–13)	Jones 6	Suwon Gymnasium, Suwon; Referees: Haak, Koppe (NED)
27 September 1988; 14:00	3× (yellow card) 3× (suspension)		3× (yellow card) 2× (suspension)	Suwon Gymnasium, Suwon; Referees: Haak, Koppe (NED)

27 September 1988; 15:30	Ivory Coast	12–34	Czechoslovakia	Suwon Gymnasium, Suwon; Referees: Kim, Park (KOR)
27 September 1988; 15:30	Kramou 5	(5–16)	Hejtmánková 7	Suwon Gymnasium, Suwon; Referees: Kim, Park (KOR)
27 September 1988; 15:30	3× (yellow card) 3× (suspension)		3× (yellow card) 2× (suspension)	Suwon Gymnasium, Suwon; Referees: Kim, Park (KOR)

29 September 1988; 14:00	Ivory Coast	16–27	United States	Suwon Gymnasium, Suwon; Referees: Lee, Park (KOR)
29 September 1988; 14:00	Bah, Kramou 5	(6–14)	three players 4	Suwon Gymnasium, Suwon; Referees: Lee, Park (KOR)
29 September 1988; 14:00	2× (yellow card) 4× (suspension)		1× (yellow card) 2× (suspension)	Suwon Gymnasium, Suwon; Referees: Lee, Park (KOR)

29 September 1988; 15:30	China	21–26	Czechoslovakia	Suwon Gymnasium, Suwon; Referees: Blademo, Wester (SWE)
29 September 1988; 15:30	Chen 7	(10–9)	Budayová, Ďurišinová 6	Suwon Gymnasium, Suwon; Referees: Blademo, Wester (SWE)
29 September 1988; 15:30	2× (yellow card) 3× (suspension)		2× (yellow card) 3× (suspension)	Suwon Gymnasium, Suwon; Referees: Blademo, Wester (SWE)

== Final round ==
Pos	Team	Pld	W	D	L	GF	GA	GD	Pts
1st place, gold medalist(s)	South Korea (H)	3	2	0	1	63	61	+2	4
2nd place, silver medalist(s)	Norway	3	1	1	1	59	57	+2	3 (Note: 25% rule: Norway +2 GD, Soviet Union +1 GD)
3rd place, bronze medalist(s)	Soviet Union	3	1	1	1	56	55	+1	3
4	Yugoslavia	3	1	0	2	52	57	−5	2

(H) Hosts
Notes:

27 September 1988; 18:00	Yugoslavia	15–18	Soviet Union	Suwon Gymnasium, Suwon; Referees: Christensen, Jørgensen (DEN)
27 September 1988; 18:00	Galic 5	(8–9)	Morskova 6	Suwon Gymnasium, Suwon; Referees: Christensen, Jørgensen (DEN)
27 September 1988; 18:00	2× (yellow card) 5× (suspension)		1× (yellow card) 4× (suspension)	Suwon Gymnasium, Suwon; Referees: Christensen, Jørgensen (DEN)

27 September 1988; 19:30	South Korea	23–20	Norway	Suwon Gymnasium, Suwon; Referees: Hofmann, Prause (FRG)
27 September 1988; 19:30	Kim H., Kim M. 5	(10–9)	Sundal 6	Suwon Gymnasium, Suwon; Referees: Hofmann, Prause (FRG)
27 September 1988; 19:30	2× (yellow card) 3× (suspension)		2× (yellow card) 2× (suspension)	Suwon Gymnasium, Suwon; Referees: Hofmann, Prause (FRG)

29 September 1988; 18:00	Yugoslavia	15–20	Norway	Suwon Gymnasium, Suwon; Referees: Marin, Şerban (ROU)
29 September 1988; 18:00	Galic, S. Mugoša 3	(10–9)	Steen 5	Suwon Gymnasium, Suwon; Referees: Marin, Şerban (ROU)
29 September 1988; 18:00	3× (yellow card) 5× (suspension)		2× (yellow card) 6× (suspension)	Suwon Gymnasium, Suwon; Referees: Marin, Şerban (ROU)

29 September 1988; 19:30	South Korea	21–19	Soviet Union	Suwon Gymnasium, Suwon; Referees: Rauchfuß, Buchda (GDR)
29 September 1988; 19:30	Lim 6	(13–11)	Morskova 7	Suwon Gymnasium, Suwon; Referees: Rauchfuß, Buchda (GDR)
29 September 1988; 19:30	2× (yellow card) 2× (suspension)		1× (yellow card) 3× (suspension)	Suwon Gymnasium, Suwon; Referees: Rauchfuß, Buchda (GDR)

== Final ranking ==
Rank	Team
1st place, gold medalist(s)	South Korea
2nd place, silver medalist(s)	Norway
3rd place, bronze medalist(s)	Soviet Union
4	Yugoslavia
5	Czechoslovakia
6	China
7	United States
8	Ivory Coast
