= South Korea at the 1992 Summer Olympics =

- IOC code: KOR
- NOC: Korean Olympic Committee
- Website: www.sports.or.kr (in Korean and English)

in Barcelona
- Competitors: 226 (154 men, 72 women) in 24 sports
- Flag bearer: Kim Tae-hyun
- Medals Ranked 7th: Gold 12 Silver 5 Bronze 12 Total 29

Summer Olympics appearances (overview)
- 1948; 1952; 1956; 1960; 1964; 1968; 1972; 1976; 1980; 1984; 1988; 1992; 1996; 2000; 2004; 2008; 2012; 2016; 2020; 2024; 2028

South Korea, the previous host of the 1988 Summer Olympics in Seoul, competed as Korea at the 1992 Summer Olympics in Barcelona, Spain. 226 competitors, 154 men and 72 women, took part in 134 events in 24 sports.

== Medalists ==
Medal	Name	Sport	Event	Date
Gold	Yeo Kab-soon	Shooting	Women's 10 metre air rifle	26 July
Gold	Chun Byung-kwan	Weightlifting	Men's 56 kg	27 July
Gold	Kim Mi-jung	Judo	Women's 72 kg	28 July
Gold	Lee Eun-chul	Shooting	Men's 50 metre rifle prone	29 July
Gold	An Han-bong	Wrestling	Men's Greco-Roman 57 kg	30 July
Gold	Cho Youn-jeong	Archery	Women's individual	2 August
Gold	Cho Youn-jeong; Kim Soo-nyung; Lee Eun-kyung	Archery	Women's team	4 August
Gold	Kim Moon-soo; Park Joo-bong	Badminton	Men's doubles	4 August
Gold	Hwang Hye-young; Chung So-young	Badminton	Women's doubles	4 August
Gold	Park Jang-soon	Wrestling	Men's freestyle 74 kg	6 August
Gold typo	Nam Eun-young; Lee Ho-youn; Kim Hwa-sook; Moon Hyang-ja; Min Hye-sook; Cha Jae-kyung; Hong Jeong-ho; Park Jeong-lim; Park Kap-sook; Lee Mi-young; Lim O-kyeong; Jang Ri-ra; Oh Sung-ok; Han Hyun-sook; Han Sun-hee	Handball	Women's tournament	8 August
Gold	Hwang Young-cho	Athletics	Men's marathon	9 August
Silver	Kim Soo-nyung	Archery	Women's individual	2 August
Silver	Yoon Hyun	Judo	Men's 60 kg	2 August
Silver	Chung Jae-hun	Archery	Men's individual	3 August
Silver	Bang Soo-hyun	Badminton	Women's singles	4 August
Silver	Kim Jong-shin	Wrestling	Men's freestyle 48 kg	6 August
Bronze	Min Kyung-gab	Wrestling	Men's Greco-Roman 52 kg	28 July
Bronze	Kim Byung-joo	Judo	Men's 78 kg	30 July
Bronze	Chung Hoon	Judo	Men's 71 kg	31 July
Bronze	Yoo Ok-ryul	Gymnastics	Men's vault	2 August
Bronze	Hyun Jung-hwa; Hong Cha-ok	Table tennis	Women's doubles	3 August
Bronze	Gil Young-ah; Shim Eun-jung	Badminton	Women's doubles	4 August
Bronze	Kang Hee-chan; Lee Chul-seung	Table tennis	Men's doubles	4 August
Bronze	Kim Taek-soo; Yoo Nam-kyu	Table tennis	Men's doubles	4 August
Bronze	Hyun Jung-hwa	Table tennis	Women's singles	5 August
Bronze	Kim Taek-soo	Table tennis	Men's singles	6 August
Bronze	Hong Sung-sik	Boxing	Lightweight	8 August
Bronze	Lee Seung-bae	Boxing	Middleweight	8 August

== Competitors ==
The following is the list of number of competitors in the Games.

Sport	Men	Women	Total
Archery	3	3	6
Athletics	9	2	11
Badminton	6	6	12
Boxing	11	–	11
Canoeing	6	0	6
Cycling	4	0	4
Equestrian	4	1	5
Fencing	10	5	15
Field hockey	0	16	16
Football	14	–	14
Gymnastics	6	4	10
Handball	15	13	28
Judo	7	7	14
Modern pentathlon	3	–	3
Rowing	0	2	2
Sailing	3	0	3
Shooting	7	5	12
Swimming	2	2	4
Table tennis	4	4	8
Tennis	2	2	4
Volleyball	12	0	12
Weightlifting	10	–	10
Wrestling	16	–	16
Total	154	72	226

== Archery ==
Korea's fourth appearance in Olympic archery earned them another pair of gold medals and a pair of silver medals. The women continued to dominate the field, though not quite as thoroughly as they had on their home field four years earlier. The individuals went a combined 16-5, while the teams were 5-1.

Women's Individual Competition:

- Cho Youn-jeong — Final (→ Gold Medal), 5-0
- Kim Soo-nyung — Final (→ Silver Medal), 4-1
- Lee Eun-kyung — Round of 16 (→ 14th place), 1-1

Men's Individual Competition:

- Chung Jae-hun — Final (→ Silver Medal (4-1)
- Han Seung-hoon — Round of 16 (→ 15th place), 1-1
- Lim Hee-sik — Round of 32 (→ 20th place), 1-1

Women's Team Competition:

- Cho, Kim, and Lee — Final (→ Gold Medal), 4-0

Men's Team Competition:

- Chung, Han, and Lim — Quarterfinal (→ 5th place), 1-1

== Athletics ==
Men's Marathon

- Hwang Young-cho 2:13.23 (→ Gold Medal)
- Kim Jae-ryong 2:15.01 (→ 10th place)
- Kim Wan-ki — 2:18.32 (→ 28th place)

Men's Javelin Throw

- Kim Ki-hoon

- Qualification — 72.68 m (→ did not advance)

Women's Marathon

- Lee Mi-ok — 2:54.21 (→ 25th place)

== Boxing ==
Men's Light Flyweight (– 48 kg)

- Cho Dong-bum

- First Round – Defeated Luigi Castiglione (ITA), 8:2
- Second Round – Lost to Pál Lakatos (HUN), 15:20

== Cycling ==
Four male cyclists represented South Korea in 1992.

Men's team pursuit

- Ji Seung-hwan
- Kim Yong-gyu
- Park Min-su
- Won Chang-yong

Men's points race

- Park Min-su

== Fencing ==
15 fencers, 10 men and 5 women represented South Korea in 1992.

Men's foil

- Yu Bong-hyeong
- Kim Yeong-ho
- Kim Seung-pyo

Men's team foil

- Kim Yeong-ho, Kim Seung-pyo, Lee Ho-seong, Lee Seung-yong, Yu Bong-hyeong

Men's épée

- Lee Sang-gi
- Jang Tae-seok
- Kim Jeong-gwan

Men's team épée

- Lee Sang-gi, Jang Tae-seok, Kim Jeong-gwan, Gu Gyo-dong, Lee Sang-yeop

Women's foil

- Lee Jeong-sook
- Shin Seong-ja
- Kim Jin-sun

Women's team foil

- Lee Jeong-sook, Shin Seong-ja, Kim Jin-sun, Jang Mi-gyeong, Jeon Mi-gyeong

== Football ==
Korea was represented by the following squad in Barcelona: (1) Kim Bong-soo, (2) Na Seung-hwa, (3) Lee Moon-seok, (4) Han Jung-kook, (5) Kang Chul, (6) Shin Tae-yong, (7) Kim Gwi-hwa, (8) Noh Jung-yoon, (9) Gwak Kyung-keun, (10) Chung Jae-kwon, (11) Seo Jung-won, (12) Cho Jung-hyun, (13) Kim Do-keun, (14) Jung Kwang-seok, (15) Lee Seung-hyup, (16) Cho Jin-ho, (17) Lee Lim-saeng, (18) Lee Jin-hang, (19) Shin Bum-chul, and (20) Lee Woon-jae. Coach: Kim Sam-rak.

== Handball ==
=== Men's team competition ===
- Preliminary round (group A)

- South Korea – Hungary 22-18
- South Korea – Sweden 18-26
- South Korea – Czechoslovakia 20-19
- South Korea – Iceland 24-26
- South Korea – Brazil 30-26

- Classification Match

- 5th/6th place: South Korea – Spain 21-36 (→ Sixth place)

- Team roster

- Back Sang-suh
- Cho Burn-yun
- Cho Chi-hyo
- Cho Young-shin
- Choi Suk-jae
- Jung Kang-wook
- Kang Jae-won
- Lee Ki-ho
- Lee Kyu-chang
- Lee Min-woo
- Lee Sun-soon
- Lim Jin-suk
- Moon Byung-wook
- Park Do-hun
- Shim Jae-hong
- Yoon Kyung-shin

- Head coach: Lee Kvu-jung

=== Women's team competition ===
- Preliminary round (group B)

- South Korea – Norway 27-16
- South Korea – Austria 27-27
- South Korea – Spain 28-18

- Semi Finals

- South Korea – Germany 26-25

- Gold Medal Match

- South Korea – Norway 28-21 (→ Gold Medal)

- Team roster

- Nam Eun-young
- Lee Ho-youn
- Kim Hwa-sook
- Moon Hyang-ja
- Min Hye-sook
- Cha Jae-kyung
- Hong Jeong-ho
- Park Jeong-lim
- Park Kap-sook
- Lee Mi-young
- Lim O-kyeong
- Jang Ri-ra
- Oh Sung-ok

- Head coach: Chung Hyung-kyun

== Modern pentathlon ==
Three male pentathletes represented South Korea in 1992.

Individual

- Lee Yeong-chan
- Kim Myeong-geon
- Kim In-ho

Team

- Lee Yeong-chan
- Kim Myeong-geon
- Kim In-ho

== Shooting ==
Twelve South Korean shooters (seven men and five women) qualified to compete in the following events:

Men

Athlete	Event	Qualification		Final	
Athlete	Event	Points	Rank	Points	Rank
Lee Eun-chul	50 m rifle prone	597	8 Q	702.5 OR	1st place, gold medalist(s)
Lee Eun-chul	50 m rifle 3 positions	1162	11	Did not advance	
Ji Jong-koo	10 m air rifle	586	21	Did not advance	
Park Jong-shin	50 m pistol	547	33	Did not advance	
Park Jong-shin	10 m air pistol	571	33	Did not advance	
Chae Keun-bae	10 m air rifle	590	4 Q	687.8	8
Kim Seon-il	50 m pistol	558	11	Did not advance	
Kim Seon-il	10 m air pistol	581	9	Did not advance	
Cha Young-chul	50 m rifle prone	594	18	Did not advance	
Cha Young-chul	50 m rifle 3 positions	1158	17	Did not advance	

Women

Athlete	Event	Qualification		Final	
Athlete	Event	Points	Rank	Points	Rank
Lee Eun-ju	10 m air rifle	392	8 Q	492.6	6
Bang Hyun-joo	10 m air pistol	377	15	Did not advance	
Bang Hyun-joo	25 m pistol	570	29	Did not advance	
Yeo Kab-soon	10 m air rifle	396 OR	2 Q	498.2 OR	1st place, gold medalist(s)
Kang Myung-a.	50 m rifle 3 positions	571	24	Did not advance	
Lee Sun-bock	10 m air pistol	377	15	Did not advance	

Open

Athlete	Event	Qualification		Final	
Athlete	Event	Points	Rank	Points	Rank
Kim Kun-il	Trap	135	46	Did not advance	
