= Table tennis at the 1992 Summer Olympics – Men's singles =

Table tennis at the Olympics

Table tennis – Men's singles at the Games of the XXV Olympiad
- Venue: Estació del Nord Sports Hall
- Date: 30 July to 6 August 1992
- Competitors: 64 from 37 nations

Medalists
1st place, gold medalist(s)		Jan-Ove Waldner	Sweden
2nd place, silver medalist(s)		Jean-Philippe Gatien	France
3rd place, bronze medalist(s)		Kim Taek-soo	South Korea
3rd place, bronze medalist(s)		Ma Wenge	China

These are the results of the men's singles competition, one of two events for male competitors in table tennis at the 1992 Summer Olympics in Barcelona.

== Group stage ==
=== Group A ===
Rank	Athlete	W	L	GW	GL	PW	PL	FRA	IOP	NGR	NZL
1	Jean-Philippe Gatien (FRA)	3	0	6	0	126	80	X	2–0	2–0	2–0
2	Zoran Kalinić (IOP)	2	1	4	2	115	93	0–2	X	2–0	2–0
3	Atanda Musa (NGR)	1	2	2	4	97	112	0–2	0–2	X	2–0
4	Hagen Bower (NZL)	0	3	0	6	73	126	0–2	0–2	0–2	X

=== Group B ===
Rank	Athlete	W	L	GW	GL	PW	PL	SWE	KOR	EST	TUN
1	Jan-Ove Waldner (SWE)	3	0	6	0	126	76	X	2–0	2–0	2–0
2	Gang Hui-Chan (KOR)	2	1	4	2	115	94	0–2	X	2–0	2–0
3	Igor Solopov (EST)	1	2	2	4	95	108	0–2	0–2	X	2–0
4	Mourad Sta (TUN)	0	3	0	6	68	126	0–2	0–2	0–2	X

=== Group C ===
Rank	Athlete	W	L	GW	GL	PW	PL	SWE	GBR	FRA	EGY
1	Jörgen Persson (SWE)	3	0	6	1	145	116	X	2–0	2–1	2–0
2	Matthew Syed (GBR)	2	1	4	2	123	114	0–2	X	2–0	2–0
3	Nicolas Chatelain (FRA)	1	2	3	4	135	133	1–2	0–2	X	2–0
4	Ashraf Helmy (EGY)	0	3	0	6	86	126	0–2	0–2	0–2	X

=== Group D ===
Rank	Athlete	W	L	GW	GL	PW	PL	POL	BRA	TCH	RSA
1	Andrzej Grubba (POL)	3	0	6	1	141	85	X	2–1	2–0	2–0
2	Cláudio Kano (BRA)	2	1	5	2	128	109	1–2	X	2–0	2–0
3	Roland Vimi (TCH)	1	2	2	4	87	112	0–2	0–2	X	2–0
4	Louis Botha (RSA)	0	3	0	6	76	126	0–2	0–2	0–2	X

=== Group E ===
Rank	Athlete	W	L	GW	GL	PW	PL	GER	EUN	JAM	CAN
1	Jörg Roßkopf (GER)	3	0	6	0	128	77	X	2–0	2–0	2–0
2	Andrei Mazunov (EUN)	2	1	4	2	118	96	0–2	X	2–0	2–0
3	Michael Hyatt (JAM)	1	2	2	4	83	117	0–2	0–2	X	2–0
4	Joe Ng (CAN)	0	3	0	6	88	127	0–2	0–2	0–2	X

=== Group F ===
Rank	Athlete	W	L	GW	GL	PW	PL	BEL	BRA	EUN	IRI
1	Jean-Michel Saive (BEL)	3	0	6	1	145	104	X	2–0	2–1	2–0
2	Hugo Hoyama (BRA)	2	1	4	2	118	103	0–2	X	2–0	2–0
3	Dmitry Mazunov (EUN)	1	2	3	4	114	125	1–2	0–2	X	2–0
4	Ebrahim Alidokht (IRI)	0	3	0	6	81	126	0–2	0–2	0–2	X

=== Group G ===
Rank	Athlete	W	L	GW	GL	PW	PL	CHN	TCH	POL	CHI
1	Ma Wenge (CHN)	3	0	6	1	142	109	X	2–1	2–0	2–0
2	Petr Korbel (TCH)	2	1	5	3	148	133	1–2	X	2–1	2–0
3	Piotr Skierski (POL)	1	2	3	4	113	127	0–2	1–2	X	2–0
4	Augusto Morales (CHI)	0	3	0	6	92	126	0–2	0–2	0–2	X

=== Group H ===
Rank	Athlete	W	L	GW	GL	PW	PL	KOR	IND	CHN	MAR
1	Kim Taek-Soo (KOR)	3	0	6	1	144	100	X	2–1	2–0	2–0
2	Kamlesh Mehta (IND)	2	1	5	3	149	148	1–2	X	2–0	2–1
3	Lü Lin (CHN)	1	2	2	4	107	110	0–2	0–2	X	2–0
4	Abdelhadi Legdali (MAR)	0	3	1	6	102	144	0–2	1–2	0–2	X

=== Group I ===
Rank	Athlete	W	L	GW	GL	PW	PL	PRK	IOP	NGR	LBA
1	Li Gun-Sang (PRK)	3	0	6	1	145	94	X	2–0	2–1	2–0
2	Ilija Lupulesku (IOP)	2	1	4	3	133	116	0–2	X	2–1	2–0
3	Sule Olaleye (NGR)	1	2	4	4	132	160	1–2	1–2	X	2–0
4	Attaher Mohamed El-Mahjoub (LBA)	0	3	0	6	88	128	0–2	0–2	0–2	X

=== Group J ===
Rank	Athlete	W	L	GW	GL	PW	PL	KOR	HKG	USA	CUB
1	Yoo Nam-Kyu (KOR)	3	0	6	2	160	114	X	2–1	2–1	2–0
2	Lo Chuen Tsung (HKG)	2	1	5	2	128	109	1–2	X	2–0	2–0
3	Sean O'Neill (USA)	1	2	3	4	125	126	1–2	0–2	X	2–0
4	Santiago Roque (CUB)	0	3	0	6	62	126	0–2	0–2	0–2	X

=== Group K ===
Rank	Athlete	W	L	GW	GL	PW	PL	CHN	JPN	NGR	KSA
1	Wang Tao (CHN)	3	0	6	1	135	96	X	2–1	2–0	2–0
2	Kōji Matsushita (JPN)	2	1	5	2	130	93	1–2	X	2–0	2–0
3	Yomi Bankole (NGR)	1	2	2	5	105	133	0–2	0–2	X	2–1
4	Raed Hamdan (KSA)	0	3	1	6	92	140	0–2	0–2	1–2	X

=== Group L ===
Rank	Athlete	W	L	GW	GL	PW	PL	CRO	USA	TCH	PER
1	Zoran Primorac (CRO)	3	0	6	0	126	74	X	2–0	2–0	2–0
2	Jim Butler (USA)	2	1	4	3	133	101	0–2	X	2–1	2–0
3	Tomáš Janči (TCH)	1	2	3	4	129	102	0–2	1–2	X	2–0
4	Yair Nathan (PER)	0	3	0	6	15	126	0–2	0–2	0–2	X

=== Group M ===
Rank	Athlete	W	L	GW	GL	PW	PL	NED	SWE	INA	ESP
1	Paul Haldan (NED)	3	0	6	1	138	125	X	2–1	2–0	2–0
2	Mikael Appelgren (SWE)	2	1	5	2	142	120	1–2	X	2–0	2–0
3	Anton Suseno (INA)	1	2	2	4	115	119	0–2	0–2	X	2–0
4	José María Pales (ESP)	0	3	0	6	96	127	0–2	0–2	0–2	X

=== Group N ===
Rank	Athlete	W	L	GW	GL	PW	PL	GER	PRK	JPN	CHI
1	Steffen Fetzner (GER)	3	0	6	2	159	115	X	2–1	2–1	2–0
2	Kim Song-hui (PRK)	2	1	5	2	142	91	1–2	X	2–0	2–0
3	Takehiro Watanabe (JPN)	1	2	3	4	98	132	1–2	0–2	X	2–0
4	Marcos Núñez (CHI)	0	3	0	6	67	128	0–2	0–2	0–2	X

=== Group O ===
Rank	Athlete	W	L	GW	GL	PW	PL	AUT	JPN	NZL	CUB
1	Ding Yi (AUT)	3	0	6	0	126	87	X	2–0	2–0	2–0
2	Hiroshi Shibutani (JPN)	2	1	4	2	117	93	0–2	X	2–0	2–0
3	Peter Jackson (NZL)	1	2	2	4	104	111	0–2	0–2	X	2–0
4	Rubén Arado (CUB)	0	3	0	6	70	126	0–2	0–2	0–2	X

=== Group P ===
Rank	Athlete	W	L	GW	GL	PW	PL	GBR	PRK	ESP	IND
1	Carl Prean (GBR)	3	0	6	1	145	93	X	2–0	2–1	2–0
2	Choi Kyong-sob (PRK)	2	1	4	3	129	124	0–2	X	2–1	2–0
3	Roberto Casares (ESP)	1	2	4	5	158	171	1–2	1–2	X	2–1
4	Chetan Baboor (IND)	0	3	1	6	104	148	0–2	0–2	1–2	X

== Knockout stage ==
First round
A1	J-P Gatien (FRA)	22	25	21	17	21
J1	Yoo N-k (KOR)	24	23	19	21	19
O1	Ding Y (AUT)	21	21	21
F1	J-M Saive (BEL)	17	17	15
G1	Ma W (CHN)	21	21	21
M1	P Haldan (NED)	15	16	13
N1	S Fetzner (GER)	13	17	11
C1	J Persson (SWE)	21	21	21
D1	A Grubba (POL)	13	18	7
K1	Wang T (CHN)	21	21	21
L1	Z Primorac (CRO)	21	21	20	8	12
H1	Kim T-s (KOR)	19	13	22	21	21
E1	J Roßkopf (GER)	21	21	18	21
I1	Li G-s (PRK)	13	14	21	15
P1	C Prean (GBR)	15	14	15
B1	J-O Waldner (SWE)	21	21	21

Quarterfinals
A1	J-P Gatien (FRA)	21	20	18	21	21
O1	Ding Y (AUT)	13	22	21	18	5
G1	Ma W (CHN)	21	21	21
C1	J Persson (SWE)	14	18	8
K1	Wang T (CHN)	19	21	12	21	18
H1	Kim T-s (KOR)	21	15	21	13	21
E1	J Roßkopf (GER)	15	14	21	17
B1	J-O Waldner (SWE)	21	21	18	21

Semifinals
A1	J-P Gatien (FRA)	20	22	21	12	21
G1	Ma W (CHN)	22	20	16	21	13
H1	Kim T-s (KOR)	9	18	19
B1	J-O Waldner (SWE)	21	21	21

Gold medal match
A1	J-P Gatien (FRA)	10	18	23
B1	J-O Waldner (SWE)	21	21	25
