= Jae-kyung =

- Hangul: 재경
- RR: Jaegyeong
- MR: Chaegyŏng

Jae-kyung is a Korean given name.

People with this name include:

- Pak Jae-gyong (born 1933), North Korean politician and soldier
- Cha Jae-kyung (born 1971), South Korean handball player
- Jane Shin (born Shin Jae-kyung, 1980), South Korean-born Canadian academic and former politician
- Park Jae-kyung (golfer) (born 1984), South Korean professional golfer
- Kim Jae-kyung (born 1988), South Korean actress

== See also ==
- List of Korean given names
