= Karmele =

Female given name

Karmele is a Basque feminine given name. People with the name include:

- Karmele Jaio (born 1970), Spanish writer and journalist
- Karmele Leizaola (1929–2021), Basque-born Venezuelan graphic designer
- Karmele Makazaga (born 1964), Spanish team handball player
- Karmele Marchante (born 1946), Spanish journalist and feminist
- Miren Karmele Azkarate Villar (born 1955), Spanish politician, professor of Basque philology
