= Marie Šmídová =

Marie Šmídová may refer to:

- Marie Šmídová (handballer) (born 1966), Czech handball player
- Marie Šmídová (table tennis) (1907–1963), Czech table tennis player
