= Kim In-ho =

Kim In-ho may refer to:

- Kim In-ho (footballer)
- Kim In-ho (pentathlete)
