= Djoman =

Djoman is a surname. Notable people with the surname include:

- Emilie Djoman (born 1959), Ivorian handball player
- Igor Djoman (born 1986), French footballer
