= Guehi =

Guehi or Guéhi is a surname. Notable people with this surname include:

- Kouko Guehi (born 1982), Ivorian footballer
- Marc Guéhi (born 2000), English footballer
- Wandou Guehi (born 1967), Ivorian handball player
