= Ajodo (name) =

Nigerian given name

- Gender: Unisex
- Language: Igala

Origin
- Origin: Igala
- Meaning: "first child born after the father's relocation to a new settlement"
- Region of origin: North-central Nigeria

Other names
- Variant form: Anejodo

Ajodo is a Nigerian name of Igala origin given to a first child born after the father's relocation to a new settlement. The variant include "Anejodo".

== Notable people with the name ==
- Angela Ajodo (born 1972) Nigerian handball player
