= Lee Mi-young =

Lee Mi-Young may refer to:

- Lee Mi-young (actress) (born 1961), South Korean actress
- Lee Mi-young (handballer) (born 1969), South Korean handball player
- Lee Mi-young (shot putter) (born 1979), South Korean shot putter
