= Attaher =

Attaher is a masculine given name. Notable people with the name include:

- Attaher Maïga, Malian politician
- Attaher Mohamed El-Mahjoub, Libyan table tennis player
