= Anyiam =

- Gender: Male
- Language: Igbo

Origin
- Origin: Igbo
- Meaning: Eye that sees
- Region of origin: Igboland

Anyiam audiois a Igbo surname of Igbo origin which means "Eye that sees".

== Notable individuals with the name ==
- Daniel Anyiam (1926–1977), Nigerian footballer and coach
- Justina Anyiam (born 1972), Nigerian handball player
- Peace Anyiam-Osigwe (1969–2023), Nigerian filmmaker
