= Palgut =

Palgut is a surname. Notable people with the surname include:

- Filip Palgut (born 1991), Slovak volleyball player
- Karyn Palgut (born 1962), American handball player
