= Skierski =

Skierski is a surname. Notable people with the surname include:

- Leonard Skierski (1866–1940), Polish military officer
- Piotr Skierski (born 1971), Polish table tennis player
