= Ihedioha (surname) =

Ihedioha is a surname. Notable people with the surname include:

- Emeka Ihedioha (born 1965), Nigerian politician
- Hanna Ihedioha (born 1997), German snowboarder
- Mary Ihedioha (born 1962), Nigerian handball player
