= Maxi Mühlner =

German handball player (born 2001)

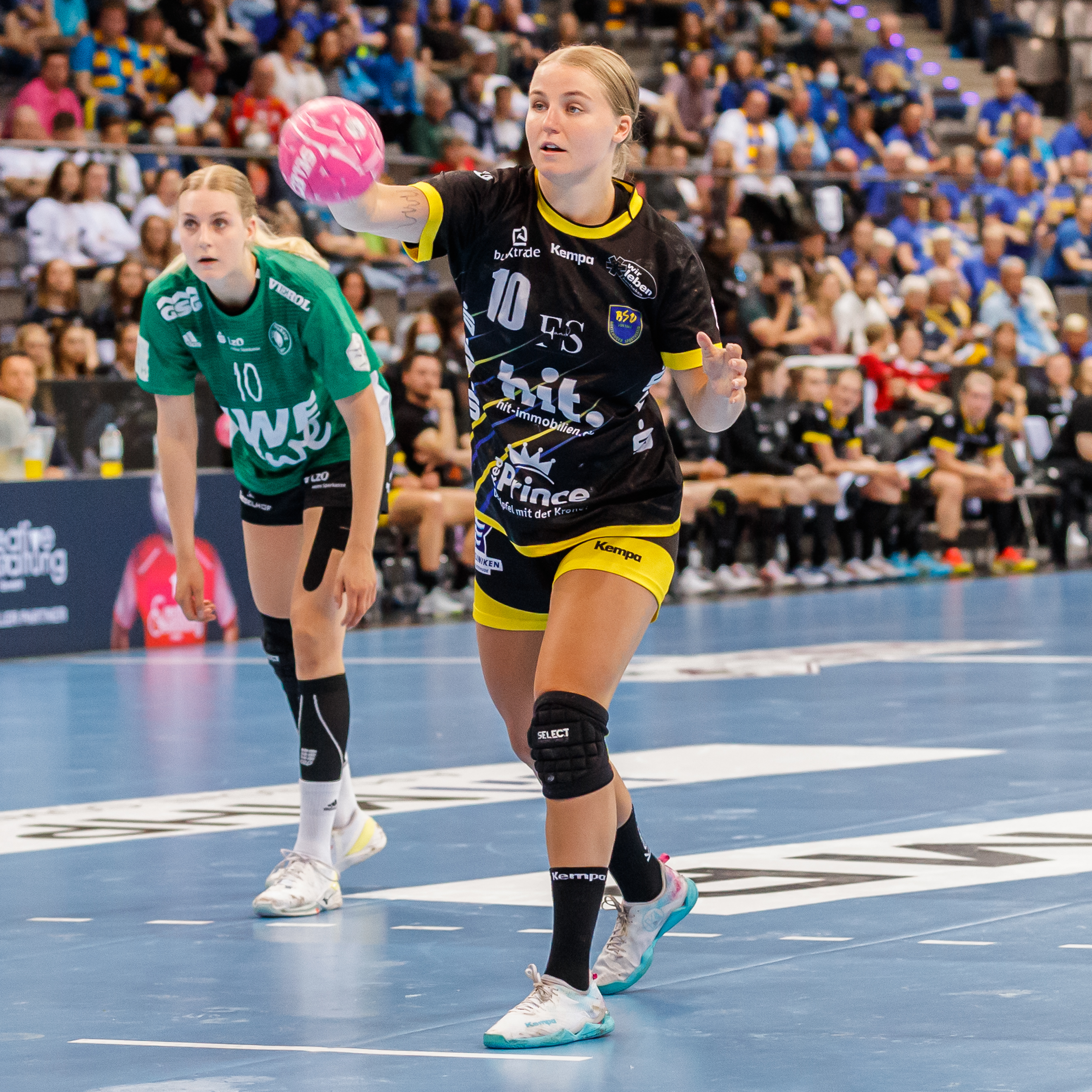
- Mühlner in May 2022

Personal information
- Nationality: German
- Born: 3 February 2001 (age 25) Leipzig, Germany
- Height: 1.78 m (5 ft 10 in)

Sport
- Sport: Handball
- Position: Line player
- Current club: HSG Blomberg-Lippe
- Number: 19

Youth career
- Years: Team
- 2006-2017: HC Leipzig
- 2017-2018: FC Midtjylland Håndbold

Senior clubs
- Years: Team
- 2018–2021: HSG Bad Wildungen
- 2021–2024: Buxtehuder SV
- 2024–: HSG Blomberg-Lippe
Medal record
European Youth Championship
Gold medal – first place	2017 Slovakia

Maxi Mühlner (born 3 February 2001) is a German handball player for HSG Blomberg-Lippe in the Frauen Handball-Bundesliga.

Mühlner reprensented the German junior national team, where she participated at the 2017 European Women's U-17 Handball Championship, winning the title. She also participated at the 2018 Women's Youth World Handball Championship, placing 5th.

In March 2021, she signed a 2-year contract with the Bundesliga club Buxtehuder SV. She has previously played for HC Leipzig, HSG Bad Wildungen and FC Midtjylland Håndbold in Denmark on youth level.

She is selected as part of the German pre-squad for the 2022 European Women's Handball Championship.

== Private ==
Her parents, Kerstin Knüpfer and Frank Mühlner were also handball players. Her mother is an Olympic Champion from 1992.

== Achievements ==
- Bundesliga:
  - Bronze: 2022
- European Youth Championship:
  - Winner: 2017
