= Azuka =

Nigerian name

- Gender: Unisex
- Language: Igbo

Origin
- Origin: Nigeria
- Meaning: The past, or history or experience is paramount or learning from the past has far much value.
- Region of origin: Igboland

Azuka audio is a name of Igbo origin. It means "The past, or history or experience is paramount or learning from the past has far much value". Azuka is a unisex name.

== Notable individuals with the name ==
- Azuka Okwuosa (born 1959), Nigerian politician
- Jay-Jay Okocha (born 1973), Nigerian former professional footballer, full name "Augustine Azuka 'Jay-Jay' Okocha"
- Izu Azuka (born 1989), Nigerian football player
- Uzoma Azuka (born 1970), Nigerian handball player
- Azuka Oforka (born 1981), British actress and playwright
