= Tercero (surname) =

Tercero is a surname. Notable people with the surname include:

- Eduardo Tercero (born 1996), Mexican footballer
- Esperanza Tercero (born 1963), Spanish handball player
- Gustavo Romero Tercero (born 1970), Spanish criminal
- Scott Tercero (born 1981), American football player
