= Mercedes Fuertes =

Spanish handball player (born 1955)

Personal information
- Nationality: Spanish
- Born: 28 April 1955 (age 71) Alfambra, Spain

Sport
- Sport: Handball

Mercedes Fuertes (born 28 April 1955) is a Spanish former handball player. She competed in the women's tournament at the 1992 Summer Olympics.

In 1979, Fuertes became the first woman in Spain to be paid professionally for playing handball, receiving 7,000 pesetas per month. During her international career she made 110 appearances for the Spanish national team and scored 292 goals. After retiring from competition, she remained involved in the sport and later served as president of the Association of Women in Handball.
