= Teresa Zurowski =

Austrian handball player (born 1956)

Personal information
- Full name: Liliana Teresa Żurowska
- Nationality: Polish, Austrian
- Born: 22 April 1956 (age 70) Świdwin, Poland

Sport
- Sport: Handball
National team
- Years: Team
- 1976-1985: Poland
- 1987-1992: Austria

Liliana Teresa Żurowska, née Rusek (born 22 April 1956) is a Polish-Austrian handball player.

She competed at the 1992 Summer Olympics, where Austria placed 5th.
