= Blanca Martín-Calero =

Spanish handball player (born 1970)

Personal information
- Nationality: Spanish
- Born: 12 May 1970 (age 55) Valladolid, Spain

Sport
- Sport: Handball

Blanca Martín-Calero (born 12 May 1970) is a Spanish handball player. She competed in the women's tournament at the 1992 Summer Olympics.
