= Abdelhadi Legdali =

Moroccan table tennis player

Personal information
- Nationality: Moroccan
- Born: 8 February 1966 (age 59)

Sport
- Sport: Table tennis

Abdelhadi Legdali (born 8 February 1966) is a Moroccan table tennis player. He competed in the men's singles event at the 1992 Summer Olympics.
