= Igor Solopov =

Russian-born Estonian table tennis player (1961–2019)

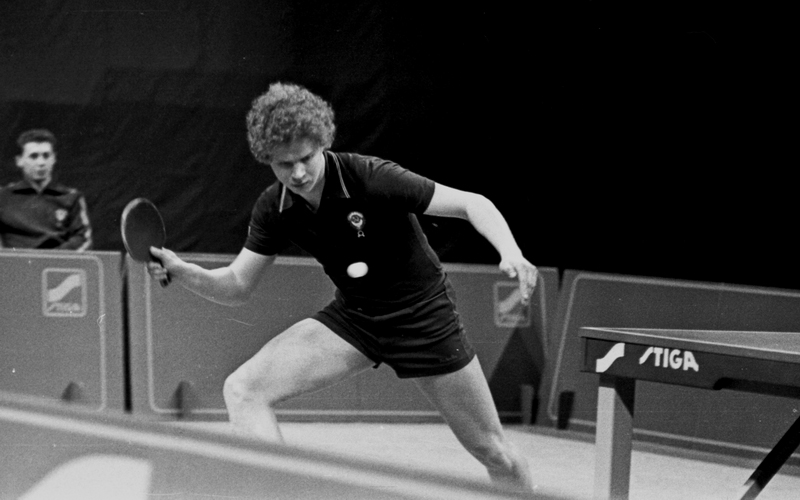
- Solopov in 1983

Personal information
- Full name: Igor Solopov
- Nationality: Soviet Union Estonia
- Born: 17 April 1961 Magnitogorsk, Russian SFSR, Soviet Union
- Died: 22 June 2019 (aged 58)
- Height: 182 cm (6 ft 0 in)

Sport
- Sport: Table tennis
- Playing style: Right-handed, shakehand grip
- Highest ranking: 33 (June 1981)
Medal record
Men's table tennis
Representing Soviet Union
Event	1st	2nd	3rd
European Championships	0	0	1
Total	0	0	1
Representing Soviet Union
table tennis
European Championships
Bronze medal – third place	1978 Duisburg	Team
European Youth Championships
Gold medal – first place	1978 Barcelona	Team
Gold medal – first place	1977 Vichy	Team
Gold medal – first place	1976 Mödling	Team
Silver medal – second place	1978 Barcelona	Singles
Bronze medal – third place	1978 Barcelona	Mixed Doubles

Igor Solopov (17 April 1961 – 12 June 2019) was a Russian-born Estonian table tennis player. Born in Magnitogorsk, Russian SFSR, he represented Estonia in the men's singles event at the 1992 Summer Olympics. Solopov, who participated in seven World Table Tennis Championships, previously won a bronze medal with the Soviet men's team at the 1978 European Table Tennis Championships.

From the mid-1990s, Solopov resided in Sweden. His death on 12 June 2019, at the age of 58, was announced by the Table Tennis Federation of Russia.
