= Louis Botha (table tennis) =

South African table tennis player

Personal information
- Nationality: South African
- Born: 2 February 1957 (age 68)

Sport
- Sport: Table tennis

Louis Botha (born 2 February 1957) is a South African table tennis player. He competed in the men's singles event at the 1992 Summer Olympics.
