= Roland Vími =

Slovak table tennis player (1969–2025)

Personal information
- Nationality: Slovakia
- Born: 21 June 1969 Dunajská Streda, Czechoslovakia
- Died: 13 April 2025 (aged 55) Trhová Hradská, Slovakia
Medal record
Representing Czechoslovakia
World Table Tennis Championships
Bronze medal – third place	1991	Men's Team

Roland Vími (21 June 1969 – 13 April 2025) was a Slovak table tennis player.

== Biography ==
Vími won a bronze medal at the 1991 World Table Tennis Championships in the Swaythling Cup (men's team event) with Tomáš Jančí, Petr Javůrek, Petr Korbel and Milan Grman for Czechoslovakia.

He competed for Czechoslovakia in the men’s singles event at the 1992 Olympics.

Vími died on 13 April 2025, at the age of 55.

== See also ==
- List of table tennis players
- List of World Table Tennis Championships medalists
