= Rita Hernández =

Spanish handball player (born 1969)

Personal information
- Nationality: Spanish
- Born: 16 March 1969 (age 56) Las Palmas, Spain

Sport
- Sport: Handball

Rita Hernández (born 16 March 1969) is a Spanish handball player. She competed in the women's tournament at the 1992 Summer Olympics.
