= Petr Javůrek =

Czech table tennis player

Personal information
- Nationality: Czechoslovakia
- Born: 1968 (age 57–58)
Medal record
Representing Czechoslovakia
World Table Tennis Championships
Bronze medal – third place	1991	Men's Team

Petr Javůrek (born 1968) is a Czech former table tennis player.

He won a bronze medal at the 1991 World Table Tennis Championships in the Swaythling Cup (men's team event) with Tomáš Jančí, Roland Vími, Petr Korbel and Milan Grman for Czechoslovakia.

== See also ==
- List of table tennis players
- List of World Table Tennis Championships medalists
