= Nicole Peissl =

Austrian handball player (born 1971)

Personal information
- Nationality: Austrian
- Born: 26 July 1971 (age 55)

Sport
- Sport: Handball
National team
- Years: Team
- –: Austria

Nicole Peissl (born 26 July 1971) is an Austrian handball player.

She competed at the 1992 Summer Olympics, where Austria placed 5th.
