= Milan Grman =

Slovak table tennis player

Personal information
- Nationality: Slovakia
- Born: 25 August 1969 (age 56) Topoľčany, Czechoslovakia
Medal record
Representing Czechoslovakia
World Table Tennis Championships
Bronze medal – third place	1991	Men's Team

Milan Grman (born 25 August 1969) is a Slovak former table tennis player.

He won a bronze medal at the 1991 World Table Tennis Championships in the Swaythling Cup (men's team event) with Tomáš Jančí, Petr Javůrek, Petr Korbel and Roland Vími for Czechoslovakia.

== See also ==
- List of table tennis players
- List of World Table Tennis Championships medalists
