= Montserrat Marin =

Spanish handball player (born 1968)

Personal information
- Full name: Montserrat Marín López
- Nationality: Spanish
- Born: 5 October 1968 (age 58) Madrid, Spain

Sport
- Sport: Handball
- Position: Goalkeeper
National team
Years	Team	Apps	(Gls)
1987-1993	Spain	90	(1)

Montserrat Marin (born 5 October 1968) is a Spanish handball player. She competed in the women's tournament at the 1992 Summer Olympics, placing 7th
