= Park Jae-kyung (golfer) =

South Korean golfer

Personal information
- Nationality: South Korea
- Born: 15 February 1984 (age 42) Seoul
- Height: 1.81 m (5 ft 11 in)
- Weight: 75 kg (165 lb; 11.8 st)

Career
- Sport: Golf
- Turned professional: 2003
- Current tour: Korean Tour

Park Jae-kyung (Korean: 박재경; born 15 February 1984) is a South Korean professional golfer currently playing on the Korean Tour.

== Early life and amateur golf career ==
Park was born into a golfing family. His grand-uncle Park Myeong-chul served as the 3rd and 4th President of the KPGA, and was a South Korean representative for the World Cup from 1956 to 1959.

His father's elder brother, his father, and his own elder brother are all KPGA tour professionals.

Unsurprisingly, Park was exposed to golf from a young age and his childhood was filled with golf clubs instead of toys. It was in 6th grade that Park decided that he would pursue a golfing career.

== Professional career ==
Park became a member of the KPGA in 2003, first as a professional on 29 April, then as a tour professional on 29 August. He made his Korean Tour debut in 2004.

Park completed his mandatory military service obligations from 2008 to 2010. Park came in third place in his first competition after military service, the 8th KPGA Academy Tour.

Since then he has participated in the Korean Tour and Korean Challenge Tour.
