= Barbara Diribe =

Nigerian handball player (born 1976)

Personal information
- Nationality: Nigerian
- Born: 31 October 1976 (age 49)

Sport
- Sport: Handball

Barbara Diribe (born 31 October 1976) is a Nigerian handball player. She competed in the women's tournament at the 1992 Summer Olympics.
