= Laurie Fellner =

American handball player

Personal information
- Nationality: American
- Born: 15 January 1968 (age 57)

Sport
- Sport: Handball

Laurie Fellner (born January 15, 1968) is an American former handball player who competed in the 1992 Summer Olympics and in the 1996 Summer Olympics.
