= Mirjana Krstić =

Yugoslav handball player

Personal information
- Nationality: Yugoslav
- Born: 22 August 1964 (age 61)

Sport
- Sport: Handball

Mirjana Krstić (born 22 August 1964) is a Yugoslav handball player. She competed in the women's tournament at the 1988 Summer Olympics.
