= Slavica Rinčić =

Croatian handball player (born 1966)

Personal information
- Nationality: Croatian
- Born: 17 May 1966 (age 59) Split, SR Croatia, SFR Yugoslavia

Sport
- Sport: Handball

Slavica Rinčić (born 17 May 1966) is a Croatian handball player. She competed in the women's tournament at the 1988 Summer Olympics.
