= Irena Tomašovičová =

Slovak handball player (born 1964)

Personal information
- Nationality: Slovak
- Born: 12 November 1964 (age 61) Turzovka, Czechoslovakia

Sport
- Sport: Handball

Irena Tomašovičová (born 12 November 1964) is a Slovak handball player. She competed in the women's tournament at the 1988 Summer Olympics.
