= Ngozi Opara =

Nigerian handball player (born 1971)

Personal information
- Nationality: Nigerian
- Born: 11 November 1971 (age 54)

Sport
- Sport: Handball

Ngozi Opara (born 11 November 1971) is a Nigerian handball player. She competed in the women's tournament at the 1992 Summer Olympics.
