= Svetlana Mičić =

Croatian handball player (born 1960)

Personal information
- Nationality: Croatian
- Born: 28 May 1960 (age 65) Požega, Yugoslavia

Sport
- Sport: Handball

Svetlana Mičić (born 28 May 1960) is a Yugoslavian handball player. She competed in the women's tournament at the 1988 Summer Olympics.
