= Li Lirong =

Chinese handball player (born 1963)

Personal information
- Nationality: Chinese
- Born: 19 April 1963 (age 62)

Sport
- Sport: Handball

Li Lirong (born 19 April 1963) is a Chinese handball player. She competed in the women's tournament at the 1988 Summer Olympics.
