= Mary Nwachukwu =

Nigerian handball player (born 1969)

Personal information
- Nationality: Nigerian
- Born: 20 November 1969 (age 56)

Sport
- Sport: Handball

Mary Nwachukwu (born 20 November 1969) is a Nigerian handball player. She competed in the women's tournament at the 1992 Summer Olympics.
