= Mary Soronadi =

Nigerian handball player (born 1971)

Personal information
- Nationality: Nigerian
- Born: 15 August 1971 (age 54)

Sport
- Sport: Handball

Mary Soronadi (born 15 August 1971) is a Nigerian handball player. She competed in the women's tournament at the 1992 Summer Olympics.
