= Dolores Ruiz =

Spanish handball player (born 1964)

Personal information
- Full name: Dolores Ruiz de Assin Jorda
- Nationality: Spanish
- Born: 16 April 1964 (age 62) Madrid Spain

Sport
- Sport: Handball
National team
- Years: Team
- –: Spain

Dolores Ruiz de Assin Jorda (born 16 April 1964) is a Spanish team handball player who played for the club Ent. Pegaso and for the Spanish national team. She was born in Madrid. She competed at the 1992 Summer Olympics in Barcelona, where the Spanish team placed seventh.

She was retired because of her problems in her knee. Nowadays, she is a physical education teacher in a Spanish high school (IES Antares).
