= Raed Hamdan =

Saudi Arabian table tennis player

Raed Al-Hamdan رائد الحمدان
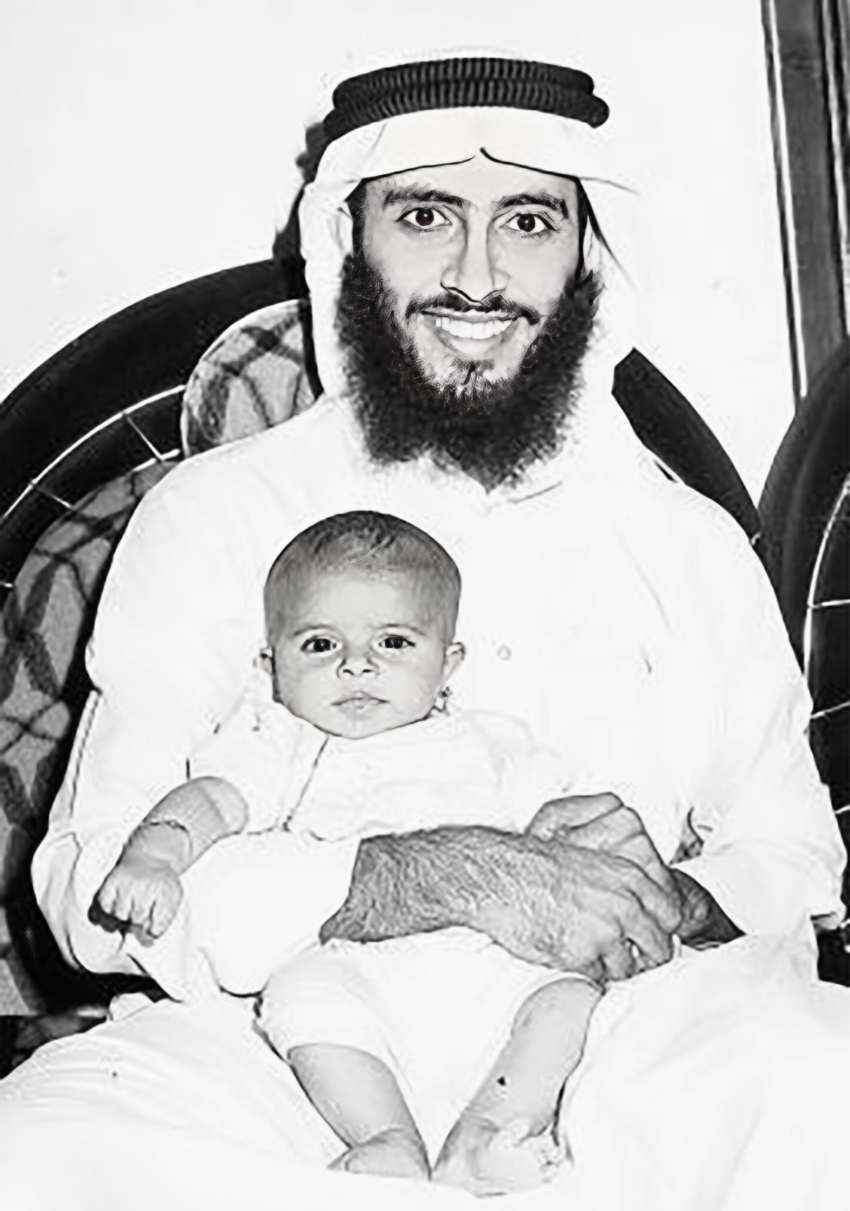
- Al-Hamdan in 1987

Personal information
- Nationality: Saudi Arabian
- Born: 7 January 1962 Saudi Arabia
- Died: 7 September 1993 (aged 31)

Sport
- Sport: Table tennis

Raed Hamdan (Arabic: رائد الحمدان) (born 7 January 1962 – 8 September 1993) was a Saudi Arabian table tennis player. He competed in the men's singles event at the 1992 Summer Olympics.

== Career ==
Al-Hamdan emerged as a leading sports figure in Saudi Arabia in 1975. His last major participation was representing Saudi Arabia at the 1992 Barcelona Summer Olympics. He was awarded the Ideal Athlete of Saudi Arabia in 1980.

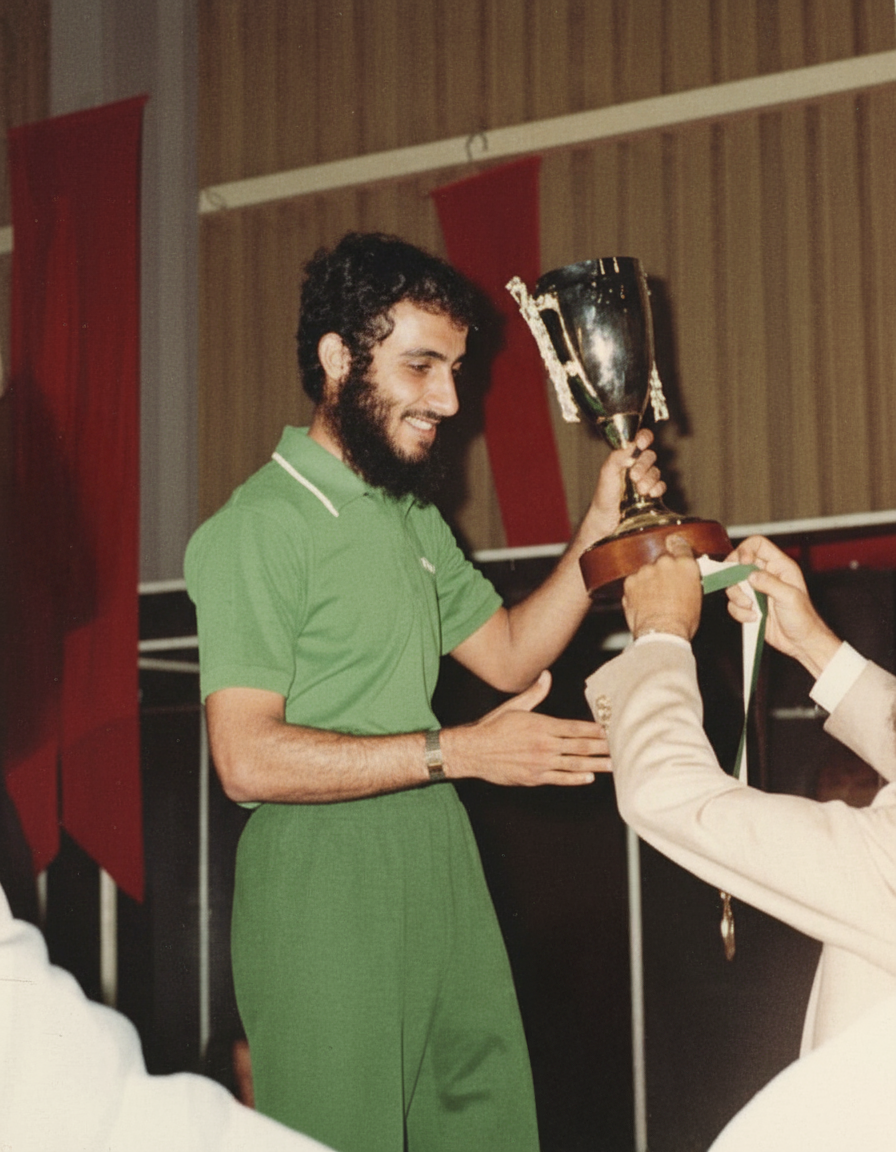
Raed Al-Hamdan receives the 10th Arab Championship trophy in Tunisia in 1986.

=== Continental level ===
Represented Saudi Arabia in regular Asian Table Tennis Federation championships since 1977.

=== World level ===
Represented Saudi Arabia in World Championships from the 34th edition in Birmingham, England (1977) to the 39th edition in New Delhi, India (1987).

=== Olympic Games ===
Concluded his career by representing Saudi Arabia in the 1992 Barcelona Olympics after qualifying through the West Asia preliminary rounds, being the only Arab representative from the region.

=== Other achievements ===
- Winner of the Ideal Player award by the Saudi Table Tennis Federation in 1980.
- Nominated by the Saudi Olympic Committee for the Fair Play award in 1992 for significant contributions to sports development.

== Death ==
Al-Hamdan died on 8 September 1993 after a long illness.
