= Piotr Skierski =

Polish table tennis player

Personal information
- Nationality: Polish
- Born: 30 December 1971 (age 53); Rybnik, Poland

Sport
- Sport: Table tennis

Piotr Skierski (born 30 December 1971) is a Polish table tennis player. He competed in the men's singles event at the 1992 Summer Olympics.
