= Marta Pösová =

Slovak handball player (born 1965)

Personal information
- Nationality: Slovak
- Born: 4 April 1965 (age 60) Bojnice, Czechoslovakia

Sport
- Sport: Handball

Marta Pösová (born 4 April 1965) is a Slovak handball player. She competed in the women's tournament at the 1988 Summer Olympics.
