= Karmele Leizaola =

Venezuelan graphic designer (1929–2021)

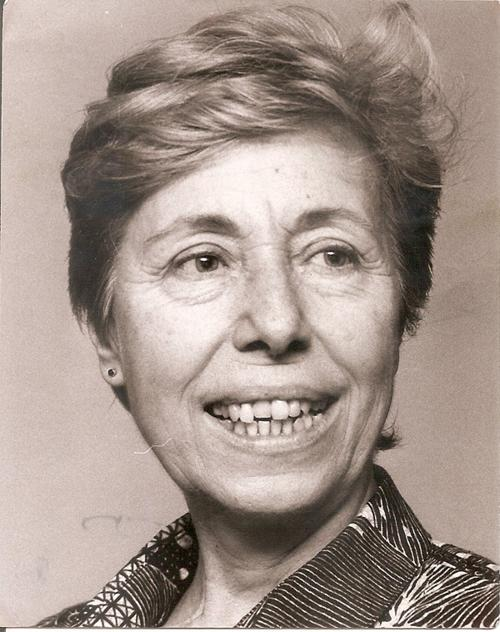
Karmele Leizaola

Karmele Leizaola (San Sebastián, Guipúzcoa, Basque, May 11, 1929 – Madrid, February 5, 2021) was a Venezuelan graphic designer. She is considered a pioneer of information design in Venezuela and her work has been influential for many generations of editorial designers.

== Biography ==
Leizaola was the daughter of Ricardo Leizaola and María Azpiazu, who left her birth city in 1936 and moved to France with her mother and siblings due to the Spanish Civil War.

Her father, Su padre, a Spanish printer, moved to Caracas in 1940 and worked with a Caracas en 1940.

Karmele Leizaola arrived in Venezuela in 1945 and soon thereafter entered the Colegio San José de Tarbes to continue her studies for two years.

In 1959 she married Luis de las Heras, with whom she had four children: the journalists Txomin las Heras, the cartoonist Eneko las Heras, the editors Mikel las Heras y Estíbaliz las Heras

She died February 5, 2021, in Madrid, two days after contracting COVID-19.

=== Career ===
In 1947, Karmele Leizaola started to work alongside her father at the workshop of Tipografía Vargas in downtown Caracas. Already with a certain affinity for drawing, her father invited her to act as an interpreter between a Swiss designer and a Venezuelan. This work led her to her first experience with graphic design, typography and journalism.

Later, Leizaola continued her work in publications such as Élite, Momento y la Bohemia de la Cadena Capriles. There she got to know people including Gabriel García Márquez, Simón Alberto Consalvi, and Guillermo Sucre.

In 1979, Leizaola began working on the newspaper el Nacional, for which she got first recognition for her work. This made her the first woman to join an editorial office of a print publication in Venezuela.

In later years, Leizaola continued to work for publications such as Domingo Hoy, the weekly cultural section of Economía Hoy and the layout of the monthly insert inside Feriado. Her colleagues included Víctor Hugo Irazábal and Carmen Riera.

== Style ==
Leizaola's work signified a new phase of editorial design in Venezuela which was more fluid. She considered design a necessary part of journalism.

Her innovative style made use of negative to visualize the contrast between different types of information. She easily managed the use of typographic fonts and the structure of texts to give a sense of balance and unity to things.

== Prizes and recognition ==
In 1982 Leizaola received the top prize for Journalism in Venezuela for layout and design.

In 1990 she received Premio Nacional de Periodismo from Carlos Andrés Pérez.
