= Tomáš Jančí =

Slovak table tennis player

Personal information
- Nationality: Slovakia
- Born: 31 July 1968 (age 57) Bratislava, Czechoslovakia
Medal record
Representing Czechoslovakia
World Table Tennis Championships
Bronze medal – third place	1991	Men's Team

Tomáš Jančí (born 31 July 1968) is a Slovak former international table tennis player.

He was born on 31 July 1968 in Bratislava.

He won a bronze medal at the 1991 World Table Tennis Championships in the Swaythling Cup (men's team event) with Roland Vími, Petr Javůrek, Petr Korbel and Milan Grman for Czechoslovakia.

He competed in the 1992 Olympics.

== See also ==
- List of table tennis players
- List of World Table Tennis Championships medalists
