= Anna Hradská =

Slovak handball player (born 1959)

Personal information
- Nationality: Slovak
- Born: 11 July 1959 (age 66) Myjava, Czechoslovakia

Sport
- Country: Czechoslovakia
- Sport: Handball

Anna Hradská (born 11 July 1959) is a Slovak handball player. She competed for Czechoslovakia in the women's tournament at the 1988 Summer Olympics.
