= Megan Gallagher (handballer) =

American handball player

Personal information
- Nationality: American
- Born: May 12, 1963 (age 63) Fontana, California, United States

Sport
- Sport: Handball

For the American theater and television actress, see Megan Gallagher.

Megan Gallagher (born May 12, 1963) is an American handball player. She competed in the women's tournament at the 1988 Summer Olympics. Before competing in handball at the 1988 Olympics, Gallagher played basketball at Cal State Fullerton and won a gold medal with the United States at the 1987 Pan American Games.
