= Jana Stašová =

Slovak handball player (born 1960)

Personal information
- Nationality: Slovak
- Born: 5 November 1960 (age 65) Ružomberok, Czechoslovakia

Sport
- Sport: Handball

Jana Stašová (born 5 November 1960) is a Slovak handball player. She competed in the women's tournament at the 1988 Summer Olympics.
