= Paul Hâldan =

Dutch table tennis player

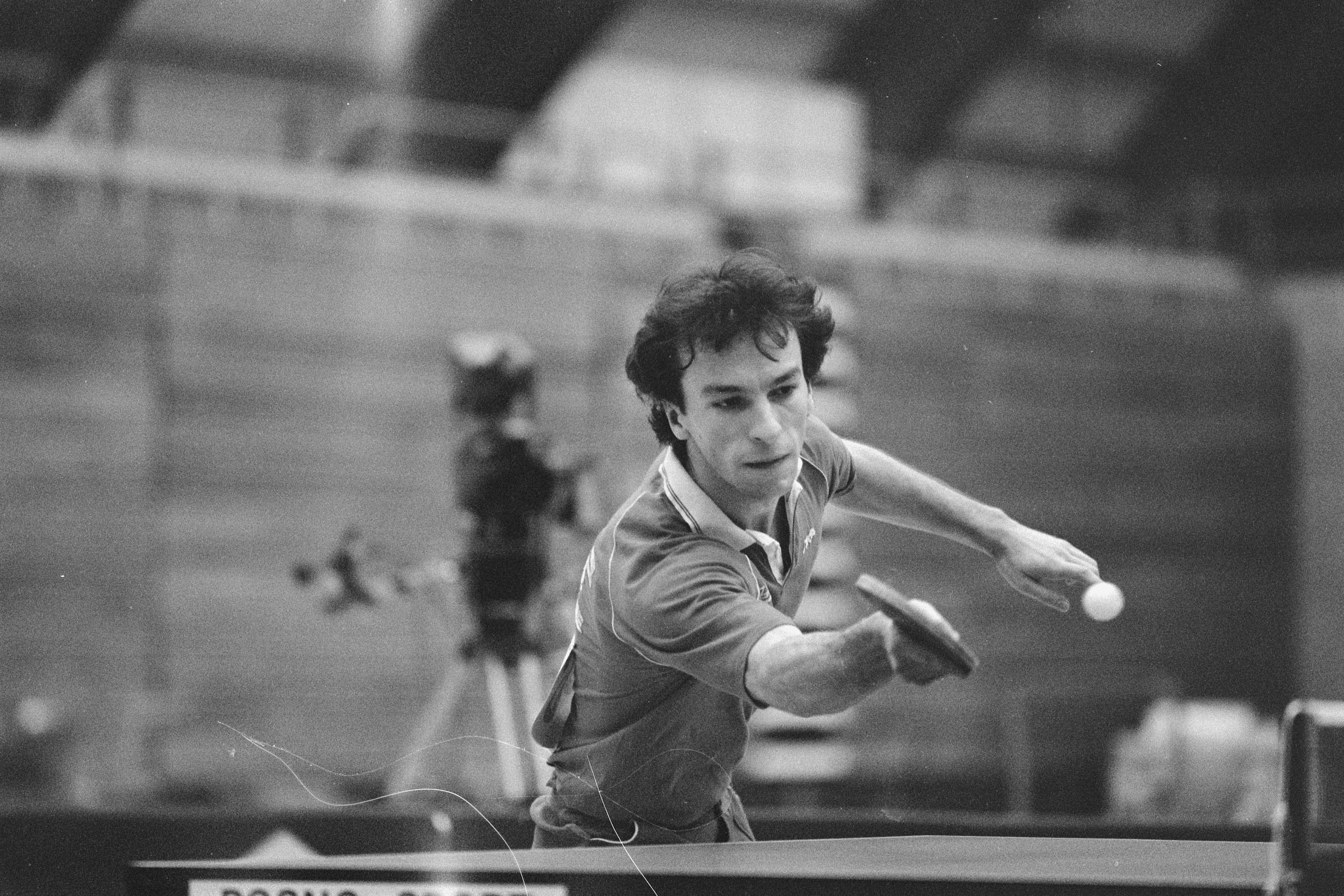
Paul Haldan

Paul Hâldan (born 12 April 1965 in Craiova, Romania) is a Romanian-born Dutch professional table tennis player.

After a match in the Netherlands in 1983, Hâldan defected, resulting in a 2-year ban for international matches instigated by the Romanian table tennis federation. Only after obtaining his Dutch citizenship in 1986/87 could he participate again internationally, resulting in a relative short career.

== Career highlights ==
Summer Olympic Games
1992, Barcelona, men's singles, last 16
World Championships
1991, Chiba, men's singles, last 32
1993, Gothenburg, men's singles, last 32
World Team Cup:
1990, Hokkaidō, 5th
European Championships
1988, Paris, men's singles, quarter final
1990, Gothenburg, men's singles, quarter final
European Top-12 Championships
1991, Den Bosch, 11th
