= Amy Gamble =

American handball player

Personal information
- Born: December 17, 1964 (age 61) Wheeling, West Virginia, United States

Sport
- Sport: Handball

Amy Jean Gamble (born December 17, 1964) is an American former handball player. She competed in the women's tournament at the 1988 Summer Olympics.
