= Moon Hyang-ja =

South Korean handball player (born 1972)

Medal record

Representing South Korea

Women's handball

Olympic Games
Gold medal – first place	1992 Barcelona	Team
Silver medal – second place	1996 Atlanta	Team

Asian Games
Gold medal – first place	1994 Hiroshima	

Moon Hyang-Ja (born May 5, 1972) is a South Korean team handball player (goalkeeper) and Olympic champion. She received a gold medal with the Korean team at the 1992 Summer Olympics in Barcelona. She received a silver medal at the 1996 Summer Olympics in Atlanta.

She also won a gold medal at the 1994 Asian Games.
