= Petr Korbel =

Czech table tennis player

Petr Korbel (born 6 June 1971) is a Czech former table tennis player. He has competed in five Olympics from 1992 to 2008 and his best performance was in 1996, when he came fourth in the singles, losing to Germany's Jörg Roßkopf in the bronze medal match.

== Life ==
Korbel was born on 6 June 1971 in Havířov, Czechoslovakia.

== Career ==
Petr Korbel is the most successful among the current Czech table tennis players. He has been one of the top European and world players for more than 10 years. Korbel's best position in the ITTF world rankings was 16th place in 2001. He is currently ranked 119th (October 2012).

In terms of playing style, Petr Korbel can be described as an offensive, technical two-wing looper. Another weapon of his is short game. Korbel is a right-handed shakehand player with an excellent use of the wrist when playing backhand loops. His spectacular backhand topspin with a strong sidespin, called "chiquita" after the curve of the ball, is well known among his competitors. Korbel uses this stroke to attack even very short and low serves, and this surprising stroke often brings points.

Korbel is a Butterfly contract player and co-operated on the development of a table tennis blade which has been produced under his name.

== Big events appearance ==
- 15x European Championships
- 14x World Championships
- 5x Olympic Games

== Career records ==
- 1988 – European Junior Champion
- 1991 – World Championships: 3rd in the team competition (with Milan Grman, Tomáš Jančí, Petr Javůrek and Roland Vími)
- 1996 – Olympic Games: 4th place
- 2000 – 3rd position European Championship Single
- 2003, 2005, 2010 – European Championships: 3rd in the team competition
- 4-time winner of the Prague Open table tennis tournament

== See also ==
- List of athletes with the most appearances at Olympic Games
