= Chiaka Lauretta Ihebom =

Nigerian handball player (born 1968)

Personal information
- Nationality: Nigerian
- Born: 23 August 1968 (age 57)

Sport
- Sport: Handball

Chiaka Lauretta Ihebom (born 23 August 1968) is a Nigerian handball player. She competed in the women's tournament at the 1992 Summer Olympics.
