= Lee Ho-youn =

South Korean handball player (born 1971)

Medal record

Women's handball

Representing South Korea

Olympic Games
Gold medal – first place	1992 Barcelona	Team

Asian Games
Gold medal – first place	1994 Hiroshima	

Lee Ho-Youn (born May 3, 1971) is a South Korean team handball player and Olympic champion. She won the gold medal at the 1992 Summer Olympics in Barcelona, with the Korean national team.

She also won a gold medal at the 1994 Asian Games.
