= Li Jie (handballer) =

Chinese handball player (born 1955)

Personal information
- Nationality: Chinese
- Born: 9 July 1955 (age 70)

Sport
- Sport: Handball

Li Jie (born 9 July 1955) is a Chinese handball player. She competed in the women's tournament at the 1988 Summer Olympics.
