= Božena Mažgutová =

Slovak handball player (born 1959)

Personal information
- Nationality: Slovak
- Born: 2 December 1959 (age 66) Sečovce, Czechoslovakia

Sport
- Sport: Handball

Božena Mažgutová (born 2 December 1959) is a Slovak handball player. She competed in the women's tournament at the 1988 Summer Olympics.
