= Ljiljana Marković =

Yugoslav handball player

Personal information
- Nationality: Yugoslav
- Born: 11 February 1967 (age 58)

Sport
- Sport: Handball

Ljiljana Marković (born 11 February 1967) is a Yugoslav handball player. She competed in the women's tournament at the 1988 Summer Olympics.
