= Barbara Schaaf =

American handball player

Personal information
- Full name: Barbara June Schaaf
- Born: February 22, 1965 (age 60) Oak Lawn, Illinois, U.S.

Sport
- Sport: Handball

Barbara June Schaaf (born February 22, 1965, in Oak Lawn, Illinois) is an American former handball player who competed in the 1992 Summer Olympics.
