= Dai Jianfen =

Chinese handball player (born 1968)

Personal information
- Nationality: Chinese
- Born: 20 October 1968 (age 57)

Sport
- Sport: Handball

Dai Jianfen (born 20 October 1968) is a Chinese handball player. She competed in the women's tournament at the 1988 Summer Olympics.
