= Eunice Idausa =

Nigerian handball player (born 1975)

Personal information
- Nationality: Nigerian
- Born: 18 August 1975 (age 50)

Sport
- Sport: Handball

Eunice Idausa (born 18 August 1975) is a Nigerian handball player. She competed in the women's tournament at the 1992 Summer Olympics.
