= Santiago Roque =

Cuban table tennis player

Personal information
- Nationality: Cuban
- Born: 4 October 1966 (age 58)

Sport
- Sport: Table tennis

Santiago Roque (born 4 October 1966) is a Cuban table tennis player. He competed in the men's singles event at the 1992 Summer Olympics.
