= Cha Jae-kyung =

South Korean handball player (born 1971)

- Hangul: 차재경
- Hanja: 車在景
- RR: Cha Jaegyeong
- MR: Ch'a Chaegyŏng

Cha Jae-kyung
Medal record

Women's handball

Representing South Korea

Olympic Games
Gold medal – first place	1992 Barcelona	Team

Asian Games
Gold medal – first place	1994 Hiroshima	

Cha Jae-kyung (born November 1, 1971) is a South Korean team handball player and Olympic champion. She competed at the 1992 Summer Olympics in Barcelona, where she received a gold medal with the Korean team.
