= Zita Galic =

Serbian handball player (born 1962)

Personal information
- Nationality: Serbian
- Born: 26 July 1962 (age 64) Ada, Yugoslavia
- Height: 170 cm (67 in)

Sport
- Sport: Handball

Senior clubs
- Years: Team
- 1973-1989: RK Potisje
- 1989-1995: ASPTT Metz
- 1995-1996: Jugoinspekt
National team
Years	Team	Apps
–	Yugoslavia	97

Zita Galic (born 26 July 1962) is a Serbian handball player. She competed in the women's tournament at the 1988 Summer Olympics.

With ASPTT Metz she won the 1990, 1993, 1994 and 1995 French Championship and 1990 and 1994 French cup.
