= Elisabeth Kouassi =

Ivorian handball player

Personal information
- Nationality: Ivorian
- Born: 9 July 1967 (age 58)

Sport
- Sport: Handball

Elisabeth Kouassi (born 9 July 1967) is an Ivorian handball player. She competed in the women's tournament at the 1988 Summer Olympics.
