= Agustina Nkechi Abi =

Nigerian handball player (born 1969)

Personal information
- Nationality: Nigerian
- Born: 2 December 1969 (age 56)

Sport
- Sport: Handball

Agustina Nkechi Abi (born 2 December 1969) is a Nigerian handball player. She competed in the women's tournament at the 1992 Summer Olympics. Which was the only time Nigeria has ever played Handball at the Olympics.
