= Portia Lack =

American handball player

Personal information
- Full name: Portia Ellen Lack
- Nationality: American
- Born: 20 November 1961 (age 64) Queens, New York, U.S.

Sport
- Sport: Handball

Portia Ellen Lack (born November 20, 1961, in Queens, New York) is an American former handball player who competed in the 1988 Summer Olympics and in the 1992 Summer Olympics.
