= Clementine Blé =

Ivorian handball player

Personal information
- Nationality: Ivorian
- Born: 9 September 1966 (age 59)

Sport
- Sport: Handball

Clementine Blé (born 9 September 1966) is an Ivorian handball player. She competed in the women's tournament at the 1988 Summer Olympics.
