= Karmele Makazaga =

Spanish handball player (born 1964)

Personal information
- Full name: Karmele Makazaga Urrutia
- Nationality: Spanish
- Born: 14 April 1964 (age 62) San Sebastián Spain

Sport
- Sport: Handball
National team
- Years: Team
- –: Spain

Karmele Makazaga Urrutia (born 14 April 1964) is a Spanish team handball player who played for the club Hernani and for the Spanish national team. She was born in San Sebastián. She competed at the 1992 Summer Olympics in Barcelona, where the Spanish team placed seventh.

== Path ==
He started playing handball in the schools of his town, Zarauz. In his youth he joined the Club Deportivo Zarauz and, when he turned 17, he moved to the Donostia team. After moving up to the top division, Zarauz changed again to the team of his town and, after three years, he moved to Hernani, where he developed his career for the next 10 years. He could have moved to Pegaso de Madrid, but he rejected it.
