= Mária Ďurišinová =

Slovak handball player and politician (born 1960)

Personal information
- Nationality: Slovak
- Born: 17 July 1960 (age 65) Košice, Czechoslovakia

Sport
- Sport: Handball

Mária Ďurišinová (born 17 July 1960) is a Slovak handball player. She competed in the women's tournament at the 1988 Summer Olympics.

Between 1992 and 1998 she was a Member of the National Council for the Party of the Democratic Left.
