= Julienne Vodoungbo =

Ivorian handball player

Personal information
- Nationality: Ivorian
- Born: 16 February 1962 (age 63)

Sport
- Sport: Handball

Julienne Vodoungbo (born 16 February 1962) is an Ivorian handball player. She competed in the women's tournament at the 1988 Summer Olympics.
