= Nataša Kolega =

Croatian handball player (born 1966)

Personal information
- Nationality: Croatian
- Born: 6 June 1966 (age 60) Titograd, SR Montenegro, SFR Yugoslavia

Sport
- Sport: Handball
Medal record
Women's handball
Representing Yugoslavia
World Championship
Silver medal – second place	1990 South Korea	Team competition
Representing Croatia
Mediterranean Games
Silver medal – second place	1997 Bari	Team competition

Nataša Kolega (born 6 June 1966) is a former Yugoslav and Croatian handball player. She competed in the women's tournament at the 1988 Summer Olympics, where the Yugoslav team finished fourth.
