= Esperanza Tercero =

Spanish handball player (born 1963)

Personal information
- Full name: Esperanza Tercero Rolando
- Nationality: Spanish
- Born: 27 October 1963 (age 62) Ciudad Real Spain

Sport
- Sport: Handball
National team
- Years: Team
- –: Spain

Esperanza Tercero Rolando (born 27 October 1963) is a Spanish team handball player who played for the club BM Sagunto and for the Spanish national team. She was born in Ciudad Real. She competed at the 1992 Summer Olympics in Barcelona, where the Spanish team placed seventh.
