= Marie Šmídová (handballer) =

Czech handball player (born 1966)

Personal information
- Nationality: Czech
- Born: 15 June 1966 (age 59) Cheb, Czechoslovakia

Sport
- Sport: Handball

Marie Šmídová (born 15 June 1966) is a Czech handball player. She competed in the women's tournament at the 1988 Summer Olympics.
