= Victoria Umunna =

Nigerian handball player (born 1973)

Personal information
- Nationality: Nigerian
- Born: 11 November 1973 (age 52)

Sport
- Sport: Handball

Victoria Umunna (born 11 November 1973) is a Nigerian former handball player. She represented the Nigeria women's national handball team and competed at the 1992 Summer Olympics in Barcelona.

== Career ==
=== 1991 African Championship and Olympic Qualification ===
Umunna was a member of the Nigerian women's national handball team that claimed the title at the 1991 African Women's Handball Championship held in Cairo, Egypt. The Nigerian squad secured the continental championship with an undefeated record, highlighted by a victory over Angola in the final match. This historic triumph marked Nigeria's first continental crown in women's handball and secured their qualification for the 1992 Summer Olympics. This accomplishment represented the first time an African nation, other than the established regional powers, had achieved Olympic qualification in women's handball.

=== 1992 Summer Olympics ===
Following their continental victory, Umunna and the Nigerian team made their Olympic debut at the 1992 Summer Olympics in Barcelona. The final squad consisted of 16 players under a coaching staff that included head coach Anthony Atusu and assistant Ephraim Chukwuemeka.

During the tournament, Nigeria competed in Group A alongside strong opponents: Germany, the Soviet Union, and the United States. The team finished last in their group with zero wins from three matches, suffering a 32–17 loss to Germany, a 26–18 defeat to the Soviet Union, and a narrow 23–21 loss against the United States. In the subsequent classification match for 7th and 8th place, Nigeria faced Spain and lost 26–17, concluding their Olympic run in 8th place overall.
