= Hortense Konan =

Ivorian handball player

Personal information
- Nationality: Ivorian
- Born: 3 April 1963 (age 62)

Sport
- Sport: Handball

Hortense Konan (born 3 April 1963) is an Ivorian handball player. She competed in the women's tournament at the 1988 Summer Olympics.
