= Silvia Schmitt =

German handball player (born 1962)

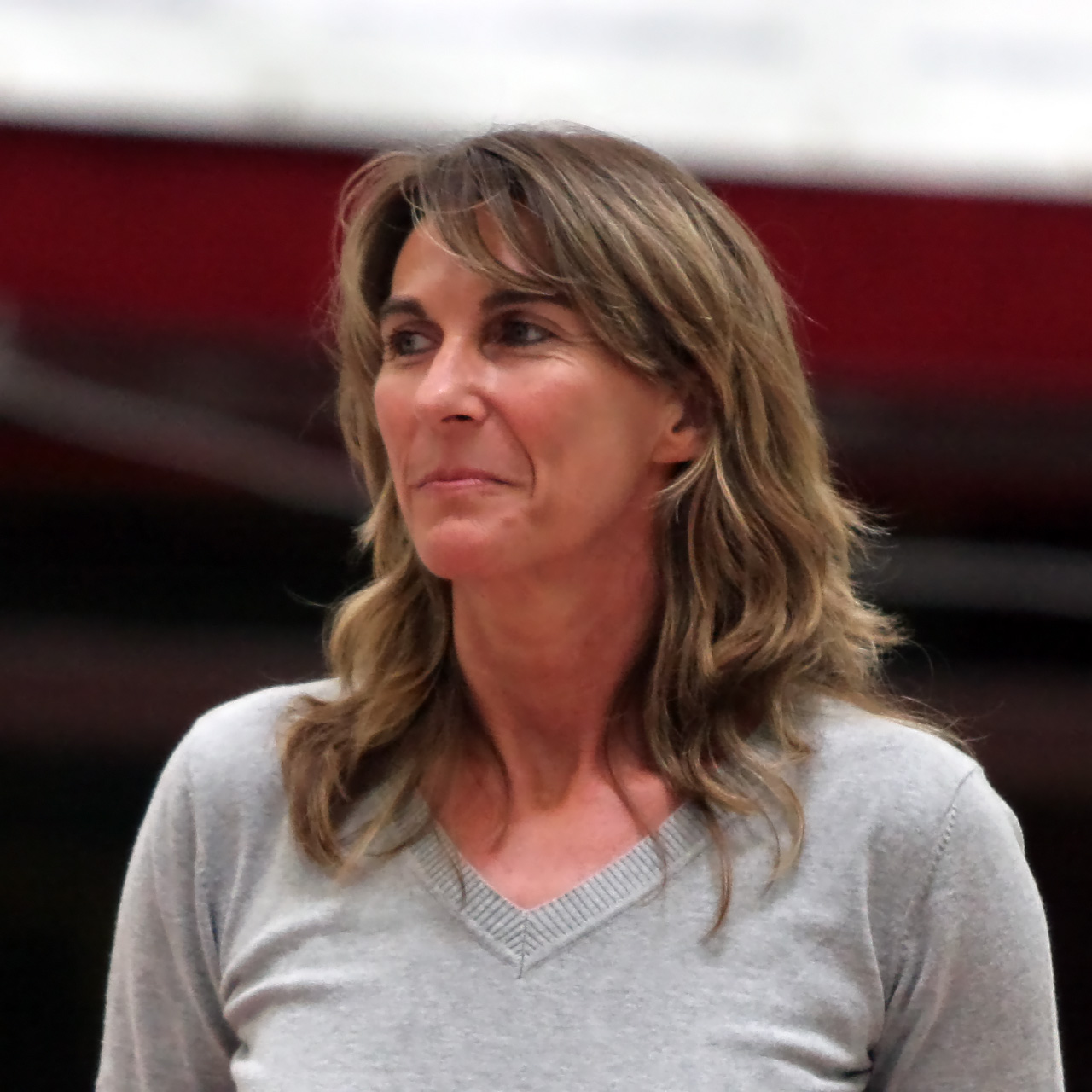
Silvia Schmitt, 2009

Silvia Schmitt (born 19 April 1962 Kempten, Bavaria) is a German handball player. She participated at the 1992 Summer Olympics, where the German national team placed fourth.
