= Alimata Douamba =

Ivorian handball player

Personal information
- Nationality: Ivorian
- Born: 23 August 1962 (age 63)

Sport
- Sport: Handball

Alimata Douamba (born 23 August 1962) is an Ivorian handball player. She competed in the women's tournament at the 1988 Summer Olympics.
