= Elena Grölz =

German handball player (1960–2025)

Elena Grölz (née Leonte; 26 July 1960 – 9 February 2025) was a Romanian-German handball player. She participated at the 1992 Summer Olympics, where the Germany national team placed fourth. Grölz died on 9 February 2025, at the age of 64.

== Honours ==
- 4× Romanian champion
- 3× Romanian Cup winner
- 3× German champion with TV Lützellinden
- 2× German Cup winner with TV Lützellinden
- 4× German League Top scorer in 1991, 1992, 1993 and 1995 with TV Mainzlar
- 3× German handballer of the Year in 1988, 1991 and 1992

== Sources ==
- Profile at sports-reference.com
