= Nam Eun-young =

South Korean handball player (born 1970)

Medal record

Representing South Korea

Women's handball

Olympic Games
Gold medal – first place	1992 Barcelona	Team

Asian Games
Gold medal – first place	1994 Hiroshima	

Nam Eun-Young (Korean: 남은영; born March 20, 1970), also spelled as Nam Eun-Yeong is a South Korean team handball player and Olympic champion. She received a gold medal at the 1992 Summer Olympics in Barcelona, with the Korean national team.

She also won a gold medal at the 1994 Asian Games.
