= Raquel Vizcaíno =

Spanish handball player (born 1967)

Personal information
- Full name: Raquel Vizcaíno Torre
- Nationality: Spanish
- Born: 22 June 1967 (age 59) Madrid Spain

Sport
- Sport: Handball
National team
- Years: Team
- –: Spain

Raquel Vizcaíno Torre (born 22 June 1967) is a Spanish team handball player who played for the club Vifirehati and for the Spanish national team. She was born in Madrid. She competed at the 1992 Summer Olympics in Barcelona, where the Spanish team placed seventh.
