= Alena Damitšová =

Slovak handball player (born 1962)

Personal information
- Nationality: Slovak
- Born: 16 February 1962 (age 63) Myjava, Czechoslovakia

Sport
- Country: Czechoslovakia
- Sport: Handball

Alena Damitšová (born 16 February 1962) is a Slovak handball player. She competed for Czechoslovakia in the women's tournament at the 1988 Summer Olympics.
