= Petra Lupačová =

Czech handball player

Personal information
- Nationality: Czech
- Born: 13 April 1968 Zlín, Czechoslovakia
- Died: 23 April 1994 (aged 26)

Sport
- Sport: Handball

Petra Lupačová (13 April 1968 – 23 April 1994) was a Czech handball player. She competed in the women's tournament at the 1988 Summer Olympics.
