= Attaher Mohamed El-Mahjoub =

Libyan table tennis player

Personal information
- Nationality: Libyan

Sport
- Sport: Table tennis

Attaher Mohamed El-Mahjoub is a Libyan table tennis player. He competed in the men's singles event at the 1992 Summer Olympics.
