= Mary Ihedioha =

Nigerian handball player (born 1962)

Personal information
- Nationality: Nigerian
- Born: 15 April 1962 (age 63)

Sport
- Sport: Handball

Mary Ihedioha (born 15 April 1962) is a Nigerian handball player. She competed in the women's tournament at the 1992 Summer Olympics.
