= Justina Akpulo =

Nigerian handball player (born 1972)

Personal information
- Nationality: Nigeria
- Born: 30 January 1972 (age 53)

Sport
- Sport: Handball

Justina Akpulo (born 30 January 1972) is a Nigerian handball player. She competed in the 1992 Summer Olympics.
