= Auta Olivia Sana =

Nigerian handball player (born 1970)

Personal information
- Nationality: Nigerian
- Born: 19 December 1970 (age 55)

Sport
- Sport: Handball

Auta Olivia Sana (born 19 December 1970) is a Nigerian handball player. She competed in the women's tournament at the 1992 Summer Olympics.
