= Uzoma Azuka =

Nigerian handball player (born 1970)

Personal information
- Nationality: Nigerian
- Born: 28 November 1970 (age 55)

Sport
- Sport: Handball

Uzoma Azuka (born 28 November 1970) is a Nigerian handball player. She competed in the women's tournament at the 1992 Summer Olympics.
