= Koko Elleingand =

Ivorian handball player

Personal information
- Nationality: Ivorian
- Born: 25 December 1971 (age 54)

Sport
- Sport: Handball

Koko Elleingand (born 25 December 1971) is an Ivorian handball player. She competed in the women's tournament at the 1988 Summer Olympics.
