= Brigitte Guigui =

Ivorian handball player

Personal information
- Nationality: Ivorian
- Born: 25 February 1968 (age 57)

Sport
- Sport: Handball

Brigitte Guigui (born 25 February 1968) is an Ivorian handball player. She competed in the women's tournament at the 1988 Summer Olympics.
