= Gouna Irie =

Ivorian handball player

Personal information
- Nationality: Ivorian
- Born: 15 May 1970 (age 55)

Sport
- Sport: Handball

Gouna Irie (born 15 May 1970) is an Ivorian handball player. She competed in the women's tournament at the 1988 Summer Olympics.
