= Kim In-ho (pentathlete) =

South Korean modern pentathlete (born 1970)

Personal information
- Born: 19 June 1970 (age 56)

Sport
- Sport: Modern pentathlon

Kim In-ho (born 19 June 1970) is a South Korean modern pentathlete. He competed at the 1992 Summer Olympics.
