= Zomou Awa =

Ivorian handball player

Personal information
- Nationality: Ivorian
- Born: 1 January 1967 (age 59)

Sport
- Sport: Handball

Zomou Awa (born 1 January 1967) is an Ivorian handball player. She competed in the women's tournament at the 1988 Summer Olympics.
