= Justina Anyiam =

Nigerian handball player (born 1972)

Personal information
- Nationality: Nigerian
- Born: 25 December 1972 (age 53)

Sport
- Sport: Handball

Justina Anyiam (born 25 December 1972) is a Nigerian handball player. She competed in the women's tournament at the 1992 Summer Olympics.
