= Dounbia Bah =

Ivorian handball player

Personal information
- Nationality: Ivorian
- Born: 15 November 1967 (age 58)

Sport
- Sport: Handball

Dounbia Bah (born 15 November 1967) is an Ivorian handball player. She competed in the women's tournament at the 1988 Summer Olympics.
