= Monika Hejtmánková =

Czech handball player

Personal information
- Nationality: Czech
- Born: 11 May 1967 (age 58) Olomouc, Czechoslovakia

Sport
- Sport: Handball

Monika Hejtmánková (born 11 May 1967) is a Czech handball player. She competed in the women's tournament at the 1988 Summer Olympics.
