= Carol Peterka =

American handball player

Personal information
- Full name: Carol Ann Peterka
- Born: December 23, 1963 (age 62) Little Falls, Minnesota, U.S.

Sport
- Sport: Handball

Carol Ann Peterka (born December 23, 1963) is an American former handball player who competed in the 1988 Summer Olympics, in the 1992 Summer Olympics, and in the 1996 Summer Olympics. Outside of her athletic career, Peterka was a teacher in Osceola County, Florida.
