= Wandou Guehi =

Ivorian handball player

Personal information
- Nationality: Ivorian
- Born: 15 December 1967 (age 58)

Sport
- Sport: Handball

Wandou Guehi (born 15 December 1967) is an Ivorian handball player. She competed in the women's tournament at the 1988 Summer Olympics.
