= Kerstin Knüpfer =

German handball player (born 1963)

Kerstin Knüpfer née Mühlner (born 12 April 1963 in Zwickau, East Germany) is a German handball player. She participated at the 1992 Summer Olympics, where the German national team placed fourth.

She played for BSV Sachsen Zwickau, SC Leipzig and VfB Leipzig and won national and international titles with these clubs.

She played 210 international matches for the GDR national team and the German national team, in which she scored 426 goals. She was third with the GDR selection at the 1990 World Cup. With the German team she took fourth place at the 1992 Olympics and won the silver medal at the 1994 European Championships.

After graduating from high school, Kerstin Knüpfer studied sport at the German University for Physical Culture in Leipzig.

Her daughter, Maxi Mühlner, is also a handball player and so was her husband, Frank Mühlner.
