= Angela Ajodo =

Nigerian handball player (born 1972)

Personal information
- Nationality: Nigeria
- Born: 30 December 1972 (age 53)

Sport
- Sport: Handball

Angela Ajodo (born 30 December 1972) is a Nigerian handball player. She competed in the 1992 Summer Olympics.
