= Karyn Palgut =

American handball player

Personal information
- Full name: Karyn Sue Palgut
- Born: December 10, 1962 (age 63) Cleveland, Ohio, U.S.

Sport
- Sport: Handball

Karyn Sue Palgut (born December 10, 1962) is an American former handball player who competed in the 1988 Summer Olympics and in the 1992 Summer Olympics.
