= Emilie Djoman =

Ivorian handball player

Personal information
- Nationality: Ivorian
- Born: 2 June 1959 (age 66)

Sport
- Sport: Handball

Emilie Djoman (born 2 June 1959) is an Ivorian handball player. She competed in the women's tournament at the 1988 Summer Olympics.
