= Lee Mi-young (handballer) =

South Korean handball player (born 1969)

Medal record

Women's handball

Representing South Korea

Olympic Games
Gold medal – first place	1988 Seoul	Team
Gold medal – first place	1992 Barcelona	Team

Asian Games
Gold medal – first place	1990 Beyjing	

Lee Mi-Young (born January 28, 1969) is a former South Korean team handball player and two-time Olympic gold medalist.

She participated at the 1988 Summer Olympics in Seoul and won a gold medal with the South Korean national team.

She competed at the 1992 Summer Olympics in Barcelona, where she again received a gold medal. At the 1992 Olympics Lee was ranked 3rd in goals, scoring 23 goals in 5 games, and she was eventually named to the All-Star Team of the competition.

She also won a gold medal with Korea at the 1990 Asian Games.

After the 1992 Olympics, she retired from professional handball and is currently working as a librarian in Ansan, Gyeonggi-do, South Korea.
