= Handball at the 1994 Asian Games – Women's tournament =

Women at the 1994 Asian Games
- Venue: Higashiku Sports Center
- Date: 5–13 October 1994
- Nations: 4

Medalists
gold medal	South Korea
silver medal	Japan
bronze medal	China

Women's handball at the 1994 Asian Games was held in Higashiku Sports Center, Hiroshima from October 5 to October 13, 1994.

== Results ==
All times are Japan Standard Time (UTC+09:00)

Pos	Team	Pld	W	D	L	GF	GA	GD	Pts
1	South Korea	3	3	0	0	116	66	+50	6
2	Japan	3	2	0	1	73	84	−11	4
3	China	3	1	0	2	77	86	−9	2
4	Kazakhstan	3	0	0	3	67	97	−30	0

Source: Results

5 October; 17:00	China	29–19	Kazakhstan	Higashiku Sports Center, Hiroshima
5 October; 17:00		(16–8)		Higashiku Sports Center, Hiroshima

7 October; 9:00	South Korea	40–22	China	Higashiku Sports Center, Hiroshima
7 October; 9:00		(16–11)		Higashiku Sports Center, Hiroshima

7 October; 18:30	Japan	26–24	Kazakhstan	Higashiku Sports Center, Hiroshima
7 October; 18:30		(17–10)		Higashiku Sports Center, Hiroshima

9 October; 16:30	Kazakhstan	24–42	South Korea	Higashiku Sports Center, Hiroshima
9 October; 16:30		(9–25)		Higashiku Sports Center, Hiroshima

11 October; 18:30	China	26–27	Japan	Higashiku Sports Center, Hiroshima
11 October; 18:30		(14–11)		Higashiku Sports Center, Hiroshima

13 October; 16:30	Japan	20–34	South Korea	Higashiku Sports Center, Hiroshima
13 October; 16:30		(12–16)		Higashiku Sports Center, Hiroshima

== Final standing ==
Rank	Team	Pld	W	D	L
1st place, gold medalist(s)	South Korea	3	3	0	0
2nd place, silver medalist(s)	Japan	3	2	0	1
3rd place, bronze medalist(s)	China	3	1	0	2
4	Kazakhstan	3	0	0	3
