= Leora Jones =

American handball player

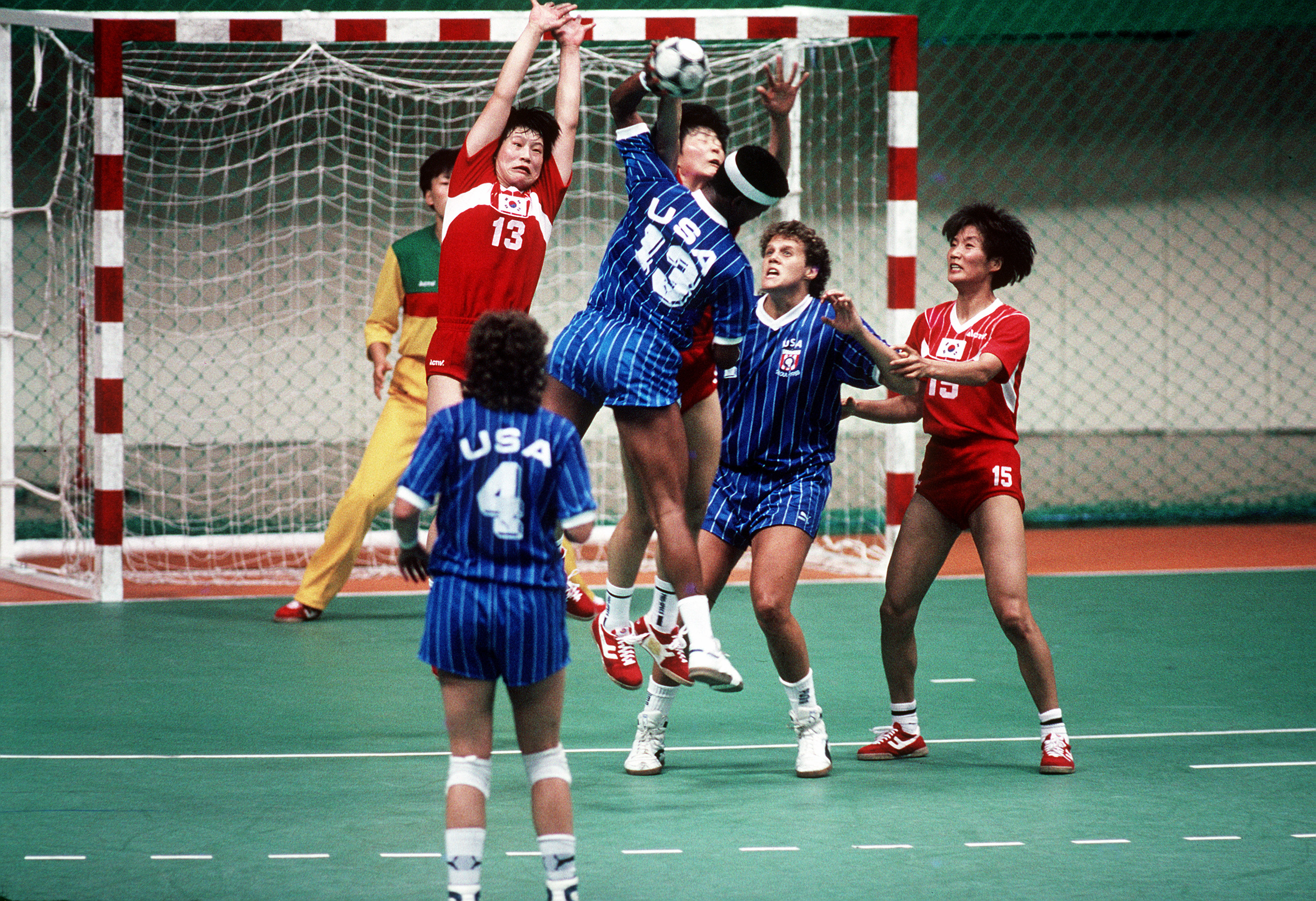
- Shot of Leora Jones (#13) in blue, during the 1988 Summer Olympics

Personal information
- Full name: Leora Sam Jones
- Born: 11 August 1960 (age 66) Mount Olive, North Carolina, United States
- Height: 172 cm (68 in)

Sport
- Sport: Handball

Senior clubs
- Years: Team
- –: Hypo Niederösterreich
- 1985–1986: Bayer Leverkusen
National team
- Years: Team
- –: United States

Leora "Sam" Jones (born August 11, 1960) is an American former handball player who competed three times at the Olympics, in 1984, in 1988, and in 1992.

Jones first was a basketball player at East Carolina University in Greenville, North Carolina, averaging 16 points/game during her career for the Pirates. She then became an assistant coach for East Carolina when she was invited to US team handball tryouts.

Between the 1984 and 1988 Olympics, Jones played in Europe, with Hypobank in Austria in 1985 and with Bayer Leverkusen in Germany, helping them win the German Championship in 1986. Jones also competed at the Pan American Games in 1987, winning a gold medal. During her career Jones was voted US Team Handball Federation Player of the Year three times. She later worked in Raleigh, North Carolina for United Parcel Service (UPS).
