= Natalya Morskova =

Russian handball player (born 1966)

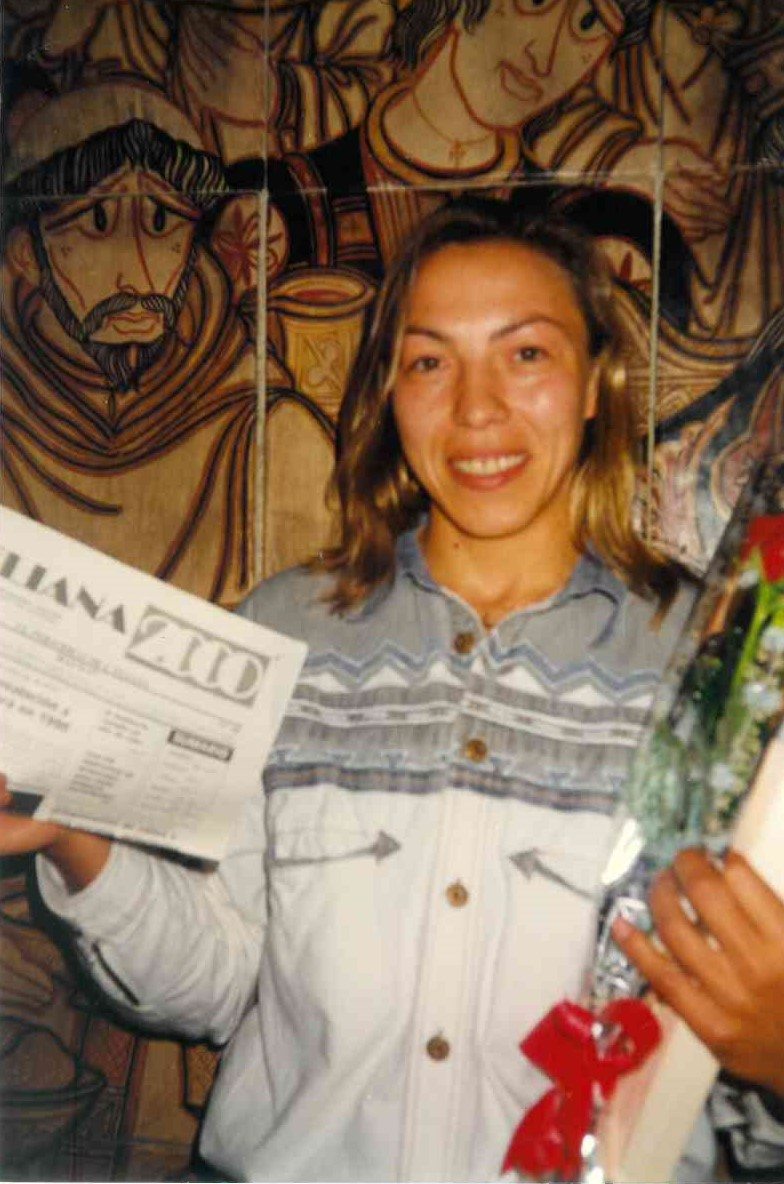

Personal information
- Full name: Natalya Gennadyevna Morskova
- Nationality: Soviet/Russian/Spanish
- Born: 17 January 1966 (age 60) Rostov-on-Don, Soviet Union
- Height: 1.86 m (6 ft 1 in)

Sport
- Sport: Handball
- Position: Left Back

Senior clubs
- Years: Team
- 1983–1991: Rostselmash Rostov
- 1991–2005: CB Mar Valencia
National team
Years	Team		
–1992	Soviet Union		
1992–1992	Unified Team at the Olympics		
–	Russia		
1998–2002	Spain	49	(396)

Teams managed
- 2012–2013: Valencia Aicequip
Medal record
Representing the Soviet Union
Olympic Games
Bronze medal – third place	1988 Seoul	Team
World Championship
Gold medal – first place	1986 Netherlands	Team
Gold medal – first place	1990 South Korea	Team
Representing the Unified Team
Olympic Games
Bronze medal – third place	1992 Barcelona	Team

Natalya Gennadyevna Morskova, née Kirtchik (Russian: Наталья Геннадьевна Морскова; born January 17, 1966) is a Russian former handball player who competed for the Soviet Union in the 1988 Summer Olympics and for the Unified Team in the 1992 Summer Olympics.

In 1988 she won the bronze medal with the Soviet team. She played all five matches and scored 25 goals.

Four years later she was a member of the Unified Team which won the bronze medal. She played all five matches and scored 41 goals.

At the 1986 World Championship she was the top scorer with 61 goals.

She later represented Spain in international championships.

== See also ==
- List of women's handballers with 1000 or more international goals
