= Handball at the 1992 Summer Olympics – Women's tournament =

1992 Women's Olympic handball tournament
Tournament details
- Host country: Spain
- Venue(s): Palau d'Esports de Granollers; Palau Sant Jordi
- Dates: 30 July – 8 August 1992
- Teams: 8 (from 4 confederations)

Final positions
- Champions: South Korea (2nd title)
- Runners-up: Norway
- Third place: Unified Team
- Fourth place: Germany

Tournament statistics
- Matches played: 18
- Goals scored: 802 (44.56 per match)
- Top scorers: Natalya Morskova (EUN) (41 goals)

The women's handball tournament at the 1992 Summer Olympics was contested by eight teams divided in two groups, with the top two proceeding to the semifinals and the bottom two proceeding to placement matches.

== Qualification ==
Mean of qualification	Date	Host	Vacancies	Qualified
Host nation	17 October 1986	(Switzerland) Lausanne	1	Spain
1990 World Championship	24 November – 4 December 1990	South Korea	4	Unified Team; Germany; Austria; Norway
1991 Asian Championship	22–31 August 1991	(Japan) Hiroshima	1	South Korea
1991 African Championship	6–13 September 1991	(Egypt) Cairo	1	Nigeria
1991 Pan American Championship	30 September – 6 October 1991	(Brazil) Maringá	1	United States
Total			8	

== Preliminary round ==
=== Group A ===
Pos	Team	Pld	W	D	L	GF	GA	GD	Pts	Qualification
1	Unified Team	3	3	0	0	77	56	+21	6	Semifinals
2	Germany	3	2	0	1	86	61	+25	4	Semifinals
3	United States	3	1	0	2	55	76	−21	2	Fifth place game
4	Nigeria	3	0	0	3	56	81	−25	0	Seventh place game

30 July 1992; 10:00	Germany	32–17	Nigeria	Palau d'Esports de Granollers, Granollers; Referees: Øie, Høgsnes (NOR)
30 July 1992; 10:00	Mühlner 9	(14–9)	Sana 7	Palau d'Esports de Granollers, Granollers; Referees: Øie, Høgsnes (NOR)

30 July 1992; 15:00	Unified Team	23–16	United States	Palau d'Esports de Granollers, Granollers; Referees: Gallego, Lamas (ESP)
30 July 1992; 15:00	Morskova 8	(14–9)	Peterka 4	Palau d'Esports de Granollers, Granollers; Referees: Gallego, Lamas (ESP)

1 August 1992; 10:00	Nigeria	18–26	Unified Team	Palau d'Esports de Granollers, Granollers; Referees: Goto, Shimada (JPN)
1 August 1992; 10:00	Sana 8	(5–15)	Horb, Morskova 5	Palau d'Esports de Granollers, Granollers; Referees: Goto, Shimada (JPN)

1 August 1992; 15:00	United States	16–32	Germany	Palau d'Esports de Granollers, Granollers; Referees: Convents, Xhonneux (BEL)
1 August 1992; 15:00	Jones 7	(6–16)	Fittinger, Leonte 8	Palau d'Esports de Granollers, Granollers; Referees: Convents, Xhonneux (BEL)

3 August 1992; 10:00	United States	23–21	Nigeria	Palau d'Esports de Granollers, Granollers; Referees: Christensen, Jørgensen (DEN)
3 August 1992; 10:00	Jones 8	(12–9)	Abi 10	Palau d'Esports de Granollers, Granollers; Referees: Christensen, Jørgensen (DEN)

3 August 1992; 16:30	Unified Team	28–22	Germany	Palau d'Esports de Granollers, Granollers; Referees: Rudin, Schill (SUI)
3 August 1992; 16:30	Morskova 14	(14–13)	Ciszewski 5	Palau d'Esports de Granollers, Granollers; Referees: Rudin, Schill (SUI)

=== Group B ===
Pos	Team	Pld	W	D	L	GF	GA	GD	Pts	Qualification
1	South Korea	3	2	1	0	82	61	+21	5	Semifinals
2	Norway	3	2	0	1	55	60	−5	4	Semifinals
3	Austria	3	1	1	1	64	62	+2	3	Fifth place game
4	Spain (H)	3	0	0	3	50	68	−18	0	Seventh place game

(H) Hosts

30 July 1992; 11:30	Austria	20–16	Spain	Palau d'Esports de Granollers, Granollers; Referees: Johansson, Kjellkvist (SWE)
30 July 1992; 11:30	Kolar 5	(9–4)	Vizcaíno 6	Palau d'Esports de Granollers, Granollers; Referees: Johansson, Kjellkvist (SWE)

30 July 1992; 16:30	Norway	16–27	South Korea	Palau d'Esports de Granollers, Granollers; Referees: Szajna, Wróblewski (POL)
30 July 1992; 16:30	Eftedal 4	(11–13)	Lim 9	Palau d'Esports de Granollers, Granollers; Referees: Szajna, Wróblewski (POL)

1 August 1992; 11:30	Spain	16–20	Norway	Palau d'Esports de Granollers, Granollers; Referees: Guterman (LTU), Taranukhin (RUS)
1 August 1992; 11:30	Vizcaíno 6	(7–9)	Goksør, Svendsen 5	Palau d'Esports de Granollers, Granollers; Referees: Guterman (LTU), Taranukhin (RUS)

1 August 1992; 16:30	South Korea	27–27	Austria	Palau d'Esports de Granollers, Granollers; Referees: Thomas, Thomas (GER)
1 August 1992; 16:30	Lim, Oh 6	(12–12)	Kolar 11	Palau d'Esports de Granollers, Granollers; Referees: Thomas, Thomas (GER)

3 August 1992; 11:30	Norway	19–17	Austria	Palau d'Esports de Granollers, Granollers; Referees: Lelong, Tancrez (FRA)
3 August 1992; 11:30	Sagstuen, Svendsen 4	(9–10)	Matei 7	Palau d'Esports de Granollers, Granollers; Referees: Lelong, Tancrez (FRA)

3 August 1992; 15:00	South Korea	28–18	Spain	Palau d'Esports de Granollers, Granollers; Referees: Jug, Jeglič (SLO)
3 August 1992; 15:00	Lee M. 7	(15–7)	three players 4	Palau d'Esports de Granollers, Granollers; Referees: Jug, Jeglič (SLO)

== Playoffs ==
=== Bracket ===
Semifinals
6 August
Unified Team	23
Norway	24
6 August
South Korea	26
Germany	25

Gold medal
8 August
Norway	21
South Korea	28
Bronze medal
8 August
Germany	20
Unified Team	24

=== Semifinals ===
6 August 1992; 14:00	Unified Team	23–24	Norway	Palau d'Esports de Granollers, Granollers; Referees: Jug, Jeglič (SLO)
6 August 1992; 14:00	Morskova 8	(11–12)	Sundal, Svendsen 6	Palau d'Esports de Granollers, Granollers; Referees: Jug, Jeglič (SLO)

6 August 1992; 16:00	South Korea	26–25	Germany	Palau d'Esports de Granollers, Granollers; Referees: Christensen, Jørgensen (DEN)
6 August 1992; 16:00	Lim, Nam 5	(17–13)	Schmitt 7	Palau d'Esports de Granollers, Granollers; Referees: Christensen, Jørgensen (DEN)

=== Seventh place game ===
7 August 1992; 09:00	Spain	26–17	Nigeria	Palau d'Esports de Granollers, Granollers; Referees: Goto, Shimada (JPN)
7 August 1992; 09:00	Gómez 7	(14–5)	Abi, Anyiam 4	Palau d'Esports de Granollers, Granollers; Referees: Goto, Shimada (JPN)

=== Fifth place game ===
7 August 1992; 11:00	United States	17–26	Austria	Palau d'Esports de Granollers, Granollers; Referees: Convents, Xhonneux (BEL)
7 August 1992; 11:00	Cain 5	(6–11)	Matei 7	Palau d'Esports de Granollers, Granollers; Referees: Convents, Xhonneux (BEL)

=== Bronze medal game ===
8 August 1992; 10:00	Germany	20–24	Unified Team	Palau Sant Jordi, Barcelona; Referees: Johansson, Kjellkvist (SWE)
8 August 1992; 10:00	Leonte, Wagner 6	(9–10)	Morskova 6	Palau Sant Jordi, Barcelona; Referees: Johansson, Kjellkvist (SWE)

=== Gold medal game ===
8 August 1992; 12:00	Norway	21–28	South Korea	Palau Sant Jordi, Barcelona; Referees: Thomas, Thomas (GER)
8 August 1992; 12:00	Sundal 7	(8–16)	Lim 8	Palau Sant Jordi, Barcelona; Referees: Thomas, Thomas (GER)

== Rankings and statistics ==
Final rankings
1	South Korea
2	Norway
3	Unified Team
4	Germany
5	Austria
6	United States
7	Spain
8	Nigeria

Top goalscorers
Player	Games	Goals	Attempts
1. Natalya Morskova (EUN)	5	41	61
2. Lim O-kyeong (KOR)	5	30	43
3. Jasna Kolar-Merdan (AUT)	4	23	40
3. Lee Mi-Young (KOR)	5	23	36
5. Silvia Schmitt (GER)	5	22	41
6. Heidi Sundal (NOR)	5	21	32
7. Oh Seong-ok (KOR)	5	20	44
8. Auta Olivia Sana (NGR)	3	19	36
8. Maryna Bazanova (EUN)	5	19	26

All-star team
Marianna Racz (AUT)
Maryna Bazhanova (EUN)	Silvia Schmitt (GER)	Natalya Morskova (EUN)
Lee Mi-Young (KOR)	Lim O-Kyeong (KOR)	Heidi Sundal (NOR)
