= Rowing at the 1988 Summer Olympics – Women's coxed four =

Women's coxed four at the Games of the XXIV Olympiad
- Date: 19–24 September 1988
- Competitors: 55 from 10 nations

Medalists
1st place, gold medalist(s)		Martina Walther; Gerlinde Doberschütz; Carola Hornig; Birte Siech; Sylvia Rose	East Germany
2nd place, silver medalist(s)		Zhang Xianghua; Hu Yadong; Yang Xiao; Zhou Shouying; Li Ronghua	China
3rd place, bronze medalist(s)		Marioara Trașcă; Veronica Necula; Herta Anitaș; Doina Șnep-Bălan; Ecaterina Oancia	Romania

The women's coxed four competition at the 1988 Summer Olympics took place at took place at Han River Regatta Course, South Korea.

== Competition format ==
The competition consisted of two main rounds (heats and finals) as well as a repechage. The 10 boats were divided into two heats for the first round, with 5 boats in each heat. The winner of each heat (2 boats total) advanced directly to the "A" final (for 1st through 6th place). The remaining 8 boats were placed in the repechage. The repechage featured two heats, with 4 boats in each heat. The top two boats in each repechage heat (4 boats total) advanced to the "A" final. The remaining 4 boats (3rd and 4th placers in the repechage heats) were eliminated from medal contention and competed in the "B" final for 7th through 10th place.

All races were over a 2000 metre course, unlike previous Games in which women used a 1000 metre course.

== Results ==
=== Heats ===
==== Heat 1 ====
Rank	Rowers	Coxswain	Nation	Time	Notes
1	Gerlinde Doberschütz; Carola Hornig; Birte Siech; Martina Walther	Sylvia Rose	East Germany	7:11.01	QA
2	Olya Stoichkova; Mariana Stoyanova; Katia Todorova; Teodora Zareva; Violeta Zareva	Greta Georgieva	Bulgaria	7:11.59	R
3	Hu Yadong; Yang Xiao; Zhang Xianghua; Zhou Shouying	Li Ronghua	China	7:17.15	R
4	Heather Clarke; Tricia Smith; Jane Tregunno; Jennifer Walinga	Lesley Thompson-Willie	Canada	7:31.02	R
5	Gang Min-heung; Guk In-suk; Lee Gwang-sun; Park Mi-jeong	Nam Sang-ran	South Korea	8:09.58	R

==== Heat 2 ====
Rank	Rowers	Coxswain	Nation	Time	Notes
1	Mihaela Armasescu; Adriana Bazon; Doina Șnep-Bălan; Marioara Trașcă	Ecaterina Oancia	Romania	7:21.43	QA
2	Reda Ribinskaitė; Marina Suprun; Elena Tereshina; Irina Teterina	Valentina Khokhlova	Soviet Union	7:28.73	R
3	Elżbieta Jankowska; Czesława Kościańska-Szczepińska; Elwira Lorenz; Zyta Jarka	Grażyna Błąd	Poland	7:29.72	R
4	Elizabeth Bradley; Jennifer Corbet; Cynthia Eckert; Sarah Gengler	Kim Santiago	United States	7:33.42	R
5	Joanne Gough; Kate Grose; Fiona Johnston; Susan Smith	Alison Norrish	Great Britain	7:38.01	R

=== Repechage ===
==== Repechage heat 1 ====
Rank	Rowers	Coxswain	Nation	Time	Notes
1	Svetla Durchova; Miglena Mikhaleva; Teodora Zareva; Violeta Zareva	Greta Georgieva	Bulgaria	7:20.78	QA
2	Joanne Gough; Kate Grose; Fiona Johnston; Susan Smith	Alison Norrish	Great Britain	7:25.63	QA
3	Heather Clarke; Tricia Smith; Jane Tregunno; Jennifer Walinga	Lesley Thompson-Willie	Canada	7:29.71	QB
4	Elżbieta Jankowska; Czesława Kościańska-Szczepińska; Elwira Lorenz; Zyta Jarka	Grażyna Błąd	Poland	7:32.55	QB

==== Repechage heat 2 ====
Rank	Rowers	Coxswain	Nation	Time	Notes
1	Hu Yadong; Yang Xiao; Zhang Xianghua; Zhou Shouying	Li Ronghua	China	7:23.80	QA
2	Elizabeth Bradley; Jennifer Corbet; Cynthia Eckert; Sarah Gengler	Kim Santiago	United States	7:28.01	QA
3	Reda Ribinskaitė; Marina Suprun; Elena Tereshina; Irina Teterina	Valentina Khokhlova	Soviet Union	7:35.22	QB
4	Gang Min-heung; Guk In-suk; Lee Gwang-sun; Park Mi-jeong	Nam Sang-ran	South Korea	8:13.07	QB

=== Finals ===
==== Final B ====
Rank	Rowers	Coxswain	Nation	Time
7	Heather Clarke; Tricia Smith; Jane Tregunno; Jennifer Walinga	Lesley Thompson-Willie	Canada	7:19.86
8	Elżbieta Jankowska; Czesława Kościańska-Szczepińska; Elwira Lorenz; Zyta Jarka	Grażyna Błąd	Poland	7:22.59
9	Reda Ribinskaitė; Marina Suprun; Elena Tereshina; Irina Teterina	Valentina Khokhlova	Soviet Union	7:27.20
10	Gang Min-heung; Guk In-suk; Lee Gwang-sun; Park Mi-jeong	Nam Sang-ran	South Korea	8:07.71

==== Final A ====
Rank	Rowers	Coxswain	Nation	Time	Notes
1st place, gold medalist(s)	Gerlinde Doberschütz; Carola Hornig; Birte Siech; Martina Walther	Sylvia Rose	East Germany	6:56.00	OB
2nd place, silver medalist(s)	Hu Yadong; Yang Xiao; Zhang Xianghua; Zhou Shouying	Li Ronghua	China	6:58.78	
3rd place, bronze medalist(s)	Herta Anitaș; Veronica Necula; Doina Șnep-Bălan; Marioara Trașcă	Ecaterina Oancia	Romania	7:01.13	
4	Svetla Durchova; Miglena Mikhaleva; Teodora Zareva; Violeta Zareva	Greta Georgieva	Bulgaria	7:02.27	
5	Elizabeth Bradley; Jennifer Corbet; Cynthia Eckert; Sarah Gengler	Kim Santiago	United States	7:09.12	
6	Joanne Gough; Kate Grose; Fiona Johnston; Susan Smith	Alison Norrish	Great Britain	7:10.80	

== Final classification ==
Rank	Rowers	Nation
1st place, gold medalist(s)	Martina Walther; Gerlinde Doberschütz; Carola Hornig; Birte Siech; Sylvia Rose	East Germany
2nd place, silver medalist(s)	Zhang Xianghua; Hu Yadong; Yang Xiao; Zhou Shouying; Li Ronghua	China
3rd place, bronze medalist(s)	Marioara Trașcă; Veronica Necula; Herta Anitaș; Doina Șnep-Bălan; Ecaterina Oancia; Mihaela Armasescu (heats); Adriana Bazon (heats)	Romania
4	Teodora Zareva; Violeta Zareva; Miglena Mikhaleva; Svetla Durchova; Greta Georgieva; Olya Stoichkova (heats); Mariana Stoyanova (heats); Katia Todorova (heats)	Bulgaria
5	Jennifer Corbet; Sarah Gengler; Elizabeth Bradley; Cynthia Eckert; Kim Santiago	United States
6	Fiona Johnston; Kate Grose; Joanne Gough; Susan Smith; Alison Norrish	Great Britain
7	Heather Clarke; Tricia Smith; Lesley Thompson-Willie; Jane Tregunno; Jennifer Walinga	Canada
8	Grażyna Błąd; Elżbieta Jankowska; Zyta Jarka; Elwira Lorenz; Czesława Kościańska-Szczepińska	Poland
9	Valentina Khokhlova; Reda Ribinskaitė; Elena Tereshina; Irina Teterina; Marina Suprun	Soviet Union
10	Gang Min-heung; Guk In-suk; Lee Gwang-sun; Nam Sang-ran; Park Mi-jeong	South Korea
