= Rowing at the 1988 Summer Olympics – Women's eight =

Women's eight at the Games of the XXIV Olympiad
- Date: 20–25 September 1988
- Competitors: 63 from 7 nations

Medalists
1st place, gold medalist(s)		Annegret Strauch; Judith Zeidler; Kathrin Haacker; Ute Wild; Anja Kluge; Beatrix Schröer; Ramona Balthasar; Ute Stange; Daniela Neunast	East Germany
2nd place, silver medalist(s)		Doina Șnep-Bălan; Veronica Necula; Herta Anitaș; Marioara Trașcă; Adriana Bazon; Mihaela Armășescu; Rodica Arba; Olga Homeghi; Ecaterina Oancia	Romania
3rd place, bronze medalist(s)		Zhou Xiuhua; Zhang Yali; He Yanwen; Han Yaqin; Zhang Xianghua; Zhou Shouying; Yang Xiao; Hu Yadong; Li Ronghua	China

The women's eight competition at the 1988 Summer Olympics took place at took place at Han River Regatta Course, South Korea.

== Competition format ==
The competition consisted of two main rounds (heats and a final) as well as a repechage. The 7 boats were divided into two heats for the first round, with 4 boats in one heat and 3 boats in the other. The winner of each heat (2 boats total) advanced directly to the final (for 1st through 6th place). The remaining 5 boats were placed in the repechage. The repechage featured a single heat. The top four boats advanced to the final; only the last-place boat in the repechage was eliminated (and took 7th place overall, with no need for a "B" final because only one boat did not reach the "A" final).

All races were over a 2000 metre course, unlike previous Games in which women used a 1000 metre course.

== Results ==
=== Heats ===
==== Heat 1 ====
Rank	Rowers	Coxswain	Nation	Time	Notes
1	Herta Anitaș; Rodica Arba; Mihaela Armășescu; Adriana Bazon; Olga Homeghi; Veronica Necula; Doina Șnep-Bălan; Marioara Trașcă	Ecaterina Oancia	Romania	6:15.65	Q
2	Ramona Balthasar; Kathrin Haacker; Anja Kluge; Ute Schell; Beatrix Schröer; Annegret Strauch; Ute Wild; Judith Zeidler	Daniela Neunast	East Germany	6:16.29	R
3	Inge Althoff-Schwerzmann; Meike Holländer; Elke Markwort; Gabriele Mehl; Cerstin Petersmann; Katrin Petersmann; Kerstin Rehders; Anja Schäfer	Kerstin Peters	West Germany	6:38.31	R
4	Nevyana Ivanova; Daniela Oronova; Olya Stoichkova; Mariana Stoyanova; Rita Todorova; Todorka Vasileva; Teodora Zareva; Violeta Zareva	Greta Georgieva	Bulgaria	6:47.99	R

==== Heat 2 ====
Rank	Rowers	Coxswain	Nation	Time	Notes
1	Lidiya Averyanova; Sandra Brazauskaitė; Nataliya Fedorenko; Olena Pukhaieva; Nadezhda Sugako; Margarita Teselko; Sariya Zakyrova; Marina Znak	Aušra Gudeliūnaitė	Soviet Union	6:20.90	Q
2	Han Yaqin; He Yanwen; Hu Yadong; Yang Xiao; Zhang Xianghua; Zhang Yali; Zhou Shouying; Zhou Xiuhua	Li Ronghua	China	6:23.33	R
3	Susan Broome; Christine Campbell; Peg Mallery; Stephanie Maxwell-Pierson; Abby Peck; Anna Seaton; Alison Townley; Juliet Thompson	Betsy Beard	United States	6:24.55	R

=== Repechage ===
Rank	Rowers	Coxswain	Nation	Time	Notes
1	Ramona Balthasar; Kathrin Haacker; Anja Kluge; Ute Schell; Beatrix Schröer; Annegret Strauch; Ute Wild; Judith Zeidler	Daniela Neunast	East Germany	6:05.50	Q
2	Nevyana Ivanova; Daniela Oronova; Olya Stoichkova; Mariana Stoyanova; Rita Todorova; Todorka Vasileva; Teodora Zareva; Violeta Zareva	Greta Georgieva	Bulgaria	6:08.26	Q
3	Han Yaqin; He Yanwen; Hu Yadong; Yang Xiao; Zhang Xianghua; Zhang Yali; Zhou Shouying; Zhou Xiuhua	Li Ronghua	China	6:08.64	Q
4	Susan Broome; Christine Campbell; Peg Mallery; Stephanie Maxwell-Pierson; Abby Peck; Anna Seaton; Alison Townley; Juliet Thompson	Betsy Beard	United States	6:10.82	Q
5	Inge Althoff-Schwerzmann; Meike Holländer; Elke Markwort; Gabriele Mehl; Cerstin Petersmann; Katrin Petersmann; Kerstin Rehders; Anja Schäfer	Kerstin Peters	West Germany	6:12.70	

=== Final ===
Rank	Rowers	Coxswain	Nation	Time
1st place, gold medalist(s)	Ramona Balthasar; Kathrin Haacker; Anja Kluge; Ute Schell; Beatrix Schröer; Annegret Strauch; Ute Wild; Judith Zeidler	Daniela Neunast	East Germany	6:15.17
2nd place, silver medalist(s)	Herta Anitaș; Rodica Arba; Mihaela Armășescu; Adriana Bazon; Olga Homeghi; Veronica Necula; Doina Șnep-Bălan; Marioara Trașcă	Ecaterina Oancia	Romania	6:17.44
3rd place, bronze medalist(s)	Han Yaqin; He Yanwen; Hu Yadong; Yang Xiao; Zhang Xianghua; Zhang Yali; Zhou Shouying; Zhou Xiuhua	Li Ronghua	China	6:21.83
4	Lidiya Averyanova; Sandra Brazauskaitė; Nataliya Fedorenko; Olena Pukhaieva; Nadezhda Sugako; Margarita Teselko; Sariya Zakyrova; Marina Znak	Aušra Gudeliūnaitė	Soviet Union	6:22.35
5	Nevyana Ivanova; Daniela Oronova; Olya Stoichkova; Mariana Stoyanova; Rita Todorova; Todorka Vasileva; Teodora Zareva; Violeta Zareva	Greta Georgieva	Bulgaria	6:25.02
6	Susan Broome; Christine Campbell; Peg Mallery; Stephanie Maxwell-Pierson; Abby Peck; Anna Seaton; Alison Townley; Juliet Thompson	Betsy Beard	United States	6:26.66

== Final classification ==
Rank	Rowers	Nation
1st place, gold medalist(s)	Annegret Strauch; Judith Zeidler; Kathrin Haacker; Ute Wild; Anja Kluge; Beatrix Schröer; Ramona Balthasar; Ute Stange; Daniela Neunast	East Germany
2nd place, silver medalist(s)	Doina Șnep-Bălan; Veronica Necula; Herta Anitaș; Marioara Trașcă; Adriana Bazon; Mihaela Armășescu; Rodica Arba; Olga Homeghi; Ecaterina Oancia	Romania
3rd place, bronze medalist(s)	Zhou Xiuhua; Zhang Yali; He Yanwen; Han Yaqin; Zhang Xianghua; Zhou Shouying; Yang Xiao; Hu Yadong; Li Ronghua	China
4	Margarita Teselko; Marina Znak; Nadezhda Sugako; Sandra Brazauskaitė; Olena Pukhaieva; Sariya Zakyrova; Nataliya Fedorenko; Lidiya Averyanova; Aušra Gudeliūnaitė	Soviet Union
5	Teodora Zareva; Violeta Zareva; Nevyana Ivanova; Olya Stoichkova; Todorka Vasileva; Rita Todorova; Mariana Stoyanova; Daniela Oronova; Greta Georgieva	Bulgaria
6	Juliet Thompson; Christine Campbell; Abby Peck; Peg Mallery; Susan Broome; Stephanie Maxwell-Pierson; Anna Seaton; Alison Townley; Betsy Beard	United States
7	Inge Althoff-Schwerzmann; Meike Holländer; Elke Markwort; Gabriele Mehl; Kerstin Peters; Cerstin Petersmann; Katrin Petersmann; Kerstin Rehders; Anja Schäfer	West Germany
