= List of Olympic best times in rowing =

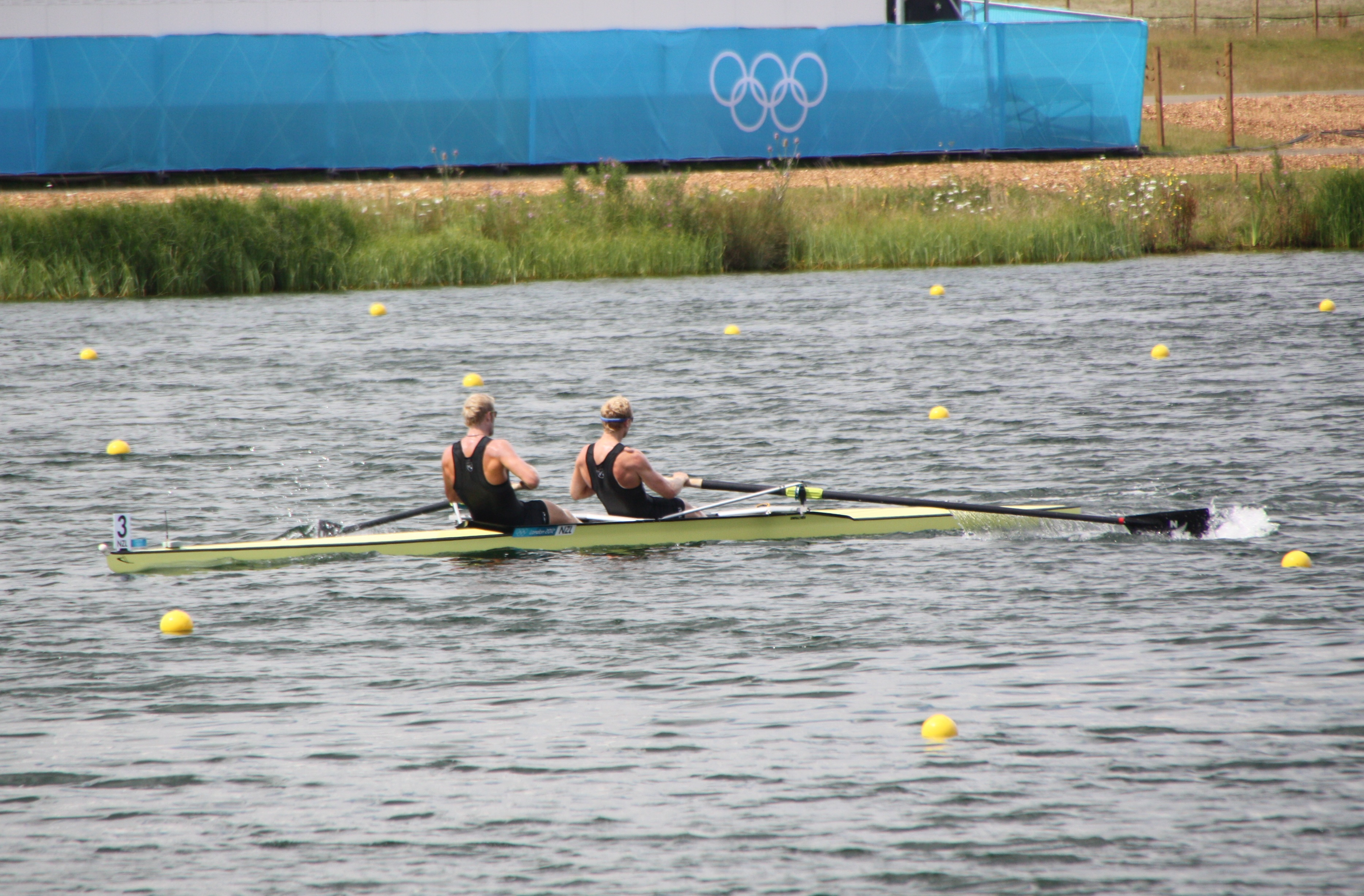
Hamish Bond and Murray at the 2012 London Olympics, where they broke the world best time in the coxless pair

In rowing, there are no world records due to the variability of weather conditions. Instead there are world best times, which are set over the international rowing distance of 2000 meters.

== Men's records ==
† denotes a performance that is also a current world best time.

Event	Record	Athlete(s)	Country	Games	Date	Ref(s).
Past events
Coxed four – Inriggers (Note: Coxed four with inriggers was only held once (1912).)	7:39.2	Ture Rosvall; William Bruhn-Möller; Conrad Brunkman; Herman Dahlbäck; Leo Wilkens	Sweden	1912 Stockholm	17 July 1912	
Coxed pair	6:49.83	Greg Searle; Jonny Searle; Garry Herbert (Coxswain)	Great Britain	1992 Barcelona	2 August 1992	
Coxed four	5:59.37	Iulică Ruican; Viorel Talapan; Dimitrie Popescu; Nicolae Țaga; Dumitru Răducanu (Coxswain)	Romania	1992 Barcelona	1 August 1992	
Lightweight coxless four	5:47.76	Thomas Ebert; Morten Jørgensen; Eskild Ebbesen; Mads Andersen	Denmark	2008 Beijing	17 August 2008	
Current events
Single sculls	6:35.77	Oliver Zeidler	Germany	2024 Paris	1 August 2024	
Double sculls	6:00.33	Hugo Boucheron; Matthieu Androdias	France	2020 Tokyo	28 July 2021	
Quadruple sculls	5:32.03^{†}	Dirk Uittenbogaard; Abe Wiersma; Tone Wieten; Koen Metsemakers	Netherlands	2020 Tokyo	28 July 2021	
Coxless pair	6:08.50^{†}	Eric Murray; Hamish Bond	New Zealand	2012 London	28 July 2012	
Coxless four	5:42.76	Alexander Purnell; Spencer Turrin; Jack Hargreaves; Alexander Hill	Australia	2020 Tokyo	28 July 2021	
Eight	5:19.85	Jason Read; Wyatt Allen; Chris Ahrens; Joseph Hansen; Matt Deakin; Dan Beery; Beau Hoopman; Bryan Volpenhein; Peter Cipollone (Coxswain)	United States	2004 Athens	15 August 2004	
Lightweight double sculls	6:05.33^{†}	Fintan McCarthy; Paul O'Donovan	Ireland	2020 Tokyo	28 July 2021	

== Women's records ==
† denotes a performance that is also a current world best time.

Event	Record	Athlete(s)	Country	Games	Date	Ref(s).
Past events
Coxed four	6:56.00	Gerlinde Doberschütz; Carola Hornig; Birte Siech; Martina Walther; Sylvia Rose (Coxswain)	East Germany	1988 Seoul	24 September 1988	
Current events
Single sculls	7:13.97	Emma Twigg	New Zealand	2020 Tokyo	30 July 2021	
Double sculls	6:41.03	Simona Radis; Ancuta Bodnar	Romania	2020 Tokyo	28 July 2021	
Quadruple sculls	6:05.13^{†}	Chen Yunxia; Zhang Ling; Lü Yang; Cui Xiaotong	China	2020 Tokyo	28 July 2021	
Coxless pair	6:47.41	Grace Prendergast; Kerri Gowler	New Zealand	2020 Tokyo	28 July 2021	
Coxless four	6:15.37	Lucy Stephan; Rosemary Popa; Jessica Morrison; Annabelle McIntyre	Australia	2020 Tokyo	28 July 2021	
Eight	5:52.99	Magdalena Rusu; Viviana Bejinariu; Georgiana Dedu; Maria Tivodariu; Ioana Vrinceanu; Amalia Beres; Madalina Beres; Denisa Tilvescu; Daniela Druncea (Coxswain)	Romania	2020 Tokyo	28 July 2021	
Lightweight double sculls	6:41.36	Federica Cesarini; Valentina Rodini	Italy	2020 Tokyo	28 July 2021	
