= Elizabeth Bradley (mathematician and rower) =

American mathematician and rower

- Born: April 9, 1961 (age 65)
- Education: Massachusetts Institute of Technology
- Scientific career
- Fields: nonlinear systems, time series
- Workplaces: University of Colorado Boulder

Elizabeth Bradley (born April 9, 1961) is an American applied mathematician and computer scientist, and a former Olympic rower. She is a professor of computer science at the University of Colorado Boulder, where she specializes in nonlinear systems and nonlinear time series analysis.

== Rowing ==
Bradley competed in the women's coxed four event at the 1988 Summer Olympics, with rowers Jennifer Corbet, Cynthia Eckert, and Sarah Gengler, and coxswain Kim Santiago. Their boat placed fifth out of the ten boats competing in the event.

She also competed in the 1986 World Rowing Championships, placing fourth in women's eights, and in the 1987 World Rowing Championships, placing fourth in women's pairs.

== Education and academic career ==
Bradley was a student at the Massachusetts Institute of Technology, where she earned a bachelor's degree in electrical engineering in 1983, a master's degree in computer science in 1986, and a Ph.D. in electrical engineering and computer science in 1992. Her dissertation, Taming Chaotic Circuits, was jointly supervised by Hal Abelson and Gerald Jay Sussman.

She joined the University of Colorado computer science department as an assistant professor in 1993, chaired the department from 2003 to 2006, and was promoted to full professor in 2004. She has also visited Harvard University, and was a Radcliffe fellow at the Radcliffe Institute for Advanced Study for 2006–2007 as well as a Packard Fellow in Science and Engineering in 1995.

She was named a CRA-W Distinguished Professor by the Committee on Widening Participation in Computing Research in 2008, and was named a President's Teaching Scholar by the University of Colorado in 2017.
