= Gengler =

Gengler is a German surname.

Notable people with the surname include:

- Heinrich Gottfried Philipp Gengler, German academic
- Josef Gengler (1863–1931), German physician and ornithologist
- Karl Gengler (1886–1974), German politician
- Marjory Gengler, American tennis player
- Sarah Gengler (born 1963), American Olympic rower
