= Ausra =

Ausra might refer to:

- Areva Solar, a formerly known as Ausra, an American power company
- Ausra Fridrikas (born 1967), Austrian handball player

Aušra is a Lithuanian word for "dawn" and may refer to:

- Aušra, a Lithuanian newspaper published in 1883–1886
- Aušra (disambiguation)
- Aušra (given name)
- Aušra (newspaper)
