= Rowing at the 1992 Summer Olympics – Women's coxless pair =

Women's coxless pair at the Games of the XXV Olympiad
- Date: 27 July – 1 August 1992
- Competitors: 26 from 13 nations

Medalists
1st place, gold medalist(s)		Kathleen Heddle; Marnie McBean	Canada
2nd place, silver medalist(s)		Ingeburg Schwerzmann; Stefani Werremeier	Germany
3rd place, bronze medalist(s)		Stephanie Pierson; Anna Seaton	United States

The women's coxless pair competition at the 1992 Summer Olympics took place at Lake of Banyoles, Spain.

== Competition format ==
The competition consisted of three main rounds (heats, semifinals, and finals) as well as a repechage. The 13 boats were divided into three heats for the first round, with 4 or 5 boats in each heat. The top three boats in each heat (9 boats total) advanced directly to the semifinals. The remaining 4 boats were placed in the repechage. The repechage featured a single heat. The top three boats in the repechage advanced to the semifinals. The slowest boat (4th place) in the repechage finished in 13th place.

The 12 semifinalist boats were divided into two heats of 6 boats each. The top three boats in each semifinal (6 boats total) advanced to the "A" final to compete for medals and 4th through 6th place; the bottom three boats in each semifinal were sent to the "B" final for 7th through 12th.

All races were over a 2000 metre course.

== Results ==
=== Heats ===
==== Heat 1 ====
Rank	Rowers	Nation	Time	Notes
1	Stephanie Maxwell-Pierson; Anna Seaton	United States	7:40.19	Q
2	Joanne Turvey; Miriam Batten	Great Britain	7:44.99	Q
3	Hanna Motrechko; Olena Ronzhyna-Morozova	Unified Team	7:53.89	Q
4	Violeta Zareva; Teodora Zareva	Bulgaria	8:03.55	R
5	Lee Jae-nam; Kim Sung-ok	South Korea	8:33.76	R

==== Heat 2 ====
Rank	Rowers	Nation	Time	Notes
1	Christine Gossé; Isabelle Danjou	France	7:43.29	Q
2	Liene Sastapa; Gunta Lamaša	Latvia	8:04.79	Q
3	Doina Liliana Snep-Bălan; Doina Ciucanu-Robu	Romania	8:10.03	Q
4	Margaret Gibson; Susanne Standish-White	Zimbabwe	8:24.16	R

==== Heat 3 ====
Rank	Rowers	Nation	Time	Notes
1	Kathleen Heddle; Marnie McBean	Canada	7:41.19	Q
2	Ingeburg Schwerzmann; Stefani Werremeier	Germany	7:43.60	Q
3	Nobuko Ota Miyuki Yamashita	Japan	7:55.16	Q
4	Violeta Lastakauskaitė; Violeta Bernotaitė	Lithuania	8:04.77	R

=== Repechage ===
Rank	Rowers	Nation	Time	Notes
1	Violeta Lastakauskaitė; Violeta Bernotaitė	Lithuania	7:52.47	Q
2	Violeta Zareva; Teodora Zareva	Bulgaria	7:58.18	Q
3	Margaret Gibson; Susanne Standish-White	Zimbabwe	8:07.93	Q
4	Lee Jae-nam; Kim Sung-ok	South Korea	8:15.42	

=== Semifinals ===
==== Semifinal 1 ====
Rank	Rowers	Nation	Time	Notes
1	Stephanie Maxwell-Pierson; Anna Seaton	United States	7:11.70	QA
2	Christine Gossé; Isabelle Danjou	France	7:12.35	QA
3	Ingeburg Schwerzmann; Stefani Werremeier	Germany	7:14.71	QA
4	Doina Liliana Snep-Bălan; Doina Ciucanu-Robu	Romania	7:24.94	QB
5	Hanna Motrechko; Olena Ronzhyna-Morozova	Unified Team	7:34.42	QB
6	Margaret Gibson; Susanne Standish-White	Zimbabwe	8:04.73	QB

==== Semifinal 2 ====
Rank	Rowers	Nation	Time	Notes
1	Kathleen Heddle; Marnie McBean	Canada	7:18.00	QA
2	Joanne Turvey; Miriam Batten	Great Britain	7:22.89	QA
3	Violeta Zareva; Teodora Zareva	Bulgaria	7:28.37	QA
4	Violeta Lastakauskaitė; Violeta Bernotaitė	Lithuania	7:30.54	QB
5	Liene Sastapa; Gunta Lamaša	Latvia	7:37.18	QB
6	Nobuko Ota Miyuki Yamashita	Japan	7:40.48	QB

=== Finals ===
==== Final B ====
Rank	Rowers	Nation	Time
7	Doina Liliana Snep-Bălan; Doina Ciucanu-Robu	Romania	7:22.07
8	Hanna Motrechko; Olena Ronzhyna-Morozova	Unified Team	7:25.15
9	Nobuko Ota Miyuki Yamashita	Japan	7:26.51
10	Violeta Lastakauskaitė; Violeta Bernotaitė	Lithuania	7:29.24
11	Liene Sastapa; Gunta Lamaša	Latvia	7:33.72
12	Margaret Gibson; Susanne Standish-White	Zimbabwe	7:56.10

==== Final A ====
Rank	Rowers	Nation	Time
1st place, gold medalist(s)	Kathleen Heddle; Marnie McBean	Canada	7:06.22
2nd place, silver medalist(s)	Ingeburg Schwerzmann; Stefani Werremeier	Germany	7:07.96
3rd place, bronze medalist(s)	Stephanie Maxwell-Pierson; Anna Seaton	United States	7:08.11
4	Christine Gossé; Isabelle Danjou	France	7:08.70
5	Joanne Turvey; Miriam Batten	Great Britain	7:17.28
6	Violeta Zareva; Teodora Zareva	Bulgaria	7:32.67

== Final classification ==
The following rowers took part:

Rank	Rowers	Country
1st place, gold medalist(s)	Kathleen Heddle; Marnie McBean	Canada
2nd place, silver medalist(s)	Ingeburg Schwerzmann; Stefani Werremeier	Germany
3rd place, bronze medalist(s)	Stephanie Pierson; Anna Seaton	United States
	Christine Gossé; Isabelle Danjou	France
	Joanne Turvey; Miriam Batten	Great Britain
	Violeta Zareva; Teodora Zareva	Bulgaria
	Doina Liliana Snep-Bălan; Doina Ciucanu-Robu	Romania
	Hanna Motrechko; Olena Ronzhyna-Morozova	Unified Team
	Nobuko Ota; Miyuki Yamashita	Japan
	Violeta Lastakauskaitė; Violeta Bernotaitė	Lithuania
	Liene Sastapa; Gunta Lamaša	Latvia
	Margaret Gibson; Susanne Standish-White	Zimbabwe
	Lee Jae-nam; Kim Sung-ok	South Korea
