= Meinhard E. Mayer =

Romanian–born American mathematician

Meinhard Edwin Mayer (March 18, 1929 – December 11, 2011) was a Romanian–born American Professor Emeritus of Physics and Mathematics at the University of California, Irvine, which he joined in 1966.

== Biography ==
He was born on March 18, 1929, in Cernăuți. He experienced both the Soviet occupation of Northern Bukovina and, as a Jew, deportation to the Transnistria Governorate. He received his Ph.D. from the University of Bucharest in 1957, where he taught until 1961.

He then taught at Brandeis University and Indiana University before moving to the University of California, Irvine (UCI) in 1966, where he taught until his retirement. He also took sabbaticals to various institutes, including the Institut des Hautes Etudes Scientifiques and MIT.

He had a deep interest in music, and in Yiddish language and literature.

He died in Newport Beach, California, on December 11, 2011. He was survived by his wife Ruth, his children Elma Mayer and Niels Mayer, and his grandchildren Jonathan Mayer, Juniper Woodbury, and Moss Woodbury.

== Research ==
His research interests ranged from geometric methods in gauge theory, to the application of wavelets in turbulence. He was an early contributor (1958) to the theory of vector-bosons (W and Z bosons) and electro-weak unification, which later became the Standard Model, and an early advocate of the use of fiber bundles in gauge theory.

He was a co-author (with Gerald Jay Sussman and Jack Wisdom) of Structure and Interpretation of Classical Mechanics, MIT Press, Cambridge, MA, 2001 ISBN 0-262-19455-4
