= Latvia at the 1992 Summer Olympics =

- IOC code: LAT
- NOC: Latvian Olympic Committee

in Barcelona
- Competitors: 34 (25 men and 9 women) in 13 sports
- Flag bearer: Raimonds Bergmanis
- Medals Ranked 40th: Gold 0 Silver 2 Bronze 1 Total 3

Summer Olympics appearances (overview)
- 1924; 1928; 1932; 1936; 1948–1988; 1992; 1996; 2000; 2004; 2008; 2012; 2016; 2020; 2024

Other related appearances
- Russian Empire (1908–1912); Soviet Union (1952–1988)

Latvia competed at the 1992 Summer Olympics in Barcelona, Spain. It was the first time since 1936 that the nation had competed as an independent country at the Summer Olympic Games. Latvian athletes competed for the Soviet Union (USSR) from 1952 to 1988. 34 competitors, 25 men and 9 women, took part in 31 events in 13 sports.

== Medalists ==
Medal	Name	Sport	Event	Date
Silver	Afanasijs Kuzmins	Shooting	Men's 25 metre rapid fire pistol	30 July
Silver	Ivans Klementjevs	Canoeing	Men's C-1 1000 metres	8 August
Bronze	Dainis Ozols	Cycling	Men's individual road race	2 August

== Competitors ==
The following is the list of number of competitors in the Games.

Sport	Men	Women	Total
Athletics	4	3	7
Boxing	1	–	1
Canoeing	2	1	3
Cycling	5	0	5
Judo	2	0	2
Modern pentathlon	3	–	3
Rowing	1	2	3
Sailing	1	1	2
Shooting	2	0	2
Swimming	1	0	1
Tennis	0	2	2
Weightlifting	2	–	2
Wrestling	1	–	1
Total	25	9	34

== Athletics ==
Men
Track & road events

Athlete	Event	Heat		Quarterfinal		Semifinal		Final	
Athlete	Event	Result	Rank	Result	Rank	Result	Rank	Result	Rank
Igors Kazanovs	110 m hurdles	13.88	4 Q	13.76	4 Q	13.77	6	did not advance	

Field events

Athlete	Event	Qualification		Final	
Athlete	Event	Distance	Position	Distance	Position
Māris Bružiks	Triple jump	16.94	9 Q	16.80	10
Aleksandrs Obižājevs	Pole vault	NM		did not advance	
Mārcis Štrobinders	Javelin throw	76.32	19	did not advance	

Women
Track & road events

Athlete	Event	Heat		Quarterfinal		Semifinal		Final	
Athlete	Event	Result	Rank	Result	Rank	Result	Rank	Result	Rank
Anita Klapote	10000 m	—N/a						DNF	

Field events

Athlete	Event	Qualification		Final	
Athlete	Event	Distance	Position	Distance	Position
Ilga Bērtulsone	Discus throw	58.92	19	did not advance	
Valentīna Gotovska	High jump	1.92	6 Q	1.83	13

== Boxing ==
Men

Athlete	Event	1 Round	2 Round	3 Round	Quarterfinals	Semifinals	Final
Athlete	Event	Opposition Result	Opposition Result	Opposition Result	Opposition Result	Opposition Result	Rank
Igors Šaplavskis	Light Middleweight	BYE	Joseph Marwa (TAN); W 14-8	—N/a	Juan Carlos Lemus (CUB); L 2-12	Did not advance	5

== Canoeing ==
=== Slalom ===
Athlete	Event	Preliminary				Final	
Athlete	Event	Run 1	Rank	Run 2	Rank	Best	Rank
Dzintra Blūma	Women's K-1	173.37	23	160.83	20	160.83	24

=== Sprint ===
Men

Athlete	Event	Heats		Repechages		Semifinals		Final	
Athlete	Event	Time	Rank	Time	Rank	Time	Rank	Time	Rank
Jefimijs Klementjevs	C-1 500 m	1:56.53	3 Q	BYE		1:56.96	6	did not advance	
Ivans Klementyev	C-1 1000 m	4:03.82	3 Q	BYE		4:04.12	3 Q	4:06.60	Silver medal

== Cycling ==
Five cyclists, all men, represented Latvia in 1992. Dainis Ozols won bronze in the road race.

=== Road ===
Athlete	Event	Time	Rank
Dainis Ozols	Men's road race	4:35:24	Bronze medal
Arvis Piziks	Men's road race	4:35:56	8
Arnolds Ūdris	Men's road race	4:35:56	53

=== Track ===
Time trial

Athlete	Event	Time	Rank
Ingus Veips	Men's time trial	1:06.074	11

Sprint

Athlete	Event	Qualification		2nd round	Repechage	Repechage finals	3rd round	Repechage	Quarterfinals	Classification 5-8	Semifinals	Final
Athlete	Event	Time	Rank	Opposition Time	Opposition Time	Opposition Time	Opposition Time	Opposition Time	Opposition Time	Opposition Time	Opposition Time	Rank
Ainārs Ķiksis	Men's sprint	10.749	8 Q	Erik Schoefs (BEL); L 11.505	Sean Bloch (RSA); W 11.327	Roberto Chiappa (ITA); Keiji Kojima (JPN); L 11.264	Gary Neiwand (AUS); Frédéric Magné (FRA); L 11.112	José Lovito (ARG); L 11.266	did not advance			

Points race

Athlete	Event	Qualification			Final		
Athlete	Event	Points	Laps	Rank	Points	Laps	Rank
Arnolds Ūdris	Men's points race	10	1	28	did not advance		

== Judo ==
Men

Athlete	Event	Preliminary	Round of 32	Round of 16	Quarterfinals	Semifinals	Repechage 1	Repechage 2	Repechage 3	Repechage Final	Final / BM	
Athlete	Event	Opposition Result	Opposition Result	Opposition Result	Opposition Result	Opposition Result	Opposition Result	Opposition Result	Opposition Result	Opposition Result	Opposition Result	Rank
Vsevolods Zeonijs	−65 kg	BYE	Sang-Mun Kim (KOR); L 0000–1000	did not advance								
Vadims Voinovs	−95 kg	BYE	Dmitri Sergeyev (EUN); L 0000–0010	did not advance								

== Modern pentathlon ==
Three male pentathletes represented Latvia in 1992.

Athlete	Event	Shooting (10 m air pistol)	Fencing (épée one touch)	Swimming (200 m freestyle)	Riding (show jumping)	Running (3000 m)	Total points	Final rank
Athlete	Event	Points	Points	Points	Points	Points	Total points	Final rank
Stanislavs Dobrotovskis	Men's	762	1176	1075	931	852	4796	52
Vjačeslavs Duhanovs	Men's	796	1184	940	883	DSQ	3803	64
Kirils Medjancevs	Men's	949	1276	955	934	1040	5154	26
Stanislavs Dobrotovskis; Vjačeslavs Duhanovs; Kirils Medjancevs	Team	2507	3636	2970	2748	1892	13753	17

== Rowing ==
Men

Athlete	Event	Heats		Repechage		Semifinals C-D		Semifinals		Final	
Athlete	Event	Time	Rank	Time	Rank	Time	Rank	Time	Rank	Time	Rank
Uģis Lasmanis	Single sculls	7:14.61	5 R	7:03.27	2 Q	—N/a		7:10.69	10 FB	7:01.54	9

Women

Athlete	Event	Heats		Repechage		Semifinals C-D		Semifinals		Final	
Athlete	Event	Time	Rank	Time	Rank	Time	Rank	Time	Rank	Time	Rank
Liene Sastapa; Gunta Lamasa	Coxless pair	8:04.79	2 Q	—N/a				7:37.18	5 FB	7:33.72	11

== Sailing ==
Men

Athlete	Event	Race										Net points	Final rank
Athlete	Event	1	2	3	4	5	6	7	8	9	10	Net points	Final rank
Ansis Dāle	Lechner A-390	24	23	~~RET~~	27	35	13	26	32	21	32	287.0	29

Women

Athlete	Event	Race										Net points	Final rank
Athlete	Event	1	2	3	4	5	6	7	8	9	10	Net points	Final rank
Ilona Dzelme	Lechner A-390	21	~~22~~	19	20	17	22	19	20	19	12	223.0	21

== Shooting ==
Men

Athlete	Event	Qualification		Semifinal		Final	
Athlete	Event	Score	Rank	Score	Rank	Score	Rank
Afanasijs Kuzmins	25 m rapid fire pistol	590	5 Q	785	3	882	Silver medal

Open

Athlete	Event	Qualification		Semifinal		Final	
Athlete	Event	Score	Rank	Score	Rank	Score	Rank
Boriss Timofejevs	Skeet	148	10 Q	197	11	did not advance	

== Swimming ==
Men

Athlete	Event	Heat		Final B		Final	
Athlete	Event	Time	Rank	Time	Rank	Time	Rank
Artūrs Jakovļevs	100 m butterfly	55.95	33	did not advance			

== Tennis ==
Women

Athlete	Event	Round of 64	Round of 32	Round of 16	Quarterfinals	Semifinals	Final / BM	
Athlete	Event	Opposition Score	Opposition Score	Opposition Score	Opposition Score	Opposition Score	Opposition Score	Rank
Agnese Blumberga	Singles	Christina Papadáki (GRE); W 4–6, 6–1, 6–2	Amanda Coetzer (RSA); L 2–6, 4–6	did not advance				
Larisa Savchenko	Singles	Katerina Maleeva (BUL); L 6–7, 2–6	did not advance					
Agnese Blumberga; Larisa Savchenko	Doubles	—N/a	Petra Ritter; Judith Wiesner (AUT); L 4–6, 7–5, 3–6	did not advance				

== Weightlifting ==
Men

Athlete	Event	Snatch		Clean & Jerk		Total	Rank
Athlete	Event	Result	Rank	Result	Rank	Total	Rank
Aleksandrs Žerebkovs	75 kg	150.0	10	175.0	21	325.0	14
Raimonds Bergmanis	110 kg	162.5	15	200.0	13	362.5	14

== Wrestling ==
Men's freestyle

Athlete	Event	Elimination Pool							Final round	
Athlete	Event	Round 1 Result	Round 2 Result	Round 3 Result	Round 4 Result	Round 5 Result	Round 6 Result	Rank	Final round Result	Rank
Eduards Žukovs	−62 kg	Musa Ilhan (AUS); W 2-5 T	Dariusz Grzywiński (POL); L 2-4	Askari Mohammadian (IRN); L 0-11	Anibál Nieves (PUR); L 1-6	—N/a		6	did not advance	
