= Mi-jung =

- Hangul: 미정
- RR: Mijeong
- MR: Mijŏng

Mi-jung, also spelled Mi-jeong, is a Korean given name.

People with this name include:

- Mi-Jung Lee (born 1966), South Korean-born Canadian television news anchor
- Park Mi-jeong (born 1968), South Korean rower
- Kim Mi-jung (judoka, born 1971), South Korean judoka who competed at the 1992 Summer Olympics
- Kim Mi-jung (fencer) (born 1977), South Korean fencer
- Kim Mi-jung (sport shooter) (born 1977), South Korean sport shooter
- Jin Mi-jung (born 1978), South Korean basketball player
- Kim Mi-jung (judoka, born 1978), South Korean judoka who competed at the 2004 Summer Olympics
- Kim Mi-jung (racewalker) (born 1979), South Korean race walker
- Seo Mi-jung (born 1980), South Korean foil fencer
- Nam Gyu-ri (born Nam Mi-jeong, 1985), South Korean actress
- M. J. Hur (Korean name Hur Mi-jung, born 1989), South Korean golfer

== See also ==
- List of Korean given names
