= Elwira Lorenz =

Polish rower

Personal information
- Nationality: Polish
- Born: 29 July 1962 (age 62); Wielkopolskie, Poland

Sport
- Sport: Rowing

Elwira Lorenz (born 29 July 1962) is a Polish rower. She competed in the women's coxed four event at the 1988 Summer Olympics.

In the 1987 World Rowing Championships in Copenhagen, Denmark, with Zyta Jarka, she placed 4th in the Fb final. In the 1989 world championships in Bled, Slovenia, with Czeslawa Szczepinska, she placed 2nd in the Fb final.
