= Heather Clark =

Heather Clark may refer to:

- Heather Clark (surfer), South African surfer
- Heather Clark (journalist), American journalist
- Heather Clark (writer), American writer, literary critic and academic
- Heather Jo Clark (born 1980), American mixed martial artist

== See also ==
- Heather Clarke (born 1958), Canadian rower
