= Stability of the Solar System =

Long term dynamical interactions that disrupt the Solar System

The stability of the Solar System is a subject of much inquiry in astronomy. Though the planets have historically been stable as observed, and will be in the "short" term, their weak gravitational effects on one another can add up in ways that are not predictable by any simple means.

For this reason (among others), the Solar System is chaotic in the technical sense defined by mathematical chaos theory, and that chaotic behavior degrades even the most precise long-term numerical or analytic models for the orbital motion in the Solar System, so they cannot be valid beyond more than a few tens of millions of years into the past or future – about 1% its present age.

The Solar System is stable on the time-scale of the existence of humans, and far beyond, given that it is unlikely any of the planets will collide with each other or be ejected from the system in the next few billion years, and that Earth's orbit will be relatively stable.

Since Newton's law of gravitation (1687), mathematicians and astronomers (such as Pierre-Simon Laplace, Joseph-Louis Lagrange, Carl Friedrich Gauss, Henri Poincaré, Andrey Kolmogorov, Vladimir Arnold, and Jürgen Moser) have searched for evidence for the stability of the planetary motions, and this quest has led to many mathematical developments and several successive "proofs" of stability of the Solar System.

== Overview and challenges ==
The orbits of the planets are open to long-term variations. Modeling the Solar System is a case of the n-body problem of physics, which is generally unsolvable except by numerical simulation. Because of the chaotic behavior embedded in the mathematics, long-term predictions can only be statistical, rather than certain.

=== Resonance ===
Graph showing the numbers of Kuiper belt objects for a given distance (in AU; i.e., the distance from the Sun to Earth) from the Sun

An orbital resonance happens when the periods of any two objects have a simple numerical ratio. The most fundamental period for an object in the Solar System is its orbital period, and orbital resonances pervade the Solar System. In 1867, the American astronomer Daniel Kirkwood noticed that asteroids in the main belt are not randomly distributed. There were distinct gaps in the belt at locations that corresponded to resonances with Jupiter. For example, there were no asteroids at the 3:1 resonance — a distance of 2.5 AU (370 million km; 230 million mi) — or at the 2:1 resonance, at 3.3 AU (490 million km; 310 million mi). These are now known as the Kirkwood gaps. Some asteroids were later discovered to orbit in these gaps, but when closely analyzed their orbits were determined to be unstable and they will eventually break out of the resonance due to close encounters with a major planet.

Another common form of resonance in the Solar System is spin–orbit resonance, where the rotation period (the time it takes the planet or moon to rotate once about its axis) has a simple numerical relationship with its orbital period. An example is the Moon, which is in a 1:1 spin–orbit resonance that keeps its far side away from Earth. (This feature is also known as tidal locking.) Another example is Mercury, which is in a 3:2 spin–orbit resonance with the Sun.

=== Predictability ===
The planets' orbits are chaotic over longer time scales, in such a way that the whole Solar System possesses a Lyapunov time in the range of 2~230 million years. In all cases, this means that the positions of individual planets along their orbits ultimately become impossible to predict with any certainty. In some cases, the orbits themselves may change dramatically. Such chaos manifests most strongly as changes in eccentricity, with some planets' orbits becoming significantly more – or less – elliptical. (Note: The effect of orbital eccentricity oscillation on the shape of the orbit is analogous to the shape change of the rim of a ringing bell, neglecting the side-to-side displacement of the orbit's geometric center. The analogy fails to represent the entire orbital change, because while the gravitational center of the orbit remains nearly fixed on the Sun, its geometric center swings from side to side at the same rate as the eccentricity oscillation; a ringing bell's geometric center remains fixed, or can only swing several orders of magnitude more slowly than its edge vibrates.)

In calculation, the unknowns include asteroids, the solar quadrupole moment, mass loss from the Sun through radiation and the solar wind, drag of the solar wind on planetary magnetospheres, galactic tidal forces, and effects from passing stars.

== Scenarios ==
=== Neptune–Pluto resonance ===
The Neptune–Pluto system lies in a 3:2 orbital resonance. C.J. Cohen and E.C. Hubbard at the Naval Surface Warfare Center Dahlgren Division discovered this in 1965. Although the resonance itself will remain stable in the short term, it becomes impossible to predict the position of Pluto with any degree of accuracy, as the uncertainty in the position grows by a factor e with each Lyapunov time, which for Pluto is 10–20 million years. Thus, on a time scale of hundreds of millions of years Pluto's orbital phase becomes impossible to determine, even if Pluto's orbit appears to be perfectly stable on 10 myr time scales.

=== Mercury–Jupiter 1:1 perihelion-precession resonance ===
The planet Mercury is especially susceptible to Jupiter's influence because of a small celestial coincidence: Mercury's perihelion, the point where it gets closest to the Sun, precesses at a rate of about 1.5 degrees every 1,000 years, and Jupiter's perihelion precesses only a little slower. At one point, the two may fall into sync, at which time Jupiter's constant gravitational tugs could accumulate and pull Mercury off course, with 1–2% probability, 3–4 billion years into the future. This could eject it from the Solar System altogether or send it on a collision course with Venus, the Sun, or Earth.

Mercury's perihelion-precession rate is dominated by planet–planet interactions, but about 7.5% of Mercury's perihelion precession rate comes from the effects described by general relativity. The work by Laskar and Gastineau (described below) showed the importance of general relativity (G.R.) in long-term Solar System stability. Specifically, without G.R. the instability rate of Mercury would be 60 times higher than with G.R. By modelling the instability time of Mercury as a one-dimensional Fokker–Planck diffusion process, the relationship between the instability time of Mercury and the Mercury–Jupiter 1:1 perihelion-precession resonance can be investigated statistically. This diffusion model shows that G.R. not only distances Mercury and Jupiter from falling into a 1:1 resonance, but also decreases the rate at which Mercury diffuses through phase space. Thus, not only does G.R. decrease the likelihood of Mercury's instability, but also extends the time at which it is likely to occur.

=== Galilean moon resonance ===
Jupiter's Galilean moons experience strong tidal dissipation and mutual interactions due to their size and proximity to Jupiter. Currently, Io, Europa, and Ganymede are in a 4:2:1 Laplace resonance with each other, with each inner moon completing two orbits for every orbit of the next moon out. In around 1.5 billion years, outward migration of these moons will trap the fourth and outermost moon, Callisto, into another 2:1 resonance with Ganymede. This 8:4:2:1 resonance will cause Callisto to migrate outward, and it may remain stable with approximately 56% probability, or become disrupted with Io usually exiting the chain.

=== Chaos from geological processes ===
Another example is Earth's axial tilt, which, due to friction raised within Earth's mantle by tidal interactions with the Moon, will be rendered chaotic between 1.5 and 4.5 billion years from now. (Note: The dynamical modelling of the Solar System beyond approximately 4 billion years into the future is greatly complicated by the transition of the Sun into its old-age giant phase: The Sun will lose mass at an uncertain rate, heat up, and greatly expand, all of which will change the dynamics of planetary orbits. Solar mass-loss will slow all planetary orbits, uniformly slowing the time scale of change in the Solar System. The mass-loss will also reduce Solar perturbations on planets and in relative terms increase perturbations by planets on the Sun and on each other. The gas ejected by the aged Sun may slightly perturb planetary orbits, either by drag (unlikely) or adding to planetary masses (only slightly more likely). Heating up and expansion of the Sun will severely affect some of the inner planets: It will at least ablate their atmospheres and possibly some of their surfaces (reducing their mass and hence diminishing their perturbations on other planets and the Sun). The only planet certain to be drastically affected is Mercury, which will be enclosed inside the Sun, and presumably slowly dissolved (hence smearing out and removing its perturbations entirely), if it has not previously been ejected from its close Solar orbit.)

=== External influences ===
Objects coming from outside the Solar System can also affect it. Though they are not technically part of the Solar System for the purposes of studying the system's intrinsic stability, they nevertheless can change it. Unfortunately, predicting the potential influences of these extrasolar objects is even more difficult than predicting the influences of objects within the system simply because of the sheer distances involved. Among the known objects with a potential to significantly affect the Solar System is the star Gliese 710, which is expected to pass near the system in approximately 1.281 million years. Though the star is not expected to substantially affect the orbits of the major planets, it could substantially disrupt the Oort cloud, potentially causing major comet activity throughout the Solar System. There are at least a dozen other stars that have a potential to make a close approach in the next few million years. In 2022, Garett Brown and Hanno Rein of the University of Toronto published a study exploring the long-term stability of the Solar System in the presence of weak perturbations from stellar flybys. They determined that if a passing star altered the semi-major axis of Neptune by at least 0.03 AU (4.49 million km; 2.79 million miles) it would increase the chance of instability by 10 times over the subsequent 5 billion years. They also estimated that a flyby of this magnitude is not likely to occur for 100 billion years.

== Recent studies ==
=== LonGStOP, 1982 ===
Project LonGStOP (LOng-term Gravitational Study of the Outer Planets) was a 1982 international consortium of Solar System dynamicists led by A.E. Roy. It involved creation of a model on a supercomputer, integrating the orbits of (only) the outer planets. Its results revealed several curious exchanges of energy between the outer planets, but no signs of gross instability.

=== Digital Orrery, 1988 ===
Another project involved constructing the Digital Orrery by G. Sussman and his MIT group in 1988. The group used a special-purpose computer whose multiprocessor architecture was optimized for integrating the orbits of the outer planets. It was used to integrate out to 845 million years – some 20% of the age of the Solar System. In 1988, Sussman and Wisdom found data using the Orrery that revealed that Pluto's orbit shows signs of chaos, due in part to its peculiar resonance with Neptune.

If Pluto's orbit is chaotic, then technically the whole Solar System is chaotic. This might be more than a technicality, since even a Solar System body as small as Pluto might affect the others to a perceptible extent through cumulative gravitational perturbations.

=== Laskar, 1989 ===
In 1989, Jacques Laskar of the Bureau des Longitudes in Paris published the results of his numerical integration of the Solar System over 200 million years. These were not the full equations of motion, but rather averaged equations along the lines of those used by Laplace. Laskar's work showed that the Earth's orbit is chaotic (as are the orbits of all the inner planets) and that an error as small as 15 metres in measuring the position of the Earth today would make it impossible to predict where the Earth would be in its orbit in just over 100 million years' time.

=== Batygin and Laughlin, 2008 ===
Independently of Laskar and Gastineau, Batygin and Laughlin were also directly simulating the Solar System 20 billion years into the future. Their results reached the same basic conclusions as did Laskar and Gastineau, while additionall providing a lower bound of a billion years on the dynamical lifespan of the Solar System.

=== Laskar and Gastineau, 2009 ===
Jacques Laskar and his colleague Mickaël Gastineau in 2008 took a more thorough approach by directly simulating 2,501 possible futures. Each of the 2,501 cases has slightly different initial conditions: Mercury's position varies by about 1 metre (3.3 feet) between one simulation and the next. In 20 cases, Mercury goes into a dangerous orbit and often ends up colliding with Venus or plunging into the Sun. Moving in such a warped orbit, Mercury's gravity is more likely to shake other planets out of their settled paths: In one simulated case, Mercury's perturbations sent Mars heading toward Earth.

=== Brown and Rein, 2020 ===
In 2020, Garett Brown and Hanno Rein of the University of Toronto published the results of their numerical integration of the Solar System over 5 billion years. Their work showed that Mercury's orbit is highly chaotic and that an error as small as 0.38 millimeters (0.015 inches) in measuring the position of Mercury today would make it impossible to predict the eccentricity of its orbit in just over 200 million years' time.

=== Batygin et. al., 2026 ===
In 2026, a team led by Batygin analyzed the orbital dynamics of the outer solar system under different solar mass-loss conditions. The results reaffirmed the lower bound from Batygin's 2008 study, estimating the solar system's life expectancy at one billion years after the Sun becomes a white dwarf.

== See also ==
- Clearing the neighbourhood
- Future of Earth
- Global catastrophic risk
- Resonant trans-Neptunian object
