= Kim Mi-jung =

Kim Mi-jung may refer to:

- Kim Mi-jung (judoka, born 1971), South Korean judoka
- Kim Mi-jung (judoka, born 1978), South Korean judoka
- Kim Mi-jung (fencer) (born 1977), South Korean fencer
- Kim Mi-jung (footballer) (born 1978)
- Kim Mi-jung (racewalker) (born 1979), South Korean race walker
- Kim Mi-jung (sport shooter) (born 1977), South Korean sport shooter
