= David McAllester =

David McAllester may refer to:

- David A. McAllester (born 1956), computer scientist and artificial intelligence researcher
- David P. McAllester (1916–2006), ethnomusicologist
- David S. McAllester (born 1983), founder of BIGPLAY and host of the BIGPLAY Reflog Show

== See also ==
- David McAllister (disambiguation)
