= Gim Seong-ok =

Gim Seong-ok (Korean: 김성옥) may refer to:

- Kim Seong-ok (born 1967), South Korean para table tennis player
- Kim Sung-ok (born 1970), South Korean rower
- Kim Song-ok (politician), a North Korean member of the 5th Supreme People's Assembly
