= Stefani Werremeier =

German rower

Medal record

Women's rowing

Representing West Germany

World Rowing Championships
Gold medal – first place	1990 Tasmania	W2-

Representing Germany

Olympic Games
Silver medal – second place	1992 Barcelona	Coxless pair

World Rowing Championships
Gold medal – first place	1990 Tasmania	W2-
Gold medal – first place	1994 Indianapolis	W8+
Silver medal – second place	1991 Vienna	W2-
Bronze medal – third place	1993 Racice	W8+

Stefani Werremeier (born 17 October 1968 in Osnabrück) is a German rower. She won a gold medal in coxless pairs at the 1990 World Rowing Championships and a silver in the same event at the 1991 World Rowing Championships. At the 1992 Summer Olympics she and Ingeburg Schwerzmann won silver medals in the coxless pair event. In the same event at the 1996 Summer Olympics she and Kathrin Haacker came in 4th. Werremeier also won a gold medal at the 1994 World Rowing Championships as part of the German coxed eights team.
