= Aušra (disambiguation) =

Aušra is the Lithuanian word for "dawn", and may refer to:

- Aušra, a Lithuanian newspaper published in 1883–1886
- Aušra (newspaper), other Lithuanian-language periodicals
- Aušra, Lithuanian pagan goddess of dawn (see List of Lithuanian gods)

Settlements

- Aušra, Anykščiai, village in Anykščiai District Municipality, Lithuania
- Aušra, Kėdainiai, village in Kėdainiai District Municipality, Lithuania
- Aušra, Molėtai, village in Molėtai District Municipality, Lithuania

See also

- Aušra (given name)
