= Nevyana Ivanova =

Bulgarian rower

Personal information
- Nationality: Bulgarian
- Born: 18 May 1962 (age 62)

Sport
- Sport: Rowing

Nevyana Ivanova (Bulgarian: Невяна Иванова; born 18 May 1962) is a Bulgarian rower. She competed in the women's eight event at the 1988 Summer Olympics.
