= Miglena Mikhaleva =

Bulgarian rower

Personal information
- Full name: Miglena Angelova Mikhaleva
- Nationality: Bulgarian
- Born: 1 August 1968 (age 56); Ruse, Bulgaria

Sport
- Sport: Rowing

Miglena Angelova Mikhaleva (Bulgarian: Миглена Ангелова Михалева; born 1 August 1968) is a Bulgarian rower. She competed in the women's coxed four event at the 1988 Summer Olympics.
