= Nadezhda Sugako =

Soviet rower

Personal information
- Nationality: Soviet
- Born: 9 February 1964 (age 61)

Sport
- Sport: Rowing

Nadezhda Sugako (born 9 February 1964) is a Soviet rower. She competed in the women's eight event at the 1988 Summer Olympics.
