= Veronica Necula =

Romanian rower

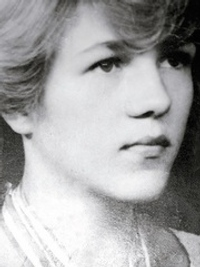

Personal information
- Born: 15 May 1967 (age 59) Târgoviște, SR Romania
- Height: 182 cm (6 ft 0 in)
- Weight: 80 kg (176 lb)

Sport
- Sport: Rowing
- Club: CSA Steaua Bucuresti
Medal record
Representing Romania
Olympic Games
| Silver medal – second place | 1988 Seoul | Eight |
| Silver medal – second place | 1992 Barcelona | Eight |
| Bronze medal – third place | 1988 Seoul | Coxed four |
World Rowing Championships
| Gold medal – first place | 1987 Copenhagen | Eight |
| Gold medal – first place | 1987 Copenhagen | Coxed four |
| Bronze medal – third place | 1986 Nottingham | Eight |
Summer Universiade
| Gold medal – first place | 1993 Buffalo | Quadruple sculls |
| Silver medal – second place | 1993 Buffalo | Coxless fours |

Veronica Necula (born 15 May 1967) is a retired Romanian rower. Competing both in coxed fours and eights she won two medals at the 1988 Olympics and two world titles in 1987. After retiring from competitions she worked as a rowing coach at her native club CSA Steaua Bucuresti.
