= Juliet Thompson (rower) =

American rower

Personal information
- Born: December 20, 1967 (age 57); Louisville, Kentucky, United States

Sport
- Sport: Rowing

Juliet Thompson Hochman (born December 20, 1967) is an American rower triathlete and coach. She competed in the women's eight event at the 1988 Summer Olympics. She graduated from Harvard University and Stanford University. She also started numerous non-profit organisations and has worked as a community volunteer and a project manager.

== Biography ==
Thompson was born in Louisville, Kentucky, in 1967, and grew up in New England. While in high school, Thompson played field hockey, basketball and took up rowing. She competed at the World Rowing Junior Championships in 1984 in the eights, and the fours event at the 1987 World Rowing Championships. Thompson earned her B.S. in Chinese Studies at Harvard University in 1989, and her MBA at Stanford University in 1995. After her marriage, she became known as Juliet Hochman or Juliet Thompson Hochman.

Thompson watched the US rowing team at the 1984 Summer Olympics on television, which inspired her to aim for Olympic selection herself. At the 1988 Summer Olympics in Seoul, Thompson was the youngest member of the US rowing team that competed in the women's eight event, where they finished in sixth place. She was inducted into the Harvard Hall of Fame in 1993.

Following her rowing career, Thompson started and ran numerous nonprofit programs around the world. She founded SCORE in South Africa to provide opportunities for black township children to participate in sport at the end of the apartheid era. Thompson worked for WorldTeach in Namibia and piloted a program for Mercy Corps supporting refugees on the China–North Korea border. She worked for Friends of the Children in Oregon and founded their new chapter in Boston. After taking time off to raise her two sons and support her husband's career in Oregon, Massachusetts and The Netherlands, Thompson worked as a Project Manager for several different companies in Portland, Oregon.

In 2017, Thompson turned her hand to triathlon racing and coaching and currently works for LifeSport Coaching in Canada, led by Lance Watson. Embracing triathlon as a second athletic career, Thompson is a World Champion at the half-ironman (70.3) distance as well as the sprint triathlon and sprint duathlon events. She is a multiple national champion and All American at a variety of distances.
