= Margaret Gibson (rower) =

Zimbabwean rower (born 1961)

Personal information
- Nationality: Zimbabwean
- Born: 4 January 1961 (age 64)

Sport
- Sport: Rowing

Margaret Ruth Gibson (born 4 January 1961) is a Zimbabwean former rower. She competed in the women's coxless pair event at the 1992 Summer Olympics.
