= Herta Anitaș =

Romanian rower

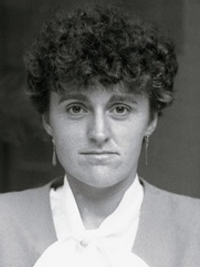

Personal information
- Born: 18 August 1967 (age 58)
- Height: 183 cm (6 ft 0 in)
- Weight: 82 kg (181 lb)

Sport
- Sport: Rowing
Medal record
Representing Romania
Olympic Games
Silver medal – second place	1988 Seoul	Eight
Bronze medal – third place	1988 Seoul	Coxed four
World Championships
Bronze medal – third place	1986 Nottingham	Eight

Herta Anitaș (born 18 August 1962) is a retired Romanian rower who won a silver and a bronze medal at the 1988 Olympics.
