= Violeta Bernotaitė =

Lithuanian rower (born 1965)

Personal information
- Nationality: Lithuanian
- Born: 4 April 1965 (age 60) Viekšniai, Lithuanian SSR, Soviet Union

Sport
- Sport: Rowing

Violeta Bernotaitė (born 4 April 1965) is a Lithuanian rower. She competed in the women's coxless pair event at the 1992 Summer Olympics.
