= Zhou Shouying =

Chinese rower

Personal information
- Born: 11 September 1969 (age 56) Hubei Province, China

Sport
- Sport: Rowing
Medal record
Representing China
Olympic Games
Silver medal – second place	1988 Seoul	Coxed four
Bronze medal – third place	1988 Seoul	Eight
World Rowing Championships
Silver medal – second place	1989 Bled	Coxless four
Asian Games
Gold medal – first place	1990 Beijing	Coxless pair
Summer Universiade
Bronze medal – third place	1989 Duisburg	Coxless four

Zhou Shouying (Chinese: 周守英; born 11 September 1969) is a female Chinese rower. She competed at 1988 Seoul Olympic Games. Together with her teammates, she won a silver medal in the women's coxed four and a bronze medal in the women's eight. She competed in the women's coxless four and the women's eight at the 1992 Summer Olympics and placed fourth and fifth, respectively.
