= Zhang Xianghua =

Chinese rower

Olympic medal record

Women's rowing

Representing China
Silver medal – second place	1988 Seoul	Coxed four
Bronze medal – third place	1988 Seoul	Eight

Zhang Xianghua (Chinese: 张香花, born 10 May 1968) is a female Chinese rower. She competed at 1988 Seoul Olympic Games. Together with her teammates, she won a silver medal in women's coxed four, and a bronze medal in women's eight.
