= Grażyna Błąd =

Polish coxswain

Personal information
- Nationality: Polish
- Born: 1 March 1969 (age 56); Złotów, Poland

Sport
- Sport: Rowing

Grażyna Błąd (born 1 March 1969) is a Polish rowing coxswain. She competed in the women's coxed four event at the 1988 Summer Olympics.
