= Beatrix Schröer =

German rower (born 1963)

Personal information
- Nationality: German
- Born: 4 April 1963 (age 63) Meissen, East Germany

Sport
- Sport: rower

Beatrix Schröer
Medal record

Women's rowing

Representing East Germany

Olympic Games
Gold medal – first place	1988 Seoul	Eight

Beatrix Schröer (born 4 May 1963 in Meissen) is a German rower.
