= Isabelle Danjou =

French rower (born 1969)

Personal information
- Nationality: French
- Born: 14 September 1969 (age 55); Bergerac, France

Sport
- Sport: Rowing

Isabelle Danjou (born 14 September 1969) is a French rower. She competed in the women's coxless pair event at the 1992 Summer Olympics.
