= Irina Teterina =

Soviet rower

Personal information
- Nationality: Soviet
- Born: 7 January 1958 (age 67)

Sport
- Sport: Rowing

Irina Teterina (born 7 January 1958) is a Soviet rower. She competed in the women's coxed four event at the 1988 Summer Olympics.
