= Elżbieta Jankowska (rower) =

Polish rower

Personal information
- Born: 2 October 1964 (age 61) Kożuchów, Poland
- Education: University of Physical Education in Gdańsk

Sport
- Sport: Rowing

Elżbieta Jankowska (born 2 October 1964) is a Polish rower.

== Biography ==
Jankowska studied a master's degree in physical education at the University of Physical Education in Gdańsk.

Jankowska is a rower and was coached by Ryszard Olczuk and Ryszard Kędzierski. She competed in the women's coxed four event at the 1988 Summer Olympics.

Jankowska was awarded a commemorative medal for the 100th anniversary of the Polish Association of Rowing Societies (PZTW) [pl].
