= Nobuko Ota =

Japanese rower (born 1969)

Personal information
- Nationality: Japanese
- Born: 6 October 1969 (age 56)

Sport
- Sport: Rowing

Nobuko Ota (太田 信子, Ōta Nobuko; born 6 October 1969) is a Japanese rower. She competed in the women's coxless pair event at the 1992 Summer Olympics.
