= Margarita Teselko =

Soviet rower

Personal information
- Nationality: Soviet
- Born: 1 October 1965 (age 59)

Sport
- Sport: Rowing

Margarita Teselko (born 1 October 1965) is a Soviet rower. She competed in the women's eight event at the 1988 Summer Olympics.
