= Hu Yadong =

Chinese rower

Personal information
- Born: 3 October 1968 (age 57) Beijing, China

Sport
- Sport: Rowing
Medal record
Representing China
Olympic Games
Silver medal – second place	1988 Seoul	Coxed four
Bronze medal – third place	1988 Seoul	Eight
World Rowing Championships
Silver medal – second place	1989 Bled	Coxless four
Bronze medal – third place	1989 Bled	Eight
Asian Games
Gold medal – first place	1990 Beijing	Coxless four
Summer Universiade
Bronze medal – third place	1989 Duisburg	Coxless four

Hu Yadong (Chinese: 胡亚东, born 3 October 1968) is a female Chinese rower. She competed at 1988 Seoul Olympic Games. Together with her teammates, she won a silver medal in the women's coxed four, and a bronze medal in the women's eight.
