= Hanna Motrechko =

Soviet rower

Personal information
- Nationality: Soviet
- Born: 14 May 1965 (age 59)

Sport
- Sport: Rowing

Hanna Motrechko (Ukrainian: Ганна Мотречко; born 14 May 1965) is a Soviet rower. She competed in the women's coxless pair event at the 1992 Summer Olympics.
