= Elke Markwort =

German rower

Personal information
- Nationality: German
- Born: 30 November 1965 (age 59); Berlin, Germany

Sport
- Sport: Rowing

Elke Markwort (born 30 November 1965) is a German rower. She competed in the women's eight event at the 1988 Summer Olympics.
