= Ramona Balthasar =

German rower (born 1964)

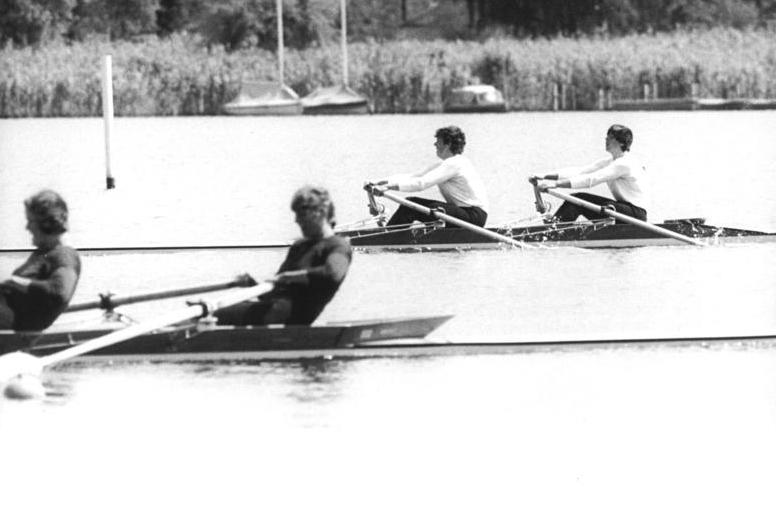
- Balthasar (second from left) in 1985

Personal information
- Born: 9 January 1964 (age 62) Forst, Bezirk Cottbus, East Germany
- Height: 177 cm (5 ft 10 in)
- Weight: 71 kg (157 lb)

Sport
- Sport: Rowing
- Club: SG Dynamo Potsdam; SC Dynamo Berlin
Medal record
Women's rowing
Representing East Germany
Olympic Games
Gold medal – first place	1988 Seoul	Eight
World Rowing Championships
Gold medal – first place	1985 Hazewinkel	Quadruple sculls
Silver medal – second place	1989 Bled	Eight
Silver medal – second place	1990 Lake Barrington	Eight
Summer Universiade
Bronze medal – third place	1987 Zagreb	Quadruple sculls

Ramona Balthasar-Franz (born 9 January 1964) is a German rower.

Balthasar was born in 1964 in Forst, Bezirk Cottbus, East Germany. She initially competed for SG Dynamo Potsdam and was chosen for the 1984 Summer Olympics but did not compete due to the Eastern Bloc boycott. During 1985, she changed to SC Dynamo Berlin. At the 1985 World Rowing Championships in Hazewinkel, she became world champion in the quad scull boat class. She changed from sculling to sweep rowing and at the 1988 Seoul Olympics, she won gold with the women's eight. At the 1989 World Rowing Championships in Bled, she won silver in the same boat class.

In October 1986, she was awarded a Patriotic Order of Merit in gold (first class) for her sporting success. Balthasar studied medicine.
