= Meike Holländer =

German rower

Personal information
- Nationality: German
- Born: 18 January 1965 (age 60); Bremerhaven, Germany

Sport
- Sport: Rowing

Meike Holländer (born 18 January 1965) is a German rower. She competed in the women's eight event at the 1988 Summer Olympics for West Germany.
