= Nataliya Yatsenko =

Soviet rower (born 1961)

Personal information
- Born: Nataliya Ivanovna Yatsenko; 6 September 1961 (age 64) Kyiv, Ukrainian SSR, Soviet Union
- Height: 180 cm (5 ft 11 in)
- Weight: 80 kg (176 lb)

Sport
- Sport: Rowing
Medal record
Women's rowing
Representing the Soviet Union
World Rowing Championships
Gold medal – first place	1981 Munich	Eight
Gold medal – first place	1982 Lucerne	Eight
Gold medal – first place	1983 Duisburg	Eight
Gold medal – first place	1985 Hazewinkel	Eight

Nataliya Ivanovna Yatsenko (later known as Nataliya Fedorenko, born 6 September 1961) is a Soviet rower.

== Biography ==
Yatsenko was born in Kyiv suburb of Sofiïvska Borshchahivka in 1961; at the time, the city was part of the Soviet Union and it has since 1991 been the capital of Ukraine.

Yatsenko initially competed under her maiden name and she first became World Champion in the eight event at the 1981 World Rowing Championships in Munich. She repeated this feat in 1982 in Lucerne and in 1983 in Duisburg. Due to the 1984 Summer Olympics boycott, she did not attend the 1984 Summer Olympics in Los Angeles but competed at the Friendship Games instead where she won a gold medal with the women's eight. At the 1985 World Rowing Championships in Hazewinkel, she won her fourth World Championship.

She competed once more at the 1988 Summer Olympics in Seoul for the Soviet Union with the women's eight, this time under her married name. The team came fourth at the Olympics.
