= Betsy Beard =

American rowing cox (born 1961)

Personal information
- Born: Elizabeth Ann Beard; September 16, 1961 (age 64) Baltimore, Maryland, United States
- Height: 155 cm (5 ft 1 in)
- Weight: 42 kg (93 lb)
Medal record
Women's rowing
Representing the United States
Olympic Games
Gold medal – first place	1984 Los Angeles	Women's eight
World Rowing Championships
Silver medal – second place	1987 Copenhagen	Women's eight

Elizabeth Ann Beard (born September 16, 1961) is a former American competitive coxswain and Olympic gold medalist.

Beard was born in Baltimore, Maryland, United States in 1961. She was a member of the American women's eight team that won the gold medal at the 1984 Summer Olympics in Los Angeles, California. She was the cox for the American women's eight at World Rowing Championships in 1985, 1986, and 1987, and the team came fourth at the first two competitions, and won silver in 1987. At the 1988 Summer Olympics, she came in sixth with the women's eight.
