= Katia Todorova =

Bulgarian rower

Personal information
- Nationality: Bulgarian
- Born: 18 August 1958 (age 66)

Sport
- Sport: Rowing

Katia Todorova (Bulgarian: Катя Тодорова; born 18 August 1958) is a Bulgarian rower. She competed in the women's coxed four event at the 1988 Summer Olympics.
