= Susanne Standish-White =

Zimbabwean rower (born 1956)

Personal information
- Nationality: Zimbabwean
- Born: 3 November 1956 (age 68); Harare, Zimbabwe

Sport
- Sport: Rowing

Susanne Standish-White (born 3 November 1956) is a Zimbabwean rower. She competed in the women's coxless pair event at the 1992 Summer Olympics.
