= David McAllister (disambiguation) =

David McAllister (born 1971) is a German politician and former Minister-President of Lower Saxony.

David McAllister may also refer to:

- David McAllister (dancer) (born 1963), artistic director of The Australian Ballet
- David McAllister (footballer) (born 1988), Irish association footballer for Stevenage

== See also ==
- David McAlister (1951–2015), British actor in The Stones of Blood
- David McAllester (disambiguation)
