= Miyuki Yamashita =

Japanese rower (born 1971)

Personal information
- Nationality: Japanese
- Born: 28 August 1971 (age 54) Toyama, Japan

Sport
- Sport: Rowing

Miyuki Yamashita (山下 美幸, Yamashita Miyuki; born 28 August 1971) is a rower from Toyama, Japan. She competed in the women's coxless pair event at the 1992 Summer Olympics.
