= He Yanwen =

Chinese rower

Olympic medal record

Women's rowing
Bronze medal – third place	1988 Seoul	Eight

He Yanwen (Chinese: 何 燕雯, born 29 September 1966) is a female Chinese rower. She competed at 1988 Seoul Olympic Games. Together with her teammates, she won a bronze medal in the women's eight.
