= Lee Gwang-sun =

South Korean rower

Personal information
- Nationality: South Korean
- Born: 1 April 1969 (age 56)
- Education: Kyonggi University

Korean name
- Hangul: 이광순
- Hanja: 李光順
- RR: I Gwangsun
- MR: I Kwangsun

Sport
- Sport: Rowing

Lee Gwang-sun (Korean: 이광순; born 1 April 1969) is a South Korean rower. She competed in the women's coxed four event at the 1988 Summer Olympics. She attended Kyonggi University.
