= Peg Mallery =

American rower

Personal information
- Full name: Margaret J. Mallery
- Nationality: American
- Born: October 12, 1967 (age 58)

Sport
- Sport: Rowing

Margaret J. "Peg" Mallery (born October 12, 1962) is an American rower. She competed in the women's eight event at the 1988 Summer Olympics.
