= Lidiya Averyanova =

Russian rower

Personal information
- Nationality: Russian
- Born: 4 March 1960 (age 65)

Sport
- Sport: Rowing

Lidiya Averyanova (born 4 March 1960) is a Russian rower. She competed in the women's eight event at the 1988 Summer Olympics.
