= Han Yaqin =

Chinese rower

Olympic medal record

Women's rowing
Bronze medal – third place	1988 Seoul	Eight

Han Yaqin (simplified Chinese: 韩亚琴; traditional Chinese: 韓亞琴; pinyin: Hán Yàqín, born 18 August 1963) is a female Chinese rower. She competed at 1988 Seoul Olympic Games. Together with her teammates, she won a bronze medal in the women's eight.
