= Anja Kluge =

East German rower

Medal record

Women's rowing

Representing East Germany

Olympic Games
Gold medal – first place	1988 Seoul	Eight

Anja Kluge (born 9 November 1964 in Berlin) is a German rower.
