= Heinrich Gottfried Philipp Gengler =

German historian (1817–1901)

Heinrich Gottfried Philipp Gengler (25 July 1817 – 28 November 1901) was a German historian of law, Geheimrat and academic lecturer.

Philipp Gengler was born in Bamberg in Germany. He studied at the University of Würzburg and at the University of Heidelberg. In 1842 he obtained from the University of Erlangen the Ph. D. degree. One year later he qualified there for inauguration. In 1847 he became a lecturer in German legal history at Erlangen University, and in 1851 he was awarded a full professorship at the University of Erlangen. He died in Erlangen, aged 84.

His son was the ornithologíst Josef Gengler.

== Works (selection) ==
- Deutsche Rechtsgeschichte im Grundrisse. Palm, Erlangen 1849 (online, Google).
- Schwabenspiegels Landrechtsbuch. Theodor Blaesing, Erlangen 1853.
- Ueber Aeneas Sylvius in seiner Bedeutung für die deutsche Rechtsgeschichte. Junge, Erlangen 1860 (online, Google).
- Regesten und Urkunden zur Verfassungs- und Rechtsgeschichte der deutschen Städte im Mittelalter. Erster Band, Enke, Erlangen 1863 (online, Google; Additions; Corrections; Table of contents).

== Literature ==
- Werner Schultheiß (1964). "Gengler, Heinrich Gottfried". Neue Deutsche Biographie (in German). Vol. 6. Berlin: Duncker & Humblot. pp. 188–189. (full text online).
