= Christine Campbell (rower) =

American rower

Personal information
- Born: March 19, 1964 (age 61); Chicago, Illinois, United States

Sport
- Sport: Rowing

Christine Campbell (born March 19, 1964) is an American rower. She competed in the women's eight event at the 1988 Summer Olympics.
