= Reda Ribinskaitė =

Lithuanian rower (born 1966)

Personal information
- Nationality: Lithuanian
- Born: 8 June 1966 (age 59) Marijampolė, Lithuanian SSR, Soviet Union

Sport
- Sport: Rowing

Reda Ribinskaitė (born 8 June 1966) is a Lithuanian rower. She competed in the women's coxed four event at the 1988 Summer Olympics.
