= Kerstin Peters =

German rower

Personal information
- Nationality: German
- Born: 27 July 1967 (age 57); Berlin, Germany

Sport
- Sport: Rowing

Kerstin Peters (born 27 July 1967) is a German rowing coxswain. She competed in the women's eight event at the 1988 Summer Olympics.
