= Sandra Brazauskaitė =

Lithuanian rower (born 1964)

Personal information
- Nationality: Lithuanian
- Born: 3 August 1964 (age 61) Tyruliai, Lithuanian SSR, Soviet Union

Sport
- Sport: Rowing

Sandra Brazauskaitė (born 3 August 1964) is a Lithuanian rower. She competed in the women's eight event at the 1988 Summer Olympics.
