= Katrin Petersmann =

German rower

Personal information
- Nationality: German
- Born: 19 July 1967 (age 57)

Sport
- Sport: Rowing

Katrin Petersmann (born 19 July 1967) is a German rower. She competed in the women's eight event at the 1988 Summer Olympics.
