= Susan Broome =

American rower

Personal information
- Nationality: American
- Born: July 14, 1959 (age 65); Fort McClellan, Alabama, United States

Sport
- Sport: Rowing

Susan Broome (born July 14, 1959) is an American rower. She competed in the women's eight event at the 1988 Summer Olympics.
