= Zhou Xiuhua =

Chinese rower

Olympic medal record

Women's rowing
Bronze medal – third place	1988 Seoul	Eight

Zhou Xiuhua (Chinese:周 秀華, born 8 December 1966) is a female Chinese rower. She competed at 1988 Seoul Olympic Games. Together with her teammates, she won a bronze medal in the Eights.
