= Anja Schäfer =

German rower

Personal information
- Nationality: German
- Born: 11 July 1966 (age 58); Hattingen, Germany

Sport
- Sport: Rowing

Anja Schäfer (born 11 July 1966) is a German former rower. She competed in the women's eight event at the 1988 Summer Olympics.
