= Svetla Durchova =

Bulgarian rower (born 1960)

Personal information
- Full name: Svetla Nikolova Durchova
- Nationality: Bulgarian
- Born: 24 October 1960 (age 64); Razlog, Bulgaria

Sport
- Sport: Rowing

Svetla Nikolova Durchova (Bulgarian: Светла Николова Дурчова; born 24 October 1960) is a Bulgarian rower. She competed in the women's coxed four event at the 1988 Summer Olympics.
