= Zhang Yali =

Chinese rower

Olympic medal record

Women's rowing
Bronze medal – third place	1988 Seoul	Eight

Zhang Yali (simplified Chinese: 张亚黎; traditional Chinese: 張亞黎; pinyin: Zhāng Yàlí, born 24 February 1964) is a female Chinese rower. She competed at 1988 Seoul Olympic Games. Together with her teammates, she won a bronze medal in the Eights.
