= Violeta Lastakauskaitė =

Lithuanian rower (born 1965)

Personal information
- Nationality: Lithuanian
- Born: 28 December 1965 (age 59); Primorsky, Russia

Sport
- Sport: Rowing

Violeta Lastakauskaitė (born 28 December 1965) is a Lithuanian rower. She competed in the women's coxless pair event at the 1992 Summer Olympics.
