= 3402 Wisdom =

Mars-crossing asteroid

Discovery
- Discovered by: E. Bowell
- Discovery site: Anderson Mesa Stn.
- Discovery date: 5 August 1981

Designations
- Named after: Jack Wisdom (American planetary scientist)
- Alternative designations: 1981 PB
- Minor planet category: Mars-crosser

Orbital characteristics
- Epoch 23 March 2018 (JD 2458200.5)
- Uncertainty parameter 0
- Observation arc: 41.20 yr (15,047 d)
- Aphelion: 2.7283 AU
- Perihelion: 1.5352 AU
- Semi-major axis: 2.1317 AU
- Eccentricity: 0.2798
- Orbital period (sidereal): 3.11 yr (1,137 d)
- Mean anomaly: 285.37°
- Mean motion: 0° 19^{m} 0.12^{s} / day
- Inclination: 4.8531°
- Longitude of ascending node: 357.87°
- Argument of perihelion: 303.69°
- Earth MOID: 0.5266 AU (205 LD)

Physical characteristics
- Mean diameter: 2.05±0.49 km 2.50±0.50 km 2.59 km (derived)
- Synodic rotation period: 4.9949±0.0001 h 4.9951±0.0001 h (Note: Pravec October (2006) web: lightcurve plot of (3402) Wisdom, with a rotation period 4.9951±0.0001 hours with a brightness amplitude of 0.74±0.02 mag. Quality Code of 3. Observation in the R-band. Absolute magnitude of 14.85±0.11. Summary figures at LCDB and Ondrejov Asteroid Photometry Project (see data sheet))
- Geometric albedo: 0.20 (assumed); 0.283±0.113; 0.32±0.16
- Spectral type: S (assumed)
- Absolute magnitude (H): 14.85±0.11 (R); 15.00; 15.13±0.26; 15.34; 15.44

3402 Wisdom, provisional designation 1981 PB, is a stony asteroid and Mars-crosser on an eccentric orbit from the inner regions of the asteroid belt, approximately 2.5 kilometers (1.6 miles) in diameter. It was discovered on 5 August 1981, by American astronomer Edward Bowell at Lowell's Anderson Mesa Station near Flagstaff, Arizona, in the United States. The presumed bright S-type asteroid has a rotation period of 4.99 hours. It was named after American planetary scientist Jack Wisdom.

== Orbit and classification ==
Wisdom is a Mars-crossing asteroid, a member of a dynamically unstable group, located between the main belt and the near-Earth populations, and crossing the orbit of Mars at 1.666 AU. It orbits the Sun at a distance of 1.5–2.7 AU once every 3 years and 1 month (1,137 days; semi-major axis of 2.13 AU). Its orbit has an eccentricity of 0.28 and an inclination of 5° with respect to the ecliptic.

The body's observation arc begins with a precovery taken at Palomar Observatory in February 1977, more than 4 years prior to its official discovery observation at Anderson Mesa.

== Physical characteristics ==
Wisdom is an assumed stony S-type asteroid.

=== Rotation period ===
In October 2006, two rotational lightcurves of Wisdom were obtained from photometric observations at Ondřejov, Skalnaté pleso and Carbuncle Hill observatories (912;I00). Lightcurve analysis gave a well-defined rotation period of 4.9949 and 4.9951 hours with a high brightness variation of 0.75 and 0.74 magnitude, respectively (U=3/3). A high brightness amplitude typically indicate that the body has an elongated rather than spherical shape.

=== Diameter and albedo ===
According to the survey carried out by the NEOWISE mission of NASA's Wide-field Infrared Survey Explorer, Wisdom measures 2.05 and 2.50 kilometers in diameter and its surface has an albedo of 0.32 and 0.283, respectively. The Collaborative Asteroid Lightcurve Link assumes a standard albedo for stony asteroids of 0.20 and derives a diameter of 2.59 kilometers based on an absolute magnitude of 15.34.

With a mean diameter of approximately 2.5 kilometers, Wisdom is one of the smaller mid-sized Mars-crossing asteroids. It is assumed that there are up to 10 thousand Mars-crossers larger than 1 kilometer. The largest members of this dynamical group are 132 Aethra, 323 Brucia, 2204 Lyyli and 512 Taurinensis, which measure between 43 and 25 kilometers in diameter.

== Naming ==
This minor planet was named after Jack Wisdom (born 1953), a dynamicist and professor of planetary sciences at MIT. Wisdom pioneered in the study of the dynamics and long-term stability of the Solar System, and demonstrated the dynamical mechanism for the clearing of asteroid in the Kirkwood gaps of the asteroid belt. The official naming citation was published by the Minor Planet Center on 2 February 1988 (M.P.C. 12803).
