= Lee Jae-nam =

South Korean rower (born 1972)

Personal information
- Nationality: South Korean
- Born: 25 March 1972 (age 53)

Sport
- Sport: Rowing

Lee Jae-nam (born 25 March 1972) is a South Korean rower. She competed in the women's coxless pair event at the 1992 Summer Olympics.
