= Daniela Neunast =

East German coxswain

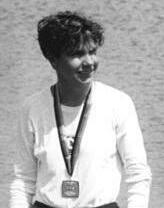
- Neunast in 1985

Personal information
- Born: 19 September 1966 (age 59) Potsdam, East Germany
- Height: 1.58 m (5 ft 2 in)
- Weight: 45 kg (99 lb)

Sport
- Sport: Rowing
- Club: Sportclub Dynamo Potsdam; Rudernclub Hansa Dortmund
Medal record
Women's rowing
Olympic Games
Representing East Germany
Gold medal – first place	1988 Seoul	Eight
Representing Germany
Bronze medal – third place	1992 Barcelona	Eight
World Rowing Championships
Representing East Germany
Gold medal – first place	1985 Hazewinkel	Coxed four
Silver medal – second place	1986 Nottingham	Eight
Silver medal – second place	1989 Bled	Eight
Representing Germany
Bronze medal – third place	1993 Roudnice	Eight

Daniela Neunast (born 19 September 1966) is a retired German coxswain. She competed in the eights at the 1988, 1992 and 1996 Summer Olympics and finished in first, third and eighth place, respectively. She also won one gold, two silver and one bronze medal at the world championships of 1985–1989.
