= David A. McAllester =

American computer scientist (born 1956)

- Born: May 30, 1956 (age 70); United States
- Education: Massachusetts Institute of Technology
- Known for: Artificial intelligence
- Awards: AAAI Classic Paper Award (2010); International Conference on Logic Programming Test of Time award (2014)
- Scientific career
- Fields: Computer Science, Artificial Intelligence, Machine Learning
- Workplaces: Massachusetts Institute of Technology; Toyota Technological Institute at Chicago
- Doctoral advisor: Gerald Sussman

David A. McAllester (born May 30, 1956) is an American computer scientist who is professor and former chief academic officer at the Toyota Technological Institute at Chicago. He received his B.S., M.S. and PhD degrees from the Massachusetts Institute of Technology in 1978, 1979 and 1987 respectively. His PhD was supervised by Gerald Sussman. He was on the faculty of Cornell University for the academic year 1987–1988 and on the faculty of MIT from 1988 to 1995. He was a member of technical staff at AT&T Labs-Research from 1995 to 2002. He has been a fellow of the American Association of Artificial Intelligence since 1997.

McAllester's research areas include machine learning theory, the theory of programming languages, automated reasoning, AI planning, computer game playing (computer chess) and computational linguistics. A 1991 paper on AI planning proved to be one of the most influential papers of the decade in that area. A 1993 paper on computer game algorithms influenced the design of the algorithms used in the Deep Blue chess system that defeated Garry Kasparov.

== Opinions on artificial intelligence ==
McAllester has voiced concerns about the potential dangers of artificial intelligence, writing in an article to the Pittsburgh Tribune-Review that it is inevitable that fully automated intelligent machines will be able to design and build smarter, better versions of themselves, an event known as the singularity. The singularity would enable machines to become infinitely intelligent, and would pose an "incredibly dangerous scenario". McAllester estimates a 10 percent probability of the Singularity occurring within 25 years, and a 90 percent probability of it occurring within 75 years. He appeared on the AAAI Presidential Panel on Long-Term AI Futures in 2009, and considers the dangers of superintelligent AI worth taking seriously:

I am uncomfortable saying that we are ninety-nine per cent certain that we are safe for fifty years... That feels like hubris to me.

He was later described as discussing the singularity at the panel in terms of two major milestones in artificial intelligence:

1) Operational Sentience: We can easily converse with computers. 2) The AI Chain Reaction: A computer that boot straps itself to a better self. Repeat.

McAllester has also written on friendly artificial intelligence on his blog. He says that before machines become capable of programming themselves (potentially leading to the singularity), there should be a period where they are moderately intelligent in which it should be possible to test out giving them a purpose or mission that should render them safe to humans:

I personally believe that it is likely that within a decade agents will be capable of compelling conversation about the everyday events that are the topics of non-technical dinner conversations. I think this will happen long before machines can program themselves leading to an intelligence explosion. The early stages of artificial general intelligence (AGI) will be safe. However, the early stages of AGI will provide an excellent test bed for the servant mission or other approaches to friendly AI ... If there is a coming era of safe (not too intelligent) AGI then we will have time to think further about later more dangerous eras.
