= Jacques Laskar =

French astronomer (born 1955)

Jacques Laskar (born 28 April 1955 in Paris) is a French astronomer. He is a research director at the French National Centre for Scientific Research (CNRS), and a member of Astronomy and dynamical systems of the Institute of Celestial Mechanics and Computation of Ephemerides (French: IMCCE) of the Paris Observatory. He received the CNRS Silver Medal in 1994 and the Milutin Milankovic Medal in 2019. Since 2003, he is a member of the French Academy of Sciences.

== Education and early teaching career ==
After attending the École Normale Supérieure de Cachan, Jacques Laskar taught secondary school from 1977 to 1980 and passed the aggregation in mathematics in 1981. He then studied astronomy and celestial mechanics, finishing his thesis in 1984. He became a CNRS researcher at the Bureau des Longitudes in 1985.

== Research work ==
=== Stability of the Solar System ===
In 1989, Laskar provided evidence that the Solar System is chaotic instead of quasi-periodic as originally determined by Laplace and Lagrange. More specifically, his estimate of the maximum Lyapunov exponent measuring the exponential divergence of two nearby orbits is $1/5 \; \text{Myr}^{-1}$, meaning that it is possible to predict the trajectories of the Solar System over 10 Myr but fundamentally impossible over more than 100 Myr. This chaoticity comes mainly from the inner planets Mercury, Venus, the Earth, and Mars.

In 2009, he and his colleague Mickaël Gastineau generated numerical simulations of orbital instability over the next five billion years. Their model, unlike those used by previous researchers, took into account Albert Einstein's theory of general relativity. This made little difference over a short time span, but resulted in dramatically different orbital paths over long times. The researchers looked at 2501 possible scenarios, 25 of which ended with a severely disrupted solar system.

=== Chaotic obliquity of the planets ===
Laskar also contributed to the study of the evolution of the skew planets of the solar system. One can for example include his work on retrograde rotation of Venus. With his colleague Alexandre Correia, at Astronomie et Systemes Dynamiques of Paris, he found out that the atmosphere may simply have slowed the planet down and then started it spinning the other way. This insidious process would have been the unique result of the thick atmosphere always lagging behind as the planet rotates.

=== Paleoclimates ===
He has contributed to the astronomical theory of paleoclimates, studying the orbits of the planets and the obliquity of the solar system and relating it to the study of climate on geological time scales

== See also ==
- Celestial mechanics
- Chaos theory
- Milankovitch cycles
- Stability of the Solar System
