= Aušra Gudeliūnaitė =

Lithuanian rower (born 1963)

Personal information
- Nationality: Lithuanian
- Born: 5 September 1963 (age 62) Vilnius, Lithuanian SSR, Soviet Union

Sport
- Sport: Rowing

Aušra Gudeliūnaitė (born 5 September 1963) is a Lithuanian rowing coxswain. She competed in the women's eight event at the 1988 Summer Olympics.
