= Jennifer Walinga =

Canadian rower

Personal information
- Born: Jennifer Walinga; January 9, 1965 (age 61) Peterborough, Ontario, Canada
- Spouse: Craig White
- Website: www.integratedfocus.ca

Sport
- Country: Canada
- Retired: 1992
Medal record
Women's rowing
Representing Canada
Commonwealth Games
Gold medal – first place	1986 Edinburgh	Coxed four
World Rowing Championships
Gold medal – first place	1991 Vienna	Eight
Gold medal – first place	1991 Vienna	Coxless four
Bronze medal – third place	1986 Nottingham	Coxed four
Summer Universiade
Silver medal – second place	1989 Duisburg	Coxless fours

Jennifer Walinga (née Doey, born January 9, 1965) is a retired rower who competed between the 1980s to 1990s. As a member of the national rowing team for Canada, Walinga placed 4th at the 1983 Junior World Championships in Vichy, France, 2nd at the 1984 U23 Sr B World Championships in Copenhagen, Denmark, and 5th at the 1985 World Rowing Championships in Hazewinkel, Belgium. In coxed four events, Walinga won gold at the 1986 Commonwealth Games and bronze at the 1986 World Rowing Championships. At the 1987 World Championships, the team placed 5th in Copenhagen, Denmark. She and her crew of Tricia Smith, Heather Clarke, and Jane Tregunno (Stamp) had a seventh place finish in the coxed four at the 1988 Summer Olympics.

During the 1990s, Walinga placed 2nd at the World Universiade in Duisburg, Germany and 4th in the women's coxless pair at Lake Barrington, Tasmania 1990 World Championships. She and her team then won gold in the coxed four and eight events at the 1991 World Rowing Championships. She retired from competing before she was supposed to compete at the 1992 Summer Olympics. Outside of rowing, Walinga began teaching at St. Michaels University School in 1992 before expanding her career to Royal Roads University in 2000. Walinga was inducted into the Canada's Sports Hall of Fame in 2013 and the Canadian Rowing Hall of Fame in 2017. In 2024, she was inducted into the Brock University Hall of Fame.

== Early life and education ==
Walinga was born January 9, 1965, in Scarborough, Ontario, and moved to Peterborough, Ontario, when she was 6. She went to Peterborough Collegiate for high school and played in various sports including volleyball, track, and basketball. For her post-secondary studies, Walinga started at Brock University with a Bachelor of Liberal Studies in 1987 before obtaining a Bachelor of Education from the University of Western Ontario the following year. She later went on to earn a Master of Arts in Leadership at Royal Roads University and a PhD in Organizational Studies at the University of Victoria, BC.

== Career ==
Walinga started her rowing career in the 1980s with the Peterborough Rowing Club. She started to compete in international rowing competitions at the 1983 World Rowing Junior Championships and became a member of the Senior National rowing team of Canada in 1984. The following year, she participated at the 1985 World Rowing Championships and placed 5th in the Women's 8 with coxswain.

In 1986, Walinga won a gold medal in the coxed four event at the 1986 Commonwealth Games. Later that year, she received a bronze at the 1986 World Rowing Championships in coxed four. After a 7th-place finish at the 1988 Summer Olympics in coxed four, she won gold at the 1991 World Rowing Championships in coxed four and eight. Although she was supposed to compete at the 1992 Summer Olympics, Walinga was forced to withdraw before racing in the heat at the Olympics due to a back injury. The team's spare, Kay Worthington, a multi Olympian, was able to replace Walinga in the four and help the team won gold in both the four and eight races. After the Olympics, Walinga's crew mate Brenda Taylor, presented Walinga with one of her two medals to signify her contributions to the wins.

Upon retiring from rowing, Walinga taught in Toronto York District and then in Victoria BC in the Sooke District, finally establishing herself as an English teacher and Rowing coach at St. Michaels University School from 1992 to 2007. While at St, Michaels, she starting working at Royal Roads University in 2000 and became the university's School of Communication & Culture director in 2008.

== Awards and honors ==
In 2013, Walinga was inducted into the Canada's Sports Hall of Fame. The same year, she became a member of the Peterborough and District Sports Hall of Fame. In 2017, she was inducted into the Canadian Rowing Hall of Fame as a member of the 1992 Canadian Olympic Coxless Fours team.

== Personal life ==
Walinga is married with three children. She is a full professor at Royal Roads University and continues to compete in rowing at the Head of the Charles in Boston, MA, and other masters championships events. Her and her 90's crew have won many masters golds.
