= Todorka Vasileva =

Bulgarian rower

Personal information
- Nationality: Bulgarian
- Born: 24 January 1958 (age 67); Pazardzhik, Bulgaria

Sport
- Sport: Rowing

Todorka Vasileva (born 24 January 1958) is a Bulgarian rower. She competed at the 1980 Summer Olympics and the 1988 Summer Olympics.
