= Jack Wisdom =

American planetary scientist (born 1953)

- Born: January 28, 1953 (age 73); Lubbock, Texas
- Education: Caltech (Ph.D., 1981); Rice University (B.S., 1976)
- Scientific career
- Fields: Planetary Science
- Workplaces: Massachusetts Institute of Technology
- Doctoral advisor: Peter Goldreich

Jack Wisdom (born 1953) is an American planetary scientist and Professor of Planetary Sciences at the Massachusetts Institute of Technology.

== History ==
He received his B.S. from Rice University in 1976 and his Ph.D. from California Institute of Technology in 1981. His research interests are the dynamics of the Solar System.

Wisdom pioneered the study of chaos in the solar system. His 1981 dissertation demonstrated for the first time the theoretical reason for the clearing of the Kirkwood gaps in the asteroid belt. His work has also brought to light the chaotic rotation of Hyperion, chaos in the orbital evolution of Pluto, and the chaotic obliquity of Mars which has important implications for the past Martian climate.

Work with colleague Gerald Sussman using a specially-built computer demonstrated that the solar system as a whole is chaotic on a timescale of about four million years, confirming results from Jacques Laskar. This work was responsible for "shattering the long-held view of the clockwork motion of the planets."

More recently, Wisdom's work has shed light on the complex evolution of the Moon and the tidal heating and dynamics of Enceladus.

In addition, Wisdom is credited with developing "numerous analytical and numerical techniques" that are fundamental to modern celestial mechanics, most notably the symplectic map for the n-body problem (developed together with Matthew J. Holman), which "now forms the core of nearly every solar system dynamics integration scheme in use today."

Jack Wisdom is co-author of Structure and Interpretation of Classical Mechanics. His 2003 paper in Science on a new geometric phase effect which Wisdom calls "spacetime swimming" has attracted considerable attention, although it is not yet clear whether this effect has practical utility or even can be used to devise new tests of relativistic gravitation theories.

== Awards and honors ==
- H. C. Urey Prize of the American Astronomical Society (1986)
- Helen B. Warner Prize for Astronomy of the AAS (1987)
- The asteroid 3402 Wisdom was named in his honor (1988)
- MacArthur Fellowship from the MacArthur Foundation (1994)
- Brouwer Award of the Division on Dynamical Astronomy of the American Astronomical Society (2001)
- Elected a Legacy Fellow of the American Astronomical Society in 2020.
