= Gerlinde Doberschütz =

East German rower

Medal record

Women's rowing

Representing East Germany

Olympic Games
Gold medal – first place	1988 Seoul	Coxed four

Gerlinde Doberschütz (née Mey; born 26 October 1964, in Meiningen) is a German rower, and brother-in-law Jens Doberschütz was also a successful rower. Doberschütz was trained by Herta Weissig.
