= Kim Sung-ok =

South Korean rower (born 1970)

Personal information
- Nationality: South Korean
- Born: 21 July 1970 (age 55)

Korean name
- Hangul: 김성옥
- RR: Gim Seongok
- MR: Kim Sŏngok

Sport
- Sport: Rowing

Kim Sung-ok (Korean: 김성옥; born 21 July 1970) is a South Korean rower. She competed in the women's coxless pair event at the 1992 Summer Olympics.
