= Park Mi-jeong =

South Korean rower

Personal information
- Nationality: South Korean
- Born: 3 March 1968 (age 57)

Sport
- Sport: Rowing

Park Mi-jeong (born 3 March 1968) is a South Korean rower. She competed in the women's coxed four event at the 1988 Summer Olympics.
