= Liene Sastapa =

Latvian rower (born 1972)

Personal information
- Born: 14 January 1972 (age 53) Riga, Latvia
- Height: 179 cm (5 ft 10 in)
- Weight: 75 kg (165 lb)

Sport
- Country: Latvia
- Sport: Rowing

Liene Sastapa (born 14 January 1972) is a Latvian rower. She competed in the women's coxless pair event at the 1992 Summer Olympics.
