= Carola Hornig =

East German rower

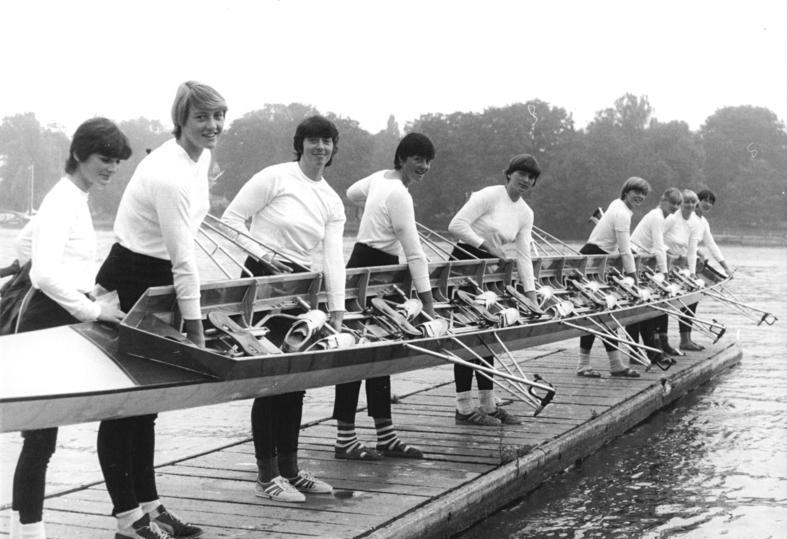
- 1982 from the left: Kirsten Wenzel (coxswain), Claudia Noack, Ute Steindorf, Sabine Portius, Carola Miseler, Steffi Götzelt, Sigrid Anders, Iris Rudolph, and Karin Metze

Medal record

Women's rowing

Representing East Germany

Olympic Games
Gold medal – first place	1988 Seoul	Coxed four

World Rowing Championships
Silver medal – second place	1985 Hazewinkel	Eight
Silver medal – second place	1986 Nottingham	Eight
Silver medal – second place	1987 Copenhagen	Coxed four

Carola Hornig (née Miseler, born 30 April 1962 in Stendal) is a German rower.
