= Jennifer Corbet =

American rower

Personal information
- Born: May 27, 1965 (age 60); Jackson Hole, Wyoming, United States

Sport
- Sport: Rowing

Jennifer Corbet (born May 27, 1965) is an American magazine publisher and former rower. She competed in 10987 World Rowing Championships in Copenhagen in the United States women's straight pair, and in the women's coxed four event at the 1988 Summer Olympics.

After rowing and graduating from Brown University, also rowing on their university's team and studying environmental studies, Corbet worked for the United States Forest Service. During the administration of president Bill Clinton, Corbet helped collate and respond to over 120,000 comments from the public regarding Clinton's Forest Plan. After her time in the Forest Service, Corbet became a publisher for three outdoor-focused magazines: Evergreen Living, Foothills Living, and Conifer-285 Living.
