= Aušra (given name) =

- Gender: Female
- Language: Lithuanian
- Name day: 27 April

Origin
- Meaning: Dawn
- Region of origin: Lithuania

Aušra is a Lithuanian feminine given name meaning "dawn". People bearing the name Aušra include:

- Aušra Arciševskaja (born 2001), a Lithuanian handball player
- Aušra Augustinavičiūtė (1927–2005), a Lithuanian psychologist and sociologist
- Aušra Bimbaitė (born 1982), a Lithuanian basketball player
- Aušra Fridrikas (born 1967), a Lithuanian–Austrian handball player
- Aušra Gudeliūnaitė (born 1963), a Lithuanian rowing coxswain
- Aušra Maldeikienė (born 1958), a Lithuanian economist, politician, educator, publicist and author
- Aušra Marija Sluckaitė-Jurašienė (born 1936), a Lithuanian writer, literary critic, and journalist
- Aušra Šponė (born 2001), a Lithuanian handball player
