= Eight at the Olympics =

Olympic sport

Eight (rowing) at the Olympic Games
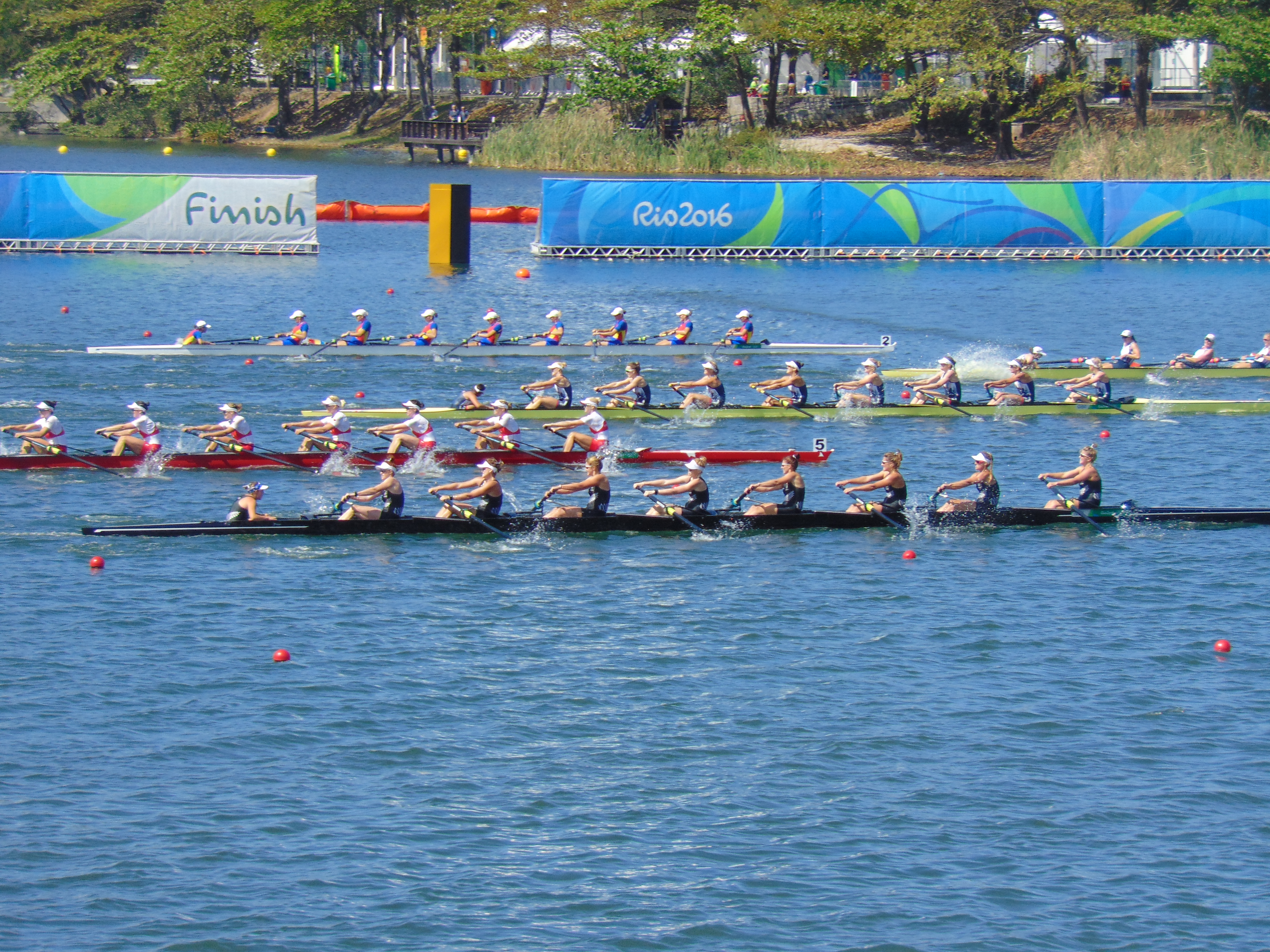
- Women's eight race at the 2016 Summer Olympics

Overview
- Sport: Rowing
- Gender: Men and women
- Years held: Men: 1900–2024; Women: 1976–2024

Reigning champion
- Men: Great Britain
- Women: Romania

The eight is a rowing event held at the Summer Olympics. The event was first held for men at the second modern Olympics in 1900, with races taking place on the Seine in Paris, and has been held at every Games since. The women's event was added when women's rowing was added to the Olympic programme in 1976, and has been held at every Games since 1996, it is the only Olympic rowing event that uses a coxswain.

== Medalists ==
=== Men ===
Games	Gold	Silver	Bronze
1900 Paris	United States	Belgium	Netherlands
1904 St. Louis	United States	Canada	None awarded
1908 London	Great Britain	Belgium	Canada; Great Britain
1912 Stockholm	Great Britain	Great Britain	Germany
1920 Antwerp	United States	Great Britain	Norway
1924 Paris	United States	Canada	Italy
1928 Amsterdam	United States	Great Britain	Canada
1932 Los Angeles	United States	Italy	Canada
1936 Berlin	United States	Italy	Germany
1948 London	United States	Great Britain	Norway
1952 Helsinki	United States	Soviet Union	Australia
1956 Melbourne	United States	Canada	Australia
1960 Rome	United Team of Germany	Canada	Czechoslovakia
1964 Tokyo	United States	United Team of Germany	Czechoslovakia
1968 Mexico City	West Germany	Australia	Soviet Union
1972 Munich	New Zealand	United States	East Germany
1976 Montreal	East Germany	Great Britain	New Zealand
1980 Moscow	East Germany	Great Britain	Soviet Union
1984 Los Angeles	Canada	United States	Australia
1988 Seoul	West Germany	Soviet Union	United States
1992 Barcelona	Canada	Romania	Germany
1996 Atlanta	Netherlands	Germany	Russia
2000 Sydney	Great Britain	Australia	Croatia
2004 Athens	United States	Netherlands	Australia
2008 Beijing	Canada	Great Britain	United States
2012 London	Germany	Canada	Great Britain
2016 Rio de Janeiro	Great Britain	Germany	Netherlands
2020 Tokyo	New Zealand	Germany	Great Britain
2024 Paris	Great Britain	Netherlands	United States
2028 Los Angeles			

==== Medalists by country ====
Rank	Nation	Gold	Silver	Bronze	Total
1	United States	12	2	3	16
2	Great Britain	5	7	3	14
3	Canada	3	5	3	11
4	East Germany	2	0	1	3
4	New Zealand	2	0	1	3
6	West Germany	2	0	0	2
7	Germany	1	3	3	7
8	Netherlands	1	2	2	4
9	United Team of Germany	1	1	0	2
10	Australia	0	2	4	6
11	Soviet Union	0	2	2	4
12	Italy	0	2	1	3
13	Belgium	0	2	0	2
14	Romania	0	1	0	1
15	Czechoslovakia	0	0	2	2
15	Norway	0	0	2	2
17	Croatia	0	0	1	1
17	Russia	0	0	1	1

=== Women ===
Games	Gold	Silver	Bronze
1976 Montreal	East Germany	Soviet Union	United States
1980 Moscow	East Germany	Soviet Union	Romania
1984 Los Angeles	United States	Romania	Netherlands
1988 Seoul	East Germany	Romania	China
1992 Barcelona	Canada	Romania	Germany
1996 Atlanta	Romania	Canada	Belarus
2000 Sydney	Romania	Netherlands	Canada
2004 Athens	Romania	United States	Netherlands
2008 Beijing	United States	Netherlands	Romania
2012 London	United States	Canada	Netherlands
2016 Rio de Janeiro	United States	Great Britain	Romania
2020 Tokyo	Canada	New Zealand	China
2024 Paris	Romania	Canada	Great Britain
2028 Los Angeles			

==== Medalists by country ====
Rank	Nation	Gold	Silver	Bronze	Total
1	Romania	4	3	3	10
2	United States	4	1	1	6
3	East Germany	3	0	0	3
4	Canada	2	2	1	5
5	Netherlands	0	2	3	5
6	Soviet Union	0	2	0	2
7	Great Britain	0	1	1	2
7	New Zealand	0	1	0	1
9	Belarus	0	0	1	1
9	China	0	0	2	2
9	Germany	0	0	1	1
