= Zyta Jarka =

Polish rower

Personal information
- Nationality: Polish
- Born: 21 July 1962 (age 63); Więcbork, Poland

Sport
- Sport: Rowing

Zyta Jarka (born 21 July 1962) is a Polish rower. She competed in the women's coxed four event at the 1988 Summer Olympics.
