= Sylvia Rose =

East German rowing cox

Medal record

Women's rowing

Representing East Germany

Olympic Games
Gold medal – first place	1988 Seoul	Coxed four

World Rowing Championships
Silver medal – second place	1986 Nottingham	Coxed four
Silver medal – second place	1987 Copenhagen	Coxed four

Sylvia Rose (née Müller, born 23 December 1962 in Barth, East Germany) is a German rowing coxswain.
