= Heather Clarke =

Canadian rower (born 1958)

Personal information
- Born: 25 July 1958 (age 66); Stouffville, Ontario, Canada

Sport
- Sport: Rowing

Heather Clarke (born 25 July 1958) is a Canadian rower. She competed in the women's coxed four event at the 1988 Summer Olympics.
