= Structure and Interpretation of Classical Mechanics =

Textbook by Gerald Jay Sussman and Jack Wisdom with Meinhard E. Mayer

- Author: Gerald Jay Sussman and Jack Wisdom
- Subject: Classical mechanics
- Publisher: MIT Press
- Publication date: 2001
- Publication place: United States

Structure and Interpretation of Classical Mechanics (SICM) is a classical mechanics textbook written by Gerald Jay Sussman and Jack Wisdom with Meinhard E. Mayer. The first edition was published by MIT Press in 2001, and a second edition was released in 2015. The book is used at the Massachusetts Institute of Technology to teach a class in advanced classical mechanics, starting with Lagrange's equations and proceeding through canonical perturbation theory.

SICM explains some physical phenomena by showing computer programs for simulating them. These programs are written in the Scheme programming language, as were the programs in Sussman's earlier computer science textbook, Structure and Interpretation of Computer Programs.

Sussman wrote:

Classical mechanics is deceptively simple. It is surprisingly easy to get the right answer with fallacious reasoning or without the real understanding. To address this problem Jack Wisdom and I, with help from Hardy Mayer, have written [Structure and Interpretation of Classical Mechanics] and are teaching a class at MIT that uses computational techniques to communicate a deeper understanding of Classical mechanics. We use computational algorithms to express the methods used to analyze dynamical phenomena. Expressing the methods in a computer language forces them to be unambiguous and computationally effective. Formulating a method as a computer-executable program and debugging that program is a powerful exercise in the learning process. Also, once formalized procedurally, a mathematical idea becomes a tool that can be used directly to compute results.

The entire text is freely available online from the publisher's website.

== Editions ==
- Sussman, Gerald Jay; Wisdom, Jack; Mayer, Meinhard E. (2001). Structure and Interpretation of Classical Mechanics. Cambridge, Massachusetts: MIT Press. ISBN 0262194554. OCLC 45223598.
- Sussman, Gerald Jay; Wisdom, Jack (6 February 2015). Structure and Interpretation of Classical Mechanics (Second ed.). Cambridge, Massachusetts: MIT Press. ISBN 9780262028967. OCLC 905916340.
