= Birte Siech =

German rower

Medal record

Women's rowing

Representing East Germany

Olympic Games
Gold medal – first place	1988 Seoul	Coxed four

World Rowing Championships
Silver medal – second place	1987 Copenhagen	Coxed four
Bronze medal – third place	1990 Tasmania	Coxless pair

Representing Germany

Olympic Games
Bronze medal – third place	1992 Barcelona	Coxless four

Birte Siech (born 19 March 1967 in East Berlin) is a German rower.
