= Kim Santiago =

American rower

Kimberly Stantiago
Personal information
- Full name: Kimberly Ann Santiago
- Born: November 23, 1961 (age 63); Evanston, Illinois, United States
- Height: 157 cm (5 ft 2 in)
- Weight: 99 lb (45 kg)

Sport
- Sport: Rowing

Kimberly Ann Santiago (born November 23, 1961) is an American Olympic athlete and professional rowing coxswain. She was a member of Team USA in the 1988 Summer Olympics and the 1992 Summer Olympics.

Her team finished 5th in the 1988 Summer Olympics in Seoul. In the 1987 World Rowing Championships in Copenhagen, she also placed 5th. At the 1986 Goodwill Games in Moscow, Santiago's team placed 2nd.
