= Josef Gengler =

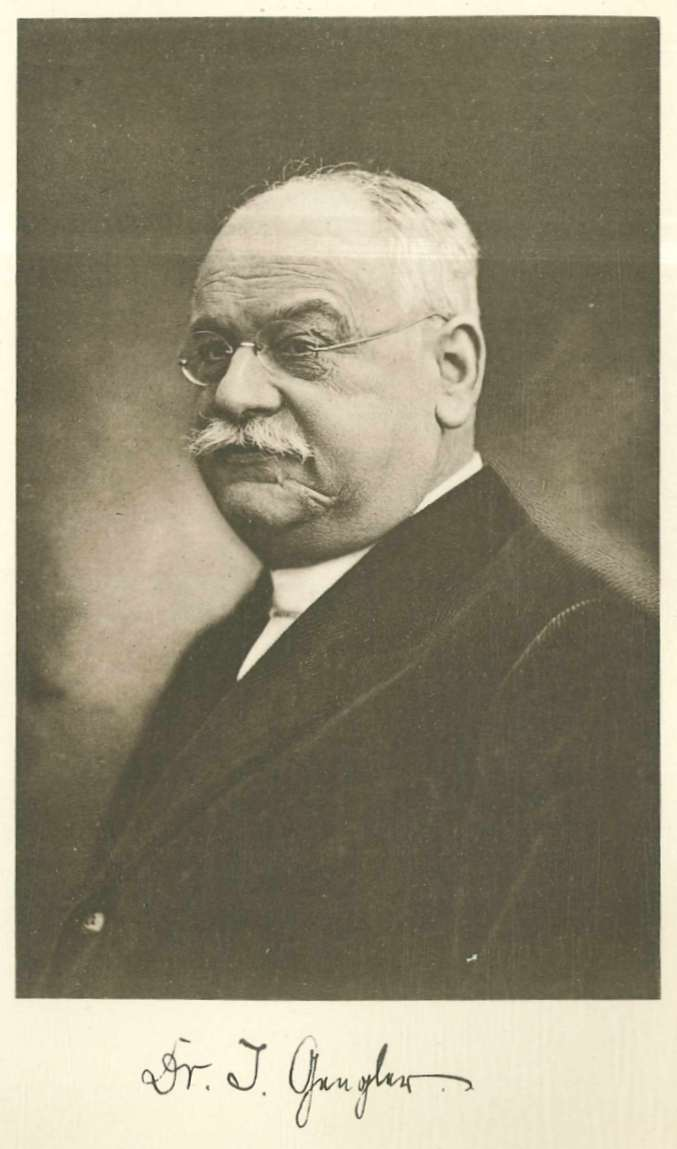
In 1925

Josef Gengler (13 April 1863 – 27 April 1931) was a German physician and ornithologist. He studied the systematics of wheatears, finches (Emberiza citrinella and Fringilla coelebs) and the Palearctic thrushes. He also studied the birds of the Balkans and had a collection of nearly 3000 skins.

== Life and work ==
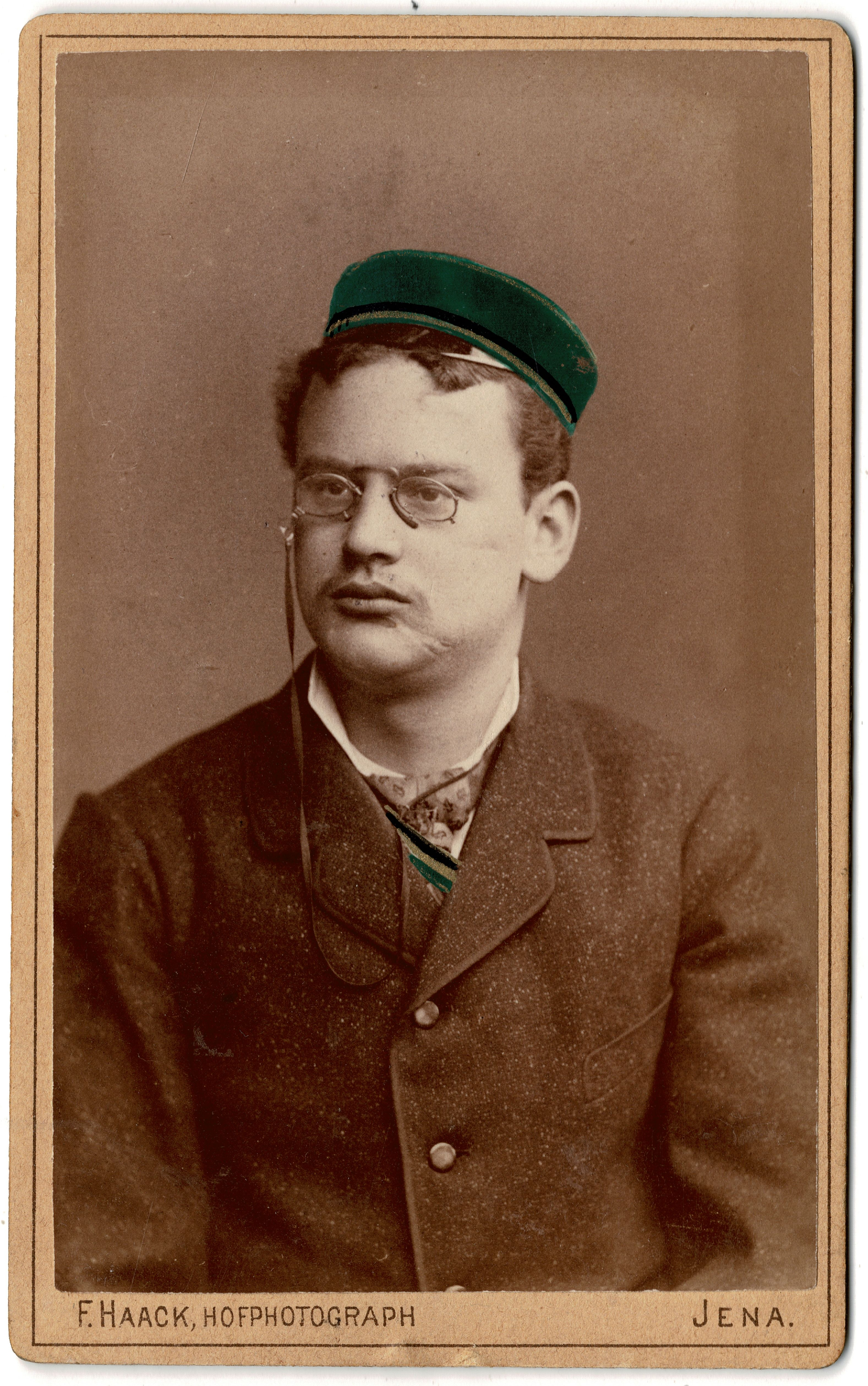
In his student years

Gengler was born in Erlangen, the son of Germanist and legal history professor Heinrich Gottfried Philipp Gengler. He was interested in birds even as a young boy. He studied medicine at the Friedrich-Alexander-Universität Erlangen, Universität Jena and Ludwig-Maximilians-Universität München, He joined as a physician in the Bavarian army in 1884 with the Corps Baruthia. He worked at Metz and Erlangen and became a senior medical officer. He left the army in 1910 but rejoined during World War I. During this period he travelled in the Balkans and collected birds in his spare time. He wrote about this in a 1920 book dedicated to his mentor Viktor von Tschusi-Schmidhoffen. After the war he lived in Erlangen, studying folklore and birds. He joined the Bavarian ornithologists' association in 1897, just a month after it was founded. He donated his bird skins, more than 3000, to the Munich zoological collections in 1928. The Bavarian academy of sciences gave him a silver medal for his contribution. Apart from ornithology, he also took an interest in the Bavarian dialect and contributed to the lexicon. Genglerstraße in Erlangen was named after him in 1964.
