= Ingeburg Schwerzmann =

German rower (born 1967)

Personal information
- Born: Ingeburg Althoff; 2 June 1967 (age 59) Münster, Germany

Sport
- Sport: Rowing
Medal record
Women's rowing
Representing West Germany
World Rowing Championships
Gold medal – first place	1990 Tasmania	W2-
Representing Germany
Olympic Games
Silver medal – second place	1992 Barcelona	Coxless pair
World Rowing Championships
Silver medal – second place	1991 Vienna	W2-

Ingeburg Schwerzmann (née Althoff, born 2 June 1967 in Münster) is a German rower. She married the Swiss rower Beat Schwerzmann at the end of 1991 and competed from the 1992 rowing season under her married name.
