= Kim Mi-jung (sport shooter) =

South Korean sport shooter (born 1977)

Kim Mi-jung (born 1977) is a South Korean sport shooter who competed in the 1998 Asian Games and won a bronze medal in 10 meter air pistol team event.
