= Cynthia Eckert =

American rower (born 1965)

Personal information
- Born: October 27, 1965 (age 60) Evanston, Illinois, U.S.
Medal record
Women's rowing
Representing United States
Olympic Games
Silver medal – second place	1992 Barcelona	Coxless fours
World Rowing Championships
Silver medal – second place	1990 Tasmania	W8+
Silver medal – second place	1991 Vienna	W4-

Cynthia L. Eckert (born October 27, 1965, in Evanston, Illinois) is an American rower.

== Personal life ==
Eckert is married to Jack Rusher, they met while on the national team. They have three children, Kay, Alison, and Nicholas Rusher. Alison and Nicholas are also both Olympic rowers.
