= Mariana Stoyanova =

Bulgarian rower

Personal information
- Nationality: Bulgarian
- Born: 3 July 1967 (age 57); Sandanski, Bulgaria

Sport
- Sport: Rowing

Mariana Stoyanova (Bulgarian: Мариана Стоянова; born 3 July 1967) is a Bulgarian rower. She competed at the 1988 Summer Olympics and the 1992 Summer Olympics.
