= Greta Georgieva =

Bulgarian rowing cox

Personal information
- Nationality: Bulgarian
- Born: 19 April 1965 (age 59)

Sport
- Sport: Rowing

Greta Georgieva (Bulgarian: Грета Георгиева; born 19 April 1965) is a Bulgarian rowing coxswain. She competed in two events at the 1988 Summer Olympics.
