= Olya Stoichkova =

Bulgarian rower

Personal information
- Nationality: Bulgarian
- Born: 19 November 1964 (age 60); Sofia, Bulgaria

Sport
- Sport: Rowing

Olya Stoichkova (Bulgarian: Оля Стоичкова; born 19 November 1964) is a Bulgarian rower. She competed in two events at the 1988 Summer Olympics.
