= Aušra (newspaper) =

Aušra (transl. Dawn) is the name of several Lithuanian-language periodicals:

- Aušra (4 issues in 1880–1881) published using a hectograph in Moscow by Lithuanian students
- Aušra (40 issues in 1883–1886) published in Ragnit and Tilsit by activists of the Lithuanian National Revival
- Aušra (258 issues in 1896–1899) published in Tilsit by Enzys Jagomastas
- Aušra (Vilnius newspaper) (1911–1915, 1919) published in Vilnius for Lithuanians in the Vilnius Region
- Aušra (52 issues in 1931–1932) published daily in Kaunas as a replacement for the discontinued Rytas
- Aušra (1941–1944) was a Catholic periodical published in Brooklyn, NY
- Aušra (since 1960) published in Warsaw, Puńsk, and Sejny by the Lithuanian minority in Poland
- Aušra (10 issues in 1975–1988) was a samizdat published by Lithuanian priests protesting Soviet policies; it was republished in the United States
