= Violeta Zareva =

Bulgarian rower

Personal information
- Full name: Violeta Ivanova Zareva
- Nationality: Bulgarian
- Born: 29 May 1968 (age 58) Sofia, Bulgaria

Sport
- Sport: Rowing
Medal record
Representing Bulgaria
Summer Universiade
Gold medal – first place	1987 Zagreb	Coxless pairs

Violeta Ivanova Zareva (Bulgarian: Виолета Иванова Зарева; born 29 May 1968) is a Bulgarian rower. She competed at the 1988 Summer Olympics and the 1992 Summer Olympics.

Her sister Teodora Zareva is also an Olympic rower.
