= Sarah Gengler =

American rower (born 1963)

Personal information
- Nationality: American
- Born: February 15, 1963 (age 62); Milwaukee, Wisconsin, United States

Sport
- Sport: Rowing

Sarah Gengler (born February 15, 1963; since marriage she has used the name Sarah Gengler-Dahl) is an American rower. She competed at the 1988 Summer Olympics and the 1992 Summer Olympics.
