= Teodora Zareva =

Bulgarian rower

Personal information
- Full name: Teodora Ivanova Zareva
- Nationality: Bulgarian
- Born: 10 December 1963 (age 62) Sofia, Bulgaria

Sport
- Sport: Rowing
Medal record
Representing Bulgaria
Summer Universiade
Gold medal – first place	1987 Zagreb	Coxless pairs

Teodora Ivanova Zareva (Bulgarian: Теодора Иванова Зарева; born 10 December 1963) is a Bulgarian rower. She competed at the 1988 Summer Olympics and the 1992 Summer Olympics.

Her sister Violeta Zareva is also an Olympic rower.
