= Judo at the 1992 Summer Olympics – Men's 78 kg =

Judo competition

Men's 78 kg at the Games of the XXV Olympiad
- Venue: Palau Blaugrana
- Date: 30 July 1992
- Competitors: 42 from 42 nations

Medalists
1st place, gold medalist(s)		Hidehiko Yoshida	Japan
2nd place, silver medalist(s)		Jason Morris	United States
3rd place, bronze medalist(s)		Bertrand Damaisin	France
3rd place, bronze medalist(s)		Kim Byung-joo	South Korea

The men's 78 kg competition in judo at the 1992 Summer Olympics in Barcelona was held on 30 July at the Palau Blaugrana. The gold medal was won by Hidehiko Yoshida of Japan.

== Results ==
=== Main brackets ===
==== Pool A ====
Round of 64
Patrick Matangi (ZIM)	YUK
Sekou Camara (GUI)	E
Daniel Lascau (GER)	E
Kim Byung-joo (KOR)	YUK
Davaasambuugiin Dorjbat (MGL)	IPO
Freyr Gauti Sigmundsson (ISL)	E
Moshe Pennavayre (CIV)	E
João de Souza (ANG)	YUS
Graeme Spinks (NZL)	IPO
Marko Haanpää (FIN)	E

Round of 32
Patrick Matangi (ZIM)	E
Ezequiel Paraguassu (BRA)	IPO
Kim Byung-joo (KOR)	YUK
Jean Alix Holmand (HAI)	E
Davaasambuugiin Dorjbat (MGL)	IPO
Ahmed Al-Shiekh (YEM)	E
Lars Adolfsson (SWE)	IPO
Suleman Musa (NGR)	RA
João de Souza (ANG)	E
Anthonie Wurth (NED)	IPO
Eric Bustos (BOL)	E
Khristodoulos Katsinioridis (CYP)	IPO
Graeme Spinks (NZL)	E
Sharip Varayev (EUN)	IPO
Jason Morris (USA)	IPO
M'Bairo Abakar (CHA)	RA

Round of 16
Ezequiel Paraguassu (BRA)	E
Kim Byung-joo (KOR)	IPO
Davaasambuugiin Dorjbat (MGL)	RA
Lars Adolfsson (SWE)	IPO
Anthonie Wurth (NED)	IPO
Khristodoulos Katsinioridis (CYP)	E
Sharip Varayev (EUN)	RA
Jason Morris (USA)	YUK

Quarterfinal
Kim Byung-joo (KOR)	RA
Lars Adolfsson (SWE)	YUK
Anthonie Wurth (NED)	RA
Jason Morris (USA)	YUK

Semifinal
Lars Adolfsson (SWE)	RB
Jason Morris (USA)	IPO

==== Pool B ====
Round of 64
Zsolt Zsoldos (HUN)	SOG
Musuyu Kutama (COD)	E
Nacanieli Takayawa-Qerawaqa (FIJ)	E
Olivier Schaffter (SUI)	WIP
Amadou Guèye (SEN)	E
Abdul Kader Dabo (MLI)	KOK
Hidehiko Yoshida (JPN)	IPO
Hamid Fadul (SUD)	RB
Yahia Gregni (LBA)	E
Jean-Jacques Rakotomalala (MAD)	IPO

Round of 32
Zsolt Zsoldos (HUN)	YUS
Salah Rekik (TUN)	E
Ryan Birch (GBR)	RB
Johan Laats (BEL)	YUS
Olivier Schaffter (SUI)	E
Bertrand Damaisin (FRA)	KEI
Anton Summer (AUT)	WIP
António Matias (POR)	E
Abdul Kader Dabo (MLI)	E
Alexandru Ciupe (ROU)	IPO
John Baylon (PHI)	E
Krzysztof Kamiński (POL)	IPO
Hidehiko Yoshida (JPN)	IPO
Fadi Saikali (LIB)	RB
Jean-Jacques Rakotomalala (MAD)	E
Gastón García (ARG)	IPO

Round of 16
Zsolt Zsoldos (HUN)	RB
Johan Laats (BEL)	WIP
Bertrand Damaisin (FRA)	IPO
Anton Summer (AUT)	E
Alexandru Ciupe (ROU)	IPO
Krzysztof Kamiński (POL)	E
Hidehiko Yoshida (JPN)	IPO
Gastón García (ARG)	RB

Quarterfinal
Johan Laats (BEL)	IPO
Bertrand Damaisin (FRA)	RB
Alexandru Ciupe (ROU)	RB
Hidehiko Yoshida (JPN)	IPO

Semifinal
Johan Laats (BEL)	RA
Hidehiko Yoshida (JPN)	IPO

=== Repechages ===
==== Repechage A ====
Repechage round 1

Repechage round 2
Suleman Musa (NGR)	E
Davaasambuugiin Dorjbat (MGL)	IPO
M'Bairo Abakar (CHA)	E
Sharip Varayev (EUN)	IPO

Repechage quarterfinal
Davaasambuugiin Dorjbat (MGL)	E
Kim Byung-joo (KOR)	IPO
Sharip Varayev (EUN)	IPO
Anthonie Wurth (NED)	E

Repechage semifinal
Kim Byung-joo (KOR)	KEI
Sharip Varayev (EUN)	E

Repechage final
Kim Byung-joo (KOR)	WAZ (bronze)
Johan Laats (BEL)	E

==== Repechage B ====
Repechage round 1
Hamid Fadul (SUD)	E
Fadi Saikali (LIB)	IPO

Repechage round 2
Ryan Birch (GBR)	E
Zsolt Zsoldos (HUN)	IPO
Fadi Saikali (LIB)	FUS
Gastón García (ARG)	E

Repechage quarterfinal
Zsolt Zsoldos (HUN)	E
Bertrand Damaisin (FRA)	IPO
Fadi Saikali (LIB)	E
Alexandru Ciupe (ROU)	IPO

Repechage semifinal
Bertrand Damaisin (FRA)	CHU
Alexandru Ciupe (ROU)	E

Repechage final
Bertrand Damaisin (FRA)	WIP (bronze)
Lars Adolfsson (SWE)	E

=== Final ===
Final
Jason Morris (USA)	2nd place, silver medalist(s)
Hidehiko Yoshida (JPN)	KOK (gold)

== Final classification ==
Rank	Judoka	Nation
1st place, gold medalist(s)	Hidehiko Yoshida	Japan
2nd place, silver medalist(s)	Jason Morris	United States
3rd place, bronze medalist(s)	Bertrand Damaisin	France
3rd place, bronze medalist(s)	Kim Byung-joo	South Korea
5T	Johan Laats	Belgium
5T	Lars Adolfsson	Sweden
7T	Alexandru Ciupe	Romania
7T	Sharip Varayev	Unified Team
9T	Davaasambuugiin Dorjbat	Mongolia
9T	Anthonie Wurth	Netherlands
9T	Zsolt Zsoldos	Hungary
9T	Fadi Saikali	Lebanon
13T	Suleman Musa	Nigeria
13T	M'Bairo Abakar	Chad
13T	Ryan Birch	Great Britain
13T	Gastón García	Argentina
17T	Hamid Fadul	Sudan
18T	Ezequiel Paraguassu	Brazil
18T	Khristodoulos Katsinioridis	Cyprus
18T	Anton Summer	Austria
18T	Krzysztof Kamiński	Poland
22T	Patrick Matangi	Zimbabwe
22T	Jean Alix Holmand	Haiti
22T	Ahmed Al-Shiekh	Yemen
22T	Graeme Spinks	New Zealand
22T	João de Souza	Angola
22T	Eric Bustos	Bolivia
22T	Salah Rekik	Tunisia
22T	Jean-Jacques Rakotomalala	Madagascar
22T	Olivier Schaffter	Switzerland
22T	António Matias	Portugal
22T	Abdul Kader Dabo	Mali
22T	John Baylon	Philippines
34T	Sekou Camara	Guinea
34T	Daniel Lascau	Germany
34T	Freyr Gauti Sigmundsson	Iceland
34T	Moshe Pennavayre	Ivory Coast
34T	Marko Haanpää	Finland
34T	Musuyu Kutama	Zaire
34T	Nacanieli Takayawa-Qerawaqa	Fiji
34T	Amadou Guèye	Senegal
34T	Yahia Gregni	Libya
