= United States at the 1992 Summer Olympics =

- Flag of the United States
- IOC code: USA
- NOC: United States Olympic Committee

in Barcelona, Catalonia, Spain July 25–August 9, 1992
- Competitors: 545 (355 men, 190 women) in 28 sports
- Flag bearers: Francie Larrieu Smith (opening); Peter Westbrook (closing)
- Medals Ranked 2nd: Gold 37 Silver 34 Bronze 37 Total 108

Summer Olympics appearances (overview)
- 1896; 1900; 1904; 1908; 1912; 1920; 1924; 1928; 1932; 1936; 1948; 1952; 1956; 1960; 1964; 1968; 1972; 1976; 1980; 1984; 1988; 1992; 1996; 2000; 2004; 2008; 2012; 2016; 2020; 2024; 2028

Other related appearances
- 1906 Intercalated Games

The United States of America (USA) competed at the 1992 Summer Olympics in Barcelona, Spain. 545 competitors, 355 men and 190 women, took part in 248 events in 28 sports. At the closing ceremony, a segment of American culture was performed, as the country hosted the next Olympics in Atlanta.

The team finished second in the overall medal rankings, narrowly losing to the Unified Team, 108 to 112. The Unified Team was basically a Soviet team competing under a different name, as the USSR collapsed several months prior to the Games. The Americans greatly improved compared to the 1988 Olympics mainly due to the break-up of the Eastern Bloc and its doping system.

== Medalists ==
The following U.S. competitors won medals at the games. In the discipline sections below, the medalists' names are bolded.

Medal	Name	Sport	Event	Date
Gold	Nelson Diebel	Swimming	Men's 100 meter breaststroke	July 26
Gold	Pablo Morales	Swimming	Men's 100 meter butterfly	July 27
Gold	Nicole Haislett	Swimming	Women's 200 meter freestyle	July 27
Gold	Crissy Ahmann-Leighton^{[a]} Nicole Haislett; Angel Martino; Ashley Tappin^{[a]} Jenny Thompson; Dara Torres	Swimming	Women's 4 × 100 meter freestyle relay	July 28
Gold	Mark Lenzi	Diving	Men's 3 meter springboard	July 29
Gold	Mike Barrowman	Swimming	Men's 200 meter breaststroke	July 29
Gold	Matt Biondi; Joe Hudepohl; Tom Jager; Shaun Jordan^{[a]} Jon Olsen; Joel Thomas^{[a]}	Swimming	Men's 4 × 100 meter freestyle relay	July 29
Gold	Launi Meili	Shooting	Women's 50 meter rifle three position	July 30
Gold	Melvin Stewart	Swimming	Men's 200 meter butterfly	July 30
Gold	Janet Evans	Swimming	Women's 800 meter freestyle	July 30
Gold	Crissy Ahmann-Leighton; Nicole Haislett^{[a]} Megan Kleine^{[a]} Lea Loveless; Anita Nall; Summer Sanders^{[a]} Jenny Thompson; Janie Wagstaff^{[a]}	Swimming	Women's 4 × 100 meter medley relay	July 30
Gold	Mike Stulce	Athletics	Men's shot put	July 31
Gold	David Berkoff^{[a]} Matt Biondi^{[a]} Hans Dersch^{[a]} Nelson Diebel; Pablo Morales; Jon Olsen; Jeff Rouse; Melvin Stewart^{[a]}	Swimming	Men's 4 × 100 meter medley relay	July 31
Gold	Summer Sanders	Swimming	Women's 200 meter butterfly	July 31
Gold	Gail Devers	Athletics	Women's 100 meters	August 1
Gold	Jackie Joyner-Kersee	Athletics	Women's Heptathlon	August 2
Gold	Joe Jacobi; Scott Strausbaugh	Canoeing	Slalom C-2	August 2
Gold	Trent Dimas	Gymnastics	Horizontal bar	August 2
Gold	Mike Conley	Athletics	Men's triple jump	August 3
Gold	Hal Haenel; Mark Reynolds	Sailing	Star	August 3
Gold	Quincy Watts	Athletics	Men's 400 meters	August 5
Gold	Karen Josephson; Sarah Josephson	Synchronized swimming	Duet	August 5
Gold	Michael Marsh	Athletics	Men's 200 meters	August 6
Gold	Kevin Young	Athletics	Men's 400 meter hurdles	August 6
Gold	Carl Lewis	Athletics	Men's long jump	August 6
Gold	Gwen Torrence	Athletics	Women's 200 meters	August 6
Gold	Kristen Babb-Sprague	Synchronized swimming	Solo	August 6
Gold	Bruce Baumgartner	wrestling	Freestyle –130 kilogram	August 6
Gold	Jennifer Capriati	Tennis	Women's singles	August 7
Gold	John Smith	wrestling	Freestyle –62 kilogram	August 7
Gold	Kevin Jackson	wrestling	Freestyle –82 kilogram	August 7
Gold	Leroy Burrell; James Jett^{[a]} Carl Lewis; Michael Marsh; Dennis Mitchell	Athletics	Men's 4 × 100 meter relay	August 8
Gold	Darnell Hall^{[a]} Charles Jenkins^{[a]} Michael Johnson; Steve Lewis; Andrew Valmon; Quincy Watts	Athletics	Men's 4 × 400 meter relay	August 8
Gold	Evelyn Ashford; Michelle Finn^{[a]} Carlette Guidry; Esther Jones; Gwen Torrence	Athletics	Women's 4 × 100 meter relay	August 8
Gold	United States men's national basketball team: Charles Barkley; Larry Bird; Clyde Drexler; Patrick Ewing; Earvin Johnson; Michael Jordan; Christian Laettner; Karl Malone; Chris Mullin; Scottie Pippen; David Robinson; John Stockton	Basketball	Men's tournament	August 8
Gold	Oscar De La Hoya	Boxing	Lightweight	August 8
Gold	Gigi Fernández; Mary Joe Fernández	Tennis	Women's doubles	August 8
Silver	Jenny Thompson	Swimming	Women's 100 meter freestyle	July 26
Silver	Eric Namesnik	Swimming	Men's 400 meter individual medley	July 27
Silver	Janet Evans	Swimming	Women's 400 meter freestyle	July 28
Silver	Dennis Koslowski	wrestling	Greco-Roman –100 kilogram	July 28
Silver	Anita Nall	Swimming	Women's 100 meter breaststroke	July 29
Silver	Crissy Ahmann-Leighton	Swimming	Women's 100 meter butterfly	July 29
Silver	Shannon Miller	Gymnastics	Women's individual all-around	July 30
Silver	Jason Morris	Judo	Men's –78 kilogram	July 30
Silver	Matt Biondi	Swimming	Men's 50 meter freestyle	July 30
Silver	Jeff Rouse	Swimming	Men's 100 meter backstroke	July 30
Silver	Summer Sanders	Swimming	Women's 200 meter individual medley	July 30
Silver	Jim Doehring	Athletics	Men's shot put	July 31
Silver	Robert Foth	Shooting	Men's 50 meter rifle three position	July 31
Silver	Gregory Burgess	Swimming	Men's 200 meter individual medley	July 31
Silver	Shannon Miller	Gymnastics	Balance beam	August 1
Silver	Shelagh Donohoe; Cynthia Eckert; Carol Feeney; Amy Fuller	Rowing	Women's four	August 1
Silver	Thomas Bohrer; William Burden; Patrick Manning; Jeffrey McLaughlin	Rowing	Men's coxless four	August 2
Silver	Mike Gebhardt	Sailing	Men's Lechner A-390	August 2
Silver	Tony Dees	Athletics	Men's 110 meter hurdles	August 3
Silver	Charles Simpkins	Athletics	Men's triple jump	August 3
Silver	Scott Donie	Diving	Men's 10 meter platform	August 3
Silver	Kevin Burnham; Morgan Reeser	Sailing	Men's 470	August 3
Silver	Brian Ledbetter	Sailing	Finn	August 3
Silver	Stephen Bourdow; Paul Foerster	Sailing	Flying Dutchman	August 3
Silver	Keith Notary; Randy Smyth	Sailing	Tornado	August 3
Silver	Jim Brady; Doug Kern; Kevin Mahaney	Sailing	Soling	August 4
Silver	Steve Lewis	Athletics	Men's 400 meters	August 5
Silver	Sandra Farmer-Patrick	Athletics	Women's 400 meter hurdles	August 5
Silver	Zeke Jones	wrestling	Freestyle –52 kilogram	August 5
Silver	Mike Powell	Athletics	Men's long jump	August 6
Silver	LaVonna Martin	Athletics	Women's 100 meter hurdles	August 6
Silver	Kenny Monday	wrestling	Freestyle –74 kilogram	August 6
Silver	Denean Hill^{[a]} Natasha Kaiser; Jearl Miles; Rochelle Stevens; Gwen Torrence; Dannette Young^{[a]}	Athletics	Women's 4 × 400 meter relay	August 8
Silver	Chris Byrd	Boxing	Middleweight	August 8
Bronze	Summer Sanders	Swimming	Women's 400 meter individual medley	July 26
Bronze	Erin Hartwell	Cycling	Men's 1 kilometer time trial	July 27
Bronze	Mary Ellen Clark	Diving	Women's 10 meter platform	July 27
Bronze	Doug Gjertsen; Joe Hudepohl; Scott Jaffe^{[a]} Dan Jorgensen^{[a]} Jon Olsen; Melvin Stewart	Swimming	Men's 4 ×200 meter freestyle relay	July 27
Bronze	Anita Nall	Swimming	Women's 200 meter breaststroke	July 27
Bronze	Wendy Bruce; Dominique Dawes; Shannon Miller; Betty Okino; Kerri Strug; Kim Zmeskal	Gymnastics	Women's team all-around	July 28
Bronze	Lea Loveless	Swimming	Women's 100 meter backstroke	July 28
Bronze	Tom Jager	Swimming	Men's 50 meter freestyle	July 30
Bronze	David Berkoff	Swimming	Men's 100 meter backstroke	July 30
Bronze	Rodney Smith	wrestling	Greco-Roman –68 kilogram	July 30
Bronze	Rebecca Twigg	Cycling	Women's individual pursuit	July 31
Bronze	Angel Martino	Swimming	Women's 50 meter freestyle	July 31
Bronze	Dennis Mitchell	Athletics	Men's 100 meters	August 1
Bronze	Dana Chladek	Canoeing	Women's slalom K-1	August 1
Bronze	Shannon Miller	Gymnastics	Women's floor exercise	August 1
Bronze	Shannon Miller	Gymnastics	Uneven bars	August 1
Bronze	Stephanie Maxwell-Pierson; Anna Seaton	Rowing	Women's pair	August 1
Bronze	Hollis Conway	Athletics	Men's high jump	August 2
Bronze	Charlotte Bredahl; Robert Dover; Carol Lavell; Michael Poulin	Equestrian	Team dressage	August 2
Bronze	Jack Pierce	Athletics	Men's 110 meter hurdles	August 3
Bronze	Dave Johnson	Athletics	Men's Decathlon	August 3
Bronze	Pamela Healy; J. J. Isler	Sailing	Women's 470	August 4
Bronze	Julia Trotman	Sailing	Europe	August 4
Bronze	Johnny Gray	Athletics	Men's 800 meters	August 5
Bronze	Janeene Vickers	Athletics	Women's 400 meter hurdles	August 5
Bronze	Michael Bates	Athletics	Men's 200 meters	August 6
Bronze	Joe Greene	Athletics	Men's long jump	August 6
Bronze	Lynn Jennings	Athletics	Women's 10,000 meters	August 7
Bronze	Jackie Joyner-Kersee	Athletics	Women's long jump	August 7
Bronze	United States women's national basketball team: Vicky Bullett; Daedra Charles; Cynthia Cooper; Clarissa Davis; Medina Dixon; Teresa Edwards; Tammy Jackson; Carolyn Jones-Young; Katrina McClain; Suzanne McConnell; Vickie Orr; Teresa Weatherspoon	Basketball	Women's tournament	August 7
Bronze	Mary Joe Fernández	Tennis	Women's singles	August 7
Bronze	Christopher Campbell	wrestling	Freestyle –90 kilogram	August 7
Bronze	Greg Barton	Canoeing	Men's K-1 1000 meters	August 8
Bronze	United States women's national volleyball team: Janet Cobbs; Tara Cross-Battle; Lori Endicott; Caren Kemner; Ruth Lawanson; Tammy Liley; Elaina Oden; Kim Oden; Teee Sanders; Liane Sato; Paula Weishoff; Yoko Zetterlund	Volleyball	Women's tournament	August 8
Bronze	Timothy Austin	Boxing	Flyweight	August 9
Bronze	Norman Dello Joio	Equestrian	Individual jumping	August 9
Bronze	United States men's national volleyball team: Nick Becker; Carlos Briceno; Bob Ctvrtlik; Scott Fortune; Daniel Greenbaum; Brent Hilliard; Bryan Ivie; Douglas Partie; Robert Samuelson; Eric Sato; Jeff Stork; Stephen Timmons	Volleyball	Men's tournament	August 9

Medals by sport
Sport	1st place, gold medalist(s)	2nd place, silver medalist(s)	3rd place, bronze medalist(s)	Total
Athletics	12	8	10	**30**
Swimming	11	9	7	**27**
wrestling	3	3	2	**8**
Tennis	2	0	1	**3**
Synchronized swimming	2	0	0	**2**
Sailing	1	6	2	**9**
Gymnastics	1	2	3	**6**
Boxing	1	1	1	**3**
Diving	1	1	1	**3**
Shooting	1	1	0	**2**
Canoeing	1	0	2	**3**
Basketball	1	0	1	**2**
Rowing	0	2	1	**3**
Judo	0	1	0	**1**
Cycling	0	0	2	**2**
Equestrian	0	0	2	**2**
Volleyball	0	0	2	**2**
Total	37	34	37	108

Medals by day
Day	Date	1st place, gold medalist(s)	2nd place, silver medalist(s)	3rd place, bronze medalist(s)	Total
1	July 26	1	1	1	**3**
2	July 27	2	1	4	**7**
3	July 28	1	2	2	**5**
4	July 29	3	2	0	**5**
5	July 30	4	5	3	**12**
6	July 31	3	3	2	**8**
7	August 1	1	2	5	**8**
8	August 2	3	2	2	**7**
9	August 3	2	7	2	**11**
10	August 4	0	1	2	**3**
11	August 5	2	3	2	**7**
12	August 6	6	3	2	**11**
13	August 7	3	0	5	**8**
14	August 8	6	2	2	**10**
15	August 9	0	0	3	**3**
Total		37	34	37	108

Medals by gender
Gender	1st place, gold medalist(s)	2nd place, silver medalist(s)	3rd place, bronze medalist(s)	Total	Percentage
Male	23	23	17	**63**	58.3%
Female	14	11	19	**44**	40.7%
Mixed	0	0	1	**1**	1.0%
Total	37	34	37	108	100%

Multiple medalists
Name	Sport	1st place, gold medalist(s)	2nd place, silver medalist(s)	3rd place, bronze medalist(s)	Total
Shannon Miller	Gymnastics	0	2	3	**5**
Summer Sanders	Swimming	2	1	1	**4**
Nicole Haislett	Swimming	3	0	0	**3**
Crissy Ahmann-Leighton	Swimming	2	1	0	**3**
Matt Biondi	Swimming	2	1	0	**3**
Jenny Thompson	Swimming	2	1	0	**3**
Gwen Torrence	Athletics	2	1	0	**3**
Jon Olsen	Swimming	2	0	1	**3**
Melvin Stewart	Swimming	2	0	1	**3**
Anita Nall	Swimming	1	1	1	**3**
Nelson Diebel	Swimming	2	0	0	**2**
Carl Lewis	Athletics	2	0	0	**2**
Michael Marsh	Athletics	2	0	0	**2**
Pablo Morales	Swimming	2	0	0	**2**
Quincy Watts	Athletics	2	0	0	**2**
Janet Evans	Swimming	1	1	0	**2**
Steve Lewis	Athletics	1	1	0	**2**
Jeff Rouse	Swimming	1	1	0	**2**
David Berkoff	Swimming	1	0	1	**2**
Mary Joe Fernández	Tennis	1	0	1	**2**
Joe Hudepohl	Swimming	1	0	1	**2**
Tom Jager	Swimming	1	0	1	**2**
Jackie Joyner-Kersee	Athletics	1	0	1	**2**
Lea Loveless	Swimming	1	0	1	**2**
Angel Martino	Swimming	1	0	1	**2**
Dennis Mitchell	Athletics	1	0	1	**2**

^{a} - Indicates that the athlete competed in preliminaries but not the final.

== Competitors ==
The following is the list of number of competitors in the Games.

Sport	Men	Women	Total
Archery	3	3	6
Athletics	68	49	117
Badminton	3	3	6
Baseball	20	–	20
Basketball	12	12	24
Boxing	12	–	12
Canoeing	25	7	32
Cycling	15	5	20
Diving	4	4	8
Equestrian	7	5	12
Fencing	11	5	16
Football	17	–	17
Gymnastics	6	8	14
Handball	0	13	13
Judo	7	6	13
Modern pentathlon	3	–	3
Rowing	30	22	52
Sailing	13	4	17
Shooting	14	7	21
Swimming	25	15	40
Synchronized swimming	–	3	3
Table tennis	2	3	5
Tennis	3	4	7
Volleyball	12	12	24
Water polo	13	–	13
Weightlifting	10	–	10
Wrestling	20	–	20
Total	355	190	565

== Archery ==
The United States won no medals in archery. Two individuals made it to the quarterfinals, as did both of the teams, but all were defeated there. The six archers combined for a 5–5 record in individual matches and a 2–2 record in team matches.

Men

Athlete	Event	Ranking round		Round of 32	Round of 16	Quarterfinal	Semifinal	Final / BM	
Athlete	Event	Score	Rank	Opposition Result	Opposition Result	Opposition Result	Opposition Result	Opposition Result	Rank
Jay Barrs	Individual	1304	12 Q	Poikolainen (FIN); W 106–100	Vertesgen (NED); W 106–104	Terry (GBR); L 108–108	Did not advance		5
Richard Johnson	Individual	1276	30 Q	Han (KOR); L 106–107	Did not advance				18
Richard McKinney	Individual	1260	40	Did not advance					40
Jay Barrs; Richard Johnson; Richard McKinney	Team	3840	4 Q	—N/a	Japan; W 243–225	Finland; L 237–239	Did not advance		6

Women

Athlete	Event	Ranking round		Round of 32	Round of 16	Quarterfinal	Semifinal	Final / BM	
Athlete	Event	Score	Rank	Opposition Result	Opposition Result	Opposition Result	Opposition Result	Opposition Result	Rank
Sherry Block	Individual	1271	29 Q	Valeeva (EUN); L 99–101	Did not advance				25
Jennifer O'Donnell	Individual	1295	20 Q	Arzhannikova (EUN); W 101–97	Valeeva (EUN); L 105–112	Did not advance			11
Denise Parker	Individual	1333	5 Q	Öktem (TUR); W 108–95	Nasaridze (TUR); W 105–100	Valleva (EUN); L 105–107	Did not advance		5
Sherry Block; Jennifer O'Donnell; Denise Parker	Team	2899	4 Q	—N/a	Hungary; W 235–222	France; L 225–234	Did not advance		8

== Athletics ==
Key

- Note–Ranks given for track events are within the athlete's heat only
- Q = Qualified for the next round
- q = Qualified for the next round as a fastest loser or, in field events, by position without achieving the qualifying target

Men
Track and road events

Athlete	Event	Heat		Quarterfinal		Semifinal		Final	
Athlete	Event	Time	Rank	Time	Rank	Time	Rank	Time	Rank
Leroy Burrell	100 m	10.21	1 Q	10.08	2 Q	9.97	1 Q	10.10	5
Dennis Mitchell	100 m	10.21	1 Q	10.22	1 Q	10.10	3 Q	10.04	3rd place, bronze medalist(s)
Mark Witherspoon	100 m	10.27	2 Q	10.19	1 Q	DNF		Did not advance	
Michael Bates	200 m	20.91	1 Q	20.22	1 Q	20.39	2 Q	20.38	3rd place, bronze medalist(s)
Michael Johnson	200 m	20.80	1 Q	20.55	2 Q	20.78	6	Did not advance	
Mike Marsh	200 m	20.38	1 Q	20.08	1 Q	19.73	1 Q	20.01	1st place, gold medalist(s)
Danny Everett	400 m	45.68	1 Q	45.76	4 Q	56.61	8	Did not advance	
Steve Lewis	400 m	45.14	1 Q	44.54	1 Q	44.50	1 Q	44.21	2nd place, silver medalist(s)
Quincy Watts	400 m	45.38	1 Q	45.06	2 Q	43.71 OR	1 Q	43.50 OR	1st place, gold medalist(s)
Mark Everett	800 m	1:48.65	2 Q	—N/a		1:46.94	2 Q	DNF	
Johnny Gray	800 m	1:46.62	1 Q	—N/a		1:45.66	1 Q	1:43.97	3rd place, bronze medalist(s)
José Parrilla	800 m	1:48.17	4	—N/a		Did not advance			
Terrance Herrington	1500 m	3:44.80	6	—N/a		Did not advance			
Steve Holman	1500 m	3:38.38	2 Q	—N/a		3:40.49	9	Did not advance	
Jim Spivey	1500 m	3:38.01	3 Q	—N/a		3:35.55	4 Q	3:41.74	8
Bob Kennedy	5000 m	13:35.76	2 Q	—N/a				13:39.72	12
Reuben Reina	5000 m	13:40.50	5	—N/a				Did not advance	
John Trautmann	5000 m	DNF		—N/a				Did not advance	
Steve Plasencia	10,000 m	28:45.59	13	—N/a				Did not advance	
Aaron Ramirez	10,000 m	29:00.12	13	—N/a				Did not advance	
Todd Williams	10,000 m	28:26.32	5 Q	—N/a				28:29.38	10
Arthur Blake	110 m hurdles	13.45	3 Q	13.50	4 Q	DSQ		Did not advance	
Tony Dees	110 m hurdles	13.38	1 Q	13.31	1 Q	13.31	3 Q	13.24	2nd place, silver medalist(s)
Jack Pierce	110 m hurdles	13.47	1 Q	13.17	1 Q	13.21	1 Q	13.26	3rd place, bronze medalist(s)
McClinton Neal	400 m hurdles	49.13	1 Q	—N/a		48.71	5	Did not advance	
David Patrick	400 m hurdles	49.56	2 Q	—N/a		48.47	4 Q	49.26	8
Kevin Young	400 m hurdles	48.76	1 Q	—N/a		47.63	2 Q	46.78 WR	1st place, gold medalist(s)
Mark Croghan	3000 m steeplechase	8:28.15	4 Q	—N/a		8:30.15	7	Did not advance	
Brian Diemer	3000 m steeplechase	8:28.88	2 Q	—N/a		8:23.30	3 Q	8:18.77	7
Daniel Lopez	3000 m steeplechase	8:29.01	7 q	—N/a		8:41.28	11	Did not advance	
Leroy Burrell; James Jett^{[b]} Carl Lewis; Mike Marsh; Dennis Mitchell	4 × 100 m relay	38.95	2 Q	—N/a		38.14	1 Q	37.40 WR	1st place, gold medalist(s)
Darnell Hall^{[b]} Charles Jenkins Jr.^{[b]} Michael Johnson; Steve Lewis; Andrew Valmon; Quincy Watts	4 × 400 m relay	2:59.14	2 Q	—N/a				2:55.74 WR	1st place, gold medalist(s)
Ed Eyestone	Marathon	—N/a						2:15:23	13
Bob Kempainen	Marathon	—N/a						2:15:53	17
Steve Spence	Marathon	—N/a						2:15:21	12
Allen James	20 km walk	—N/a						1:35:12	30
Marco Evoniuk	50 km walk	—N/a						DNF	
Herm Nelson	50 km walk	—N/a						4:25:49	32
Carl Schueler	50 km walk	—N/a						4:13:38	23

Field events

Athlete	Event	Qualification		Final	
Athlete	Event	Result	Rank	Result	Rank
Joe Greene	Long jump	7.90	12 Q	8.34	3rd place, bronze medalist(s)
Carl Lewis	Long jump	8.68	1 Q	8.67	1st place, gold medalist(s)
Mike Powell	Long jump	8.14	4 Q	8.64	2nd place, silver medalist(s)
Mike Conley	Triple jump	17.23	3 Q	18.17	1st place, gold medalist(s)
Charles Simpkins	Triple jump	17.05	8 q	17.60	2nd place, silver medalist(s)
John Tillman	Triple jump	16.22	25	Did not advance	
Charles Austin	High jump	2.26	=3 Q	2.28	=8
Hollis Conway	High jump	2.26	=3 Q	2.34	3rd place, bronze medalist(s)
Darrin Plab	High jump	2.23	=15	Did not advance	
Tim Bright	Pole vault	5.60	4 Q	NM	
Kory Tarpenning	Pole vault	5.60	5 Q	5.75	4
David Volz	Pole vault	5.55	11 q	5.65	5
Ron Backes	Shot put	19.71	11 Q	19.75	10
Jim Doehring	Shot put	20.53	1 Q	20.96	2nd place, silver medalist(s)
Mike Stulce	Shot put	20.18	6 Q	21.70	1st place, gold medalist(s)
Brian Blutreich	Discus throw	57.08	25	Did not advance	
Mike Buncic	Discus throw	59.12	18	Did not advance	
Anthony Washington	Discus throw	62.18	6 Q	59.96	12
Michael Barnett	Javelin throw	79.14	12 q	78.64	7
Brian Crouser	Javelin throw	74.98	21	Did not advance	
Tom Pukstys	Javelin throw	81.16	2 Q	76.72	10
Lance Deal	Hammer throw	77.00	4 Q	76.84	7
Kenneth Flax	Hammer throw	69.36	23	Did not advance	
Jud Logan	Hammer throw	DSQ			

Combined events – Decathlon

Athlete	Event	100 m	LJ	SP	HJ	400 m	110H	DT	PV	JT	1500 m	Points	Rank
Dave Johnson	Result	11.16	7.33	15.28	2.00	49.76	14.76	49.12	5.10	62.86	4:36.63	8309	3rd place, bronze medalist(s)
Dave Johnson	Points	825	893	807	803	826	879	852	941	781	702	8309	3rd place, bronze medalist(s)
Aric Long	Result	11.25	7.21	14.00	2.18	49.93	DSQ	45.76	DNS			DNF	
Aric Long	Points	806	864	728	973	818	0	783	DNS			DNF	
Rob Muzzio	Result	11.36	6.94	16.02	2.00	50.00	14.75	50.74	4.90	61.64	4:31.52	8195	5
Rob Muzzio	Points	782	799	852	803	815	880	886	880	763	705	8195	5

Women
Track and road events

Athlete	Event	Heat		Quarterfinal		Semifinal		Final	
Athlete	Event	Time	Rank	Time	Rank	Time	Rank	Time	Rank
Evelyn Ashford	100 m	11.23	1 Q	11.13	1 Q	11.29	5	Did not advance	
Gail Devers	100 m	11.23	1 Q	11.17	2 Q	11.12	2 Q	10.82	1st place, gold medalist(s)
Gwen Torrence	100 m	11.28	1 Q	11.17	2 Q	11.02	1 Q	10.86	4
Michelle Finn	200 m	23.00	2 Q	22.42	2 Q	22.39	4 Q	22.61	7
Carlette Guidry	200 m	22.99	1 Q	22.26	2 Q	22.31	2 Q	22.30	5
Gwen Torrence	200 m	22.66	1 Q	22.21	1 Q	21.72	1 Q	21.81	1st place, gold medalist(s)
Natasha Kaiser	400 m	51.41	1 Q	50.71	3 Q	50.60	6	Did not advance	
Jearl Miles	400 m	52.79	2 Q	51.27	2 Q	50.57	5	Did not advance	
Rochelle Stevens	400 m	52.42	1 Q	50.70	1 Q	50.37	4 Q	50.11	6
Joetta Clark	800 m	1:59.62	1 Q	—N/a		1:59.62	4 Q	1:58.06	7
Julie Jenkins	800 m	1:59.96	3 q	—N/a		2:06.53	8	Did not advance	
Meredith Rainey	800 m	2:01.33	3	—N/a		Did not advance			
Suzy Favor	1500 m	4:22.36	11	—N/a		Did not advance			
Regina Jacobs	1500 m	4:13.87	7 Q	—N/a		4:21.55	10	Did not advance	
PattiSue Plumer	1500 m	4:09.47	10 q	—N/a		4:04.23	6 q	4:03.42	10
Annette Peters	3000 m	8:52.77	4	—N/a				Did not advance	
PattiSue Plumer	3000 m	8:47.58	3 Q	—N/a				8:48.29	5
Shelly Steely	3000 m	8:44.22	6 q	—N/a				8:52.67	7
Gwynneth Coogan	10,000 m	33:13.13	13	—N/a				Did not advance	
Lynn Jennings	10,000 m	32:18.06	3 Q	—N/a				31:19.89	3rd place, bronze medalist(s)
Judi St. Hilaire	10,000 m	32:13.99	7 Q	—N/a				31:38.04	8
Gail Devers	100 m hurdles	13.19	3 Q	12.76	1 Q	12.14	2 Q	12.75	5
LaVonna Martin	100 m hurdles	12.82	1 Q	12.82	1 Q	12.81	1 Q	12.69	2nd place, silver medalist(s)
Lynda Tolbert	100 m hurdles	12.96	1 Q	12.96	2 Q	13.10	1 Q	12.75	4
Tonja Buford	400 m hurdles	56.35	3 Q	—N/a		55.04	6	Did not advance	
Sandra Farmer-Patrick	400 m hurdles	55.12	1 Q	—N/a		53.90	1 Q	53.69	2nd place, silver medalist(s)
Janeene Vickers	400 m hurdles	55.24	1 Q	—N/a		54.67	3 Q	54.31	3rd place, bronze medalist(s)
Evelyn Ashford; Michelle Finn^{[b]} Carlette Guidry; Esther Jones; Gwen Torrence	4 × 100 m relay	42.50	2 Q	—N/a				42.11	1st place, gold medalist(s)
Denean Howard^{[b]} Natasha Kaiser; Jearl Miles; Rochelle Stevens; Gwen Torrence; Dannette Young^{[b]}	4 × 400 m relay	3:22.29	1 Q	—N/a				3:20.92	2nd place, silver medalist(s)
Janis Klecker	Marathon	—N/a						2:47:17	21
Francie Larrieu Smith	Marathon	—N/a						2:41:09	12
Cathy O'Brien	Marathon	—N/a						2:39:42	10
Victoria Herazo	10 km walk	—N/a						48:26	27
Debbi Lawrence	10 km walk	—N/a						48:23	26
Michelle Rohl	10 km walk	—N/a						46:45	20

^{b} - Athlete ran in the heat but not the final.

Field events

Athlete	Event	Qualification		Final	
Athlete	Event	Result	Rank	Result	Rank
Sharon Couch	Long jump	6.64	8 Q	6.66	6
Sheila Echols	Long jump	6.55	10 Q	6.62	7
Jackie Joyner-Kersee	Long jump	6.75	5 Q	7.07	3rd place, bronze medalist(s)
Tanya Hughes	High jump	1.92	13 Q	1.88	=11
Sue Rembao	High jump	1.90	19	Did not advance	
Amber Welty	High jump	1.88	27	Did not advance	
Bonnie Dasse	Shot put	DSQ			
Pam Dukes	Shot put	16.46	15	Did not advance	
Ramona Pagel	Shot put	18.02	11 q	18.24	11
Carla Garrett	Discus throw	58.06	22	Did not advance	
Penny Neer	Discus throw	55.44	24	Did not advance	
Connie Price-Smith	Discus throw	58.66	20	Did not advance	
Paula Berry	Javelin throw	49.00	23	Did not advance	
Donna Mayhew	Javelin throw	61.24	6 q	55.68	12

Combined events – Heptathlon

Athlete	Event	100H	HJ	SP	200 m	LJ	JT	800 m	Points	Rank
Kym Carter	Result	13.97	1.85	14.35	24.54	6.10	37.58	2:08.62	6256	11
Kym Carter	Points	983	1041	817	929	880	621	985	6256	11
Cindy Greiner	Result	13.59	1.79	14.35	24.60	6.38	40.78	2:14.16	6300	9
Cindy Greiner	Points	1037	966	817	924	969	682	905	6300	9
Jackie Joyner-Kersee	Result	12.85	1.91	14.13	23.12	7.10	44.98	2:11.78	7044	1st place, gold medalist(s)
Jackie Joyner-Kersee	Points	1147	1119	803	1067	1206	763	939	7044	1st place, gold medalist(s)

== Badminton ==
Men

Athlete	Event	First round	Second round	Third round	Quarterfinal	Semifinal	Final / BM	
Athlete	Event	Opposition Result	Opposition Result	Opposition Result	Opposition Result	Opposition Result	Opposition Result	Rank
Chris Jogis	Singles	Galt (NZL); W 15–1, 15–3	Chiangta (THA); L 15–11, 3–15, 3–15	Did not advance				
Benny Lee	Singles	Blanshard (CAN); L 3–15, 1–15	Did not advance					
Thomas Reidy	Singles	Kim (KOR); L WO, WO	Did not advance					
Benny Lee; Thomas Reidy	Doubles	—N/a	Fernandes / Silva (POR); W 15–1, 15–10	Hartono / Gunawan (INA); L 3–15, 6–15	Did not advance			

Women

Athlete	Event	First round	Second round	Third round	Quarterfinal	Semifinal	Final / BM	
Athlete	Event	Opposition Result	Opposition Result	Opposition Result	Opposition Result	Opposition Result	Opposition Result	Rank
Linda French	Singles	Bye	Huang (CHN); L 1–11, 1–11	Did not advance				
Joy Kitzmiller	Singles	Jaroensiri (THA); L 3–11, 0–11	Did not advance					
Erika von Heiland	Singles	Julien (CAN); L 2–11, 0–11	Did not advance					
Linda French; Joy Kitzmiller	Doubles	—N/a	Kohara / Mizui (JPN); L 6–15, 12–15	Did not advance				

== Baseball ==
Baseball was open only to male amateurs in 1992 and 1996. As a result, the Americans and other nations where professional baseball is developed relied on collegiate players, while Cubans used their most experienced veterans, who technically were considered amateurs as they nominally held other jobs, but in fact trained full-time. In 2000, pros were admitted, but the MLB refused to release its players in 2000, 2004, and 2008, and the situation changed only a little: the Cubans still used their best players, while the Americans started using minor leaguers. The IOC cited the absence of the best players as the main reason for baseball being dropped from the Olympic program.

Summary

Team	Event	Round robin								Semifinal	Final / BM	
Team	Event	Opposition Result	Opposition Result	Opposition Result	Opposition Result	Opposition Result	Opposition Result	Opposition Result	Rank	Opposition Result	Opposition Result	Rank
United States men	Men's tournament	Spain; W 4–1	Chinese Taipei; W 10–9	Italy; W 10–0	Cuba; L 6–9	Puerto Rico; W 8–2	Dominican Republic; W 10–0	Japan; L 1–7	4 Q	Cuba; L 1–6	Bronze medal final Japan; L 3–8	4

Roster
The following was United States' roster in the baseball tournament of the 1992 Summer Olympics.

Manager: Ron Fraser

Coaches: Brad Kelley, Dave Snow, Jerry Weinstein

Pos.	No.	Player	Date of birth (age)	Bats	Throws	Club
P	25	Willie Adams	8 October 1972 (aged 19)	R	R	Stanford Cardinal
P	35	Jeff Alkire	15 November 1969 (aged 22)	R	L	Miami Hurricanes
P	37	Darren Dreifort	3 May 1972 (aged 20)	R	R	Wichita State Shockers
P	32	Rick Greene	2 January 1971 (aged 21)	R	R	LSU Tigers
P	34	Rick Helling	15 December 1970 (aged 21)	R	R	Stanford Cardinal
P	36	Daron Kirkreit	8 August 1972 (aged 19)	R	R	UC Riverside Highlanders
P	31	Chris Roberts	25 June 1971 (aged 21)	R	L	Florida State Seminoles
P	29	Ron Villone	16 January 1970 (aged 22)	L	L	UMass Minutemen
P	20	B. J. Wallace	18 May 1971 (aged 21)	R	L	Mississippi State Bulldogs
C	42	Charles Johnson	20 July 1971 (aged 21)	R	R	Miami Hurricanes
C	30	Jason Varitek	11 April 1972 (aged 20)	S	R	Georgia Tech Yellow Jackets
IF	5	Nomar Garciaparra	23 July 1973 (aged 19)	R	R	Georgia Tech Yellow Jackets
IF	21	Jason Giambi	8 January 1971 (aged 21)	L	R	Long Beach State Dirtbags
IF	23	Phil Nevin	19 January 1971 (aged 21)	R	R	Cal State Fullerton Titans
IF	11	Craig Wilson	3 September 1970 (aged 21)	R	R	Kansas State Wildcats
IF	8	Chris Wimmer	25 September 1970 (aged 21)	R	R	Wichita State Shockers
OF	12	Jeffrey Hammonds	5 March 1971 (aged 21)	R	R	Stanford Cardinal
OF	38	Chad McConnell	13 October 1970 (aged 21)	R	R	Creighton Bluejays
OF	7	Calvin Murray	30 July 1971 (aged 20)	R	R	Texas Longhorns
OF	19	Michael Tucker	25 June 1971 (aged 21)	L	R	Longwood Lancers

Note: Jason Moler of Cal State Fullerton was initially named to the squad as one of the catchers, but was replaced by Varitek due to injury prior to the start of the competition.

Preliminary Round

Pos	Team	Pld	W	L	RF	RA	RD	PCT	GB	Qualification
1	Cuba	7	7	0	78	14	+64	1.000	—	Advance to knockout round
2	Japan	7	5	2	60	15	+45	.714	2	Advance to knockout round
3	Chinese Taipei	7	5	2	61	21	+40	.714	2	Advance to knockout round
4	United States	7	5	2	49	28	+21	.714	2	Advance to knockout round
5	Puerto Rico	7	2	5	22	48	−26	.286	5	
6	Dominican Republic	7	2	5	23	60	−37	.286	5	
7	Italy	7	1	6	25	62	−37	.143	6	
8	Spain (H)	7	1	6	15	85	−70	.143	6	

Source: WBSC
(H) Hosts

Team	1	2	3	4	5	6	7	8	9	R	H	E
United States	1	0	2	1	0	0	0	0	0	4	5	0
Spain	0	0	0	1	0	0	0	0	0	1	3	2

Team	1	2	3	4	5	6	7	8	9	R	H	E
Italy	0	0	0	0	0	0	0	0		0	5	4
United States	1	0	1	0	1	1	1	5		10	15	1

Team	1	2	3	4	5	6	7	8	9	R	H	E
Puerto Rico	0	1	0	0	1	0	0	0	0	2	15	3
United States	3	0	3	0	0	0	1	1	x	8	9	1

Team	1	2	3	4	5	6	7	8	9	R	H	E
Japan	0	1	0	0	0	4	1	0	1	7	14	0
United States	0	0	0	1	0	0	0	0	0	1	7	0

Team	1	2	3	4	5	6	7	8	9	R	H	E
United States	0	3	0	0	3	1	3	0	0	10	14	1
Chinese Taipei	0	0	0	4	0	1	4	0	0	9	9	1

Team	1	2	3	4	5	6	7	8	9	R	H	E
United States	5	0	0	0	0	0	1	0	0	6	9	5
Cuba	0	0	4	2	0	3	0	0	x	9	13	4

Team	1	2	3	4	5	6	7	8	9	R	H	E
Dominican Republic	0	0	0	0	0	0	0			0	2	3
United States	0	3	0	1	4	1	1			10	11	1

Semifinal

Team	1	2	3	4	5	6	7	8	9	R	H	E
United States	0	0	0	0	0	1	0	0	0	1	7	1
Cuba	0	0	0	1	1	2	0	2	x	6	11	1

Bronze Medal Game

Team	1	2	3	4	5	6	7	8	9	R	H	E
Japan	0	4	0	0	0	4	0	0	0	8	14	1
United States	0	0	0	2	1	0	0	0	0	3	6	2

== Basketball ==
Summary

Team	Event	Group stage						Quarterfinal	Semifinal	Final / BM	
Team	Event	Opposition Result	Opposition Result	Opposition Result	Opposition Result	Opposition Result	Rank	Opposition Result	Opposition Result	Opposition Result	Rank
United States men	Men's tournament	Angola; W 116–48	Croatia; W 103–70	Germany; W 111–68	Brazil; W 127–83	Spain; W 122–81	1 Q	Puerto Rico; W 115–77	Lithuania; W 127–76	Croatia; W 117–85	1st place, gold medalist(s)
United States women	Women's tournament	Czechoslovakia; W 111–55	China; W 93–67	Spain; W 114–59	—N/a		1 Q	—N/a	Unified Team; L 73–79	Bronze medal game Cuba; W 88–74	3rd place, bronze medalist(s)

=== Men's tournament ===
Roster

United States men's national basketball team roster
Players
Coaches

Pos.	No.	Name	Age – Date of birth	Height	Club	Ctr.
F	4	Christian Laettner	22 – 17 August 1969	2.11 m (6 ft 11 in)	Duke Blue Devils	(United States)
C	5	David Robinson	26 – 6 August 1965	2.16 m (7 ft 1 in)	San Antonio Spurs	(United States)
C	6	Patrick Ewing	29 – 5 August 1962	2.13 m (7 ft 0 in)	New York Knicks	(United States)
F	7	Larry Bird	35 – 7 December 1956	2.06 m (6 ft 9 in)	Boston Celtics	(United States)
F	8	Scottie Pippen	26 – 25 September 1965	2.03 m (6 ft 8 in)	Chicago Bulls	(United States)
G	9	Michael Jordan	29 – 17 February 1963	1.98 m (6 ft 6 in)	Chicago Bulls	(United States)
G/F	10	Clyde Drexler	30 – 22 June 1962	2.01 m (6 ft 7 in)	Portland Trail Blazers	(United States)
F	11	Karl Malone	29 – 24 July 1963	2.06 m (6 ft 9 in)	Utah Jazz	(United States)
G	12	John Stockton	30 – 26 March 1962	1.85 m (6 ft 1 in)	Utah Jazz	(United States)
G/F	13	Chris Mullin	28 – 30 July 1963	2.01 m (6 ft 7 in)	Golden State Warriors	(United States)
F	14	Charles Barkley	29 – 20 February 1963	1.98 m (6 ft 6 in)	Phoenix Suns	(United States)
G	15	Magic Johnson	32 – 14 August 1959	2.06 m (6 ft 9 in)	Los Angeles Lakers	(United States)

Head coach

- (United States) Chuck Daly

Assistant coach(es)

- (United States) P. J. Carlesimo
- (United States) Mike Krzyzewski
- (United States) Lenny Wilkens

Legend

- Club – describes last
  club before the competition
- Age – describes age
  on 26 July 1992

Group stage

Pos	Team	Pld	W	L	PF	PA	PD	Pts	Qualification
1	United States	5	5	0	579	350	+229	10	Quarterfinals
2	Croatia	5	4	1	423	400	+23	9	Quarterfinals
3	Brazil	5	2	3	420	463	−43	7 (Note: Head-to-head record: Brazil 1–0 Germany)	Quarterfinals
4	Germany	5	2	3	369	432	−63	7	Quarterfinals
5	Angola	5	1	4	324	392	−68	6 (Note: Head-to-head record: Angola 1–0 Spain)	9th−12th classification round
6	Spain (H)	5	1	4	398	476	−78	6	9th−12th classification round

Source: FIBA
Rules for classification: 1) points; 2) head-to-head points; 3) head-to-head goal average; 4) head-to-head number of points scored.
(H) Hosts
Notes:

26 July 1992
16:30
v

Boxscore

Angola	48–116	United States
Scoring by half: 16–64, 32–52
Pts: Conceição, Macedo 10; Rebs: Conceição 7 Asts: Conceição 2		Pts: Barkley 24; Rebs: Barkley 6 Asts: Johnson 10

Palau Municipal d'Esports de Badalona, Barcelona

27 July 1992
20:30
v

Boxscore

Croatia	70–103	United States
Scoring by half: 37–54, 33–49
Pts: Petrović 19; Rebs: Rađa 8 Asts: Kukoč 5		Pts: Jordan 21; Rebs: Malone 5 Asts: Pippen 9

Palau Municipal d'Esports de Badalona, Barcelona

29 July 1992
20:30
v

Boxscore

United States	111–68	Germany
Scoring by half: 58–23, 53–45
Pts: Bird 19; Rebs: Malone 5 Asts: Jordan 12		Pts: Jackel, Schrempf 15; Rebs: Schrempf 8 Asts: Rödl, Schrempf 2

Palau Municipal d'Esports de Badalona, Barcelona

31 July 1992
22:30
v

Boxscore

United States	127–83	Brazil
Scoring by half: 60–41, 67–42
Pts: Barkley 30; Rebs: Ewing 9 Asts: Drexler 10		Pts: Schmidt 24; Rebs: dos Santos 9 Asts: Maury 7

Palau Municipal d'Esports de Badalona, Barcelona

2 August 1992
22:30
v

Boxscore

Spain	81–122	United States
Scoring by half: 35–65, 46–57
Pts: Jiménez 23; Rebs: Andreu 7 Asts: Jiménez 6		Pts: Barkley 20; Rebs: Ewing 10; Asts: Pippen 9

Palau Municipal d'Esports de Badalona, Barcelona

Quarterfinal

4 August 1992
22:30
v

Boxscore

United States	115–77	Puerto Rico
Scoring by half: 67–40, 48–37
Pts: Mullin 21; Rebs: Laettner 8 Asts: Pippen 8		Pts: Casiano, Ortiz 13; Rebs: Ortiz 8 Asts: Carter 4

Palau Municipal d'Esports de Badalona, Barcelona

Semifinal

6 August 1992
22:30
v

Boxscore

Lithuania	76–127	United States
Scoring by half: 30–49, 46–78
Pts: Marčiulionis 20; Rebs: Sabonis 8 Asts: Marčiulionis 8		Pts: Jordan 21; Rebs: Robinson 8 Asts: Johnson 8

Palau Municipal d'Esports de Badalona, Barcelona

Gold medal game

8 August 1992
22:00
v

Boxscore

Croatia	85–117	United States
Scoring by half: 42–56, 43–61
Pts: Petrović 24; Rebs: Rađa 6 Asts: Kukoč 9		Pts: Jordan 22; Rebs: Ewing 6 Asts: Johnson 6

Palau Municipal d'Esports de Badalona, Barcelona

Team details

Croatia	United States

SG	4	Dražen Petrović
C	14	Dino Rađa
SF	7	Toni Kukoč
C	9	Franjo Arapović
SG	5	Velimir Perasović
SG	13	Arijan Komazec
PG	12	Alan Gregov
PF	15	Aramis Naglić
PG	8	Vladan Alanović
C	10	Žan Tabak
C	11	Stojko Vranković
SG	6	Danko Cvjetićanin
Head Coach:
(Croatia) Petar Skansi

SG	9	Michael Jordan
PF	14	Charles Barkley
C	6	Patrick Ewing
SF	8	Scottie Pippen
PG	15	Magic Johnson
SF	13	Chris Mullin
SG	10	Clyde Drexler
C	5	David Robinson
PF	11	Karl Malone
PF	4	Christian Laettner
PG	12	John Stockton
SF	7	Larry Bird
Head Coach:
(United States) Chuck Daly

=== Women's tournament ===
Roster

United States women's national basketball team roster
Players
Coaches

Pos.	No.	Name	Age – Date of birth	Height	Club	Ctr.
G	4	Teresa Edwards	28 – 19 June 1964	1.65 m (5 ft 5 in)	Mitsubishi Electric Koalas	(Japan)
F/C	5	Daedra Charles	23 – 2 November 1968		Pool Comense	(Italy)
F	6	Clarissa Davis	25 – 4 June 1967
C	7	Tammy Jackson	29 – 3 December 1962		Chanson Cosmetics	(Japan)
G	8	Teresa Weatherspoon	26 – 8 December 1965
C	9	Vickie Orr	25 – 25 February 1967
F	10	Vicky Bullett	24 – 4 October 1967		Basket Puglia Bari	(Italy)
G	11	Carolyn Jones	22 – 29 July 1969
	12	Katrina McClain	26 – 19 September 1965		Ancona Basket	(Italy)
	13	Medina Dixon	29 – 2 November 1962
G	14	Cynthia Cooper	29 – 14 April 1963		Basket Parma	(Italy)
G	15	Suzie McConnell	25 – 29 July 1966

Head coach

- (United States) Theresa Grentz

Legend

- Club – describes last
  club before the competition
- Age – describes age
  on 26 July 1992

Group stage

Pos	Team	Pld	W	L	PF	PA	PD	Pts	Qualification
1	United States	3	3	0	318	181	+137	6	Semifinals
2	China	3	2	1	205	226	−21	5	Semifinals
3	Spain	3	1	2	181	238	−57	4	Classification round
4	Czechoslovakia	3	0	3	183	242	−59	3	Classification round

Source: FIBA
Rules for classification: 1) points; 2) head-to-head points; 3) head-to-head goal average; 4) head-to-head number of points scored.

30 July 1992
11:00

Boxscore

Czechoslovakia	55–111	United States
Scoring by half: 33–53, 22–58
Pts: Chupíková, Janoštinová 14; Rebs: Janoštinová 5 Asts: Bieliková, Buriánová, Janoštinová 2		Pts: Cooper 18; Rebs: Dixon 8 Asts: Dixon, Edwards 5

Palau Municipal d'Esports de Badalona, Barcelona

1 August 1992
11:00

Boxscore

United States	93–67	China
Scoring by half: 47–33, 46–34
Pts: Dixon 19; Rebs: Orr 11; Asts: Edwards 8		Pts: Cong 18; Rebs: Zheng H. 11; Asts: He 6

Palau Municipal d'Esports de Badalona, Barcelona

3 August 1992
22:00

Boxscore

Spain	59–114	United States
Scoring by half: 32–51, 27–63
Pts: Ares 13; Rebs: Geuer 6 Asts: Ares 4		Pts: Dixon 28; Rebs: McClain 8 Asts: Edwards 6

Palau Municipal d'Esports de Badalona, Barcelona

Semifinal

August 5
22:00

Boxscore

United States	73–79	Unified Team
Scoring by half: 41–47, 32–32
Pts: Dixon 12; Rebs: McClain 16; Asts: three players 3		Pts: Zasulskaya 20; Rebs: Zasulskaya 8 Asts: Shvaybovich, Antipova 4

Palau Municipal d'Esports de Badalona, Badalona

Bronze medal game

August 7
13:00

Boxscore

(bronze) United States	88–74	Cuba
Scoring by half: 44–44, 44–30
Pts: Edwards 18; Rebs: McClain 12; Asts: Edwards 5		Pts: Castillo 16; Rebs: Borrell 9 Asts: Henry 5

Palau Municipal d'Esports de Badalona, Badalona

== Boxing ==
Athlete	Event	First round	Second round	Quarterfinal	Semifinal	Final	
Athlete	Event	Opposition Result	Opposition Result	Opposition Result	Opposition Result	Opposition Result	Rank
Eric Griffin	Light flyweight	del Rosario (DOM); W 14–2	Lozano (ESP); L 2–6	Did not advance			=9
Timothy Austin	Flyweight	Bye	Strogov (BUL); W 19–7	Mwangata (TAN); W 19–8	González (CUB); L RSC	Did not advance	3rd place, bronze medalist(s)
Sergio Reyes Jr.	Bantamweight	González (PUR); W 10–1	Lee (PRK); L 8–15	Did not advance			=9
Julian Wheeler	Featherweight	Palyani (EUN); L 4–8	Did not advance				=17
Oscar De La Hoya	Lightweight	Silva (BRA); W RSC	Odion (NGR); W 16–4	Tontchev (BUL); W 16–7	Hong (KOR); W 11–10	Rudolph (GER); W 7–2	1st place, gold medalist(s)
Vernon Forrest	Light welterweight	Richardson (GBR); L 8–14	Did not advance				=17
Pepe Reilly	Welterweight	Baute (ESP); W RSC	Karpaciauskas (LTU); L 5–16	Did not advance			=9
Raúl Márquez	Light middleweight	Defiagbon (NGR); W 8–7	Cadeau (SEY); W 20–3	Delibaş (NED); L 12–16	Did not advance		=5
Chris Byrd	Middleweight	Edwards (GBR); W 21–3	Lebziak (EUN); W 16–7	Dine (ALG); W 21–2	Johnson (CAN); W 17–3	Hernández (CUB); L 7–12	2nd place, silver medalist(s)
Montell Griffin	Light heavyweight	Mabiletsa (BOT); W 10–4	Ko (KOR); W 16–1	May (GER); L 4–6	Did not advance		=5
Danell Nicholson	Heavyweight	Lawson (GBR); W 10–2	Mavrović (CRO); W 9–6	Savón (CUB); L 11–13	Did not advance		=5
Larry Donald	Super heavyweight	Bye	Kulpin (EUN); W RSC	Balado (CUB); L 4–10	Did not advance		=5

== Canoeing ==
=== Slalom ===
Men

Athlete	Event	Run 1		Run 2		Best	
Athlete	Event	Time	Rank	Time	Rank	Time	Rank
Adam Clawson	C-1	2:09.23	15	3:17.17	31	2:09.23	21
David Hearn	C-1	2:01.70	6	2:01.57	9	2:01.57	11
Jon Lugbill	C-1	1:58.62	2	1:58.69	3	1:58.62	4
Lecky Haller; Jamie McEwan	C-2	2:16.35	7	2:08.05	4	2:08.05	4
Joe Jacobi; Scott Strausbaugh	C-2	2:04.82	1	2:02.41	1	2:02.41	1st place, gold medalist(s)
Martin McCormick; Elliot Weintrob	C-2	2:30.59	13	2:32.08	13	2:30.59	15
Eric Jackson	K-1	1:52.59	10	1:57.04	14	1:52.59	13
Scott Shipley	K-1	1:59.64	21	2:00.98	23	1:59.64	27
Richard Weiss	K-1	1:54.29	14	1:53.12	7	1:53.12	16

Women

Athlete	Event	Run 1		Run 2		Best	
Athlete	Event	Time	Rank	Time	Rank	Time	Rank
Dana Chladek	K-1	2:11.75	1	3:06.46	22	2:11.75	3rd place, bronze medalist(s)
Maylon Hanold	K-1	5:32.75	25	3:13.80	23	3:13.80	25
Cathy Hearn	K-1	2:31.99	16	2:19.51	7	2:19.51	9

=== Sprint ===
Men

Athlete	Event	Heat		Repechage		Semifinal		Final	
Athlete	Event	Time	Rank	Time	Rank	Time	Rank	Time	Rank
Fred Spaulding	C-1 500 m	1:56.86	4 R	1:57.48	5 SF	1:57.48	6	Did not advance	
Fred Spaulding	C-1 1000 m	4:10.24	6 R	4:04.39	2 SF	4:13.83	6	Did not advance	
Stewart Carr; Jim Terrell	C-2 500 m	1:46.85	6 SF	—N/a		1:46.62	5	Did not advance	
Wyatt Jones; Gregory Steward	C-2 1000 m	4:01.65	7 SF	—N/a		DSQ		Did not advance	
Norman Bellingham	K-1 500 m	1:41.00	2 SF	Bye		1:41.48	1 QF	1:40.84	4
Greg Barton	K-1 1000 m	3:36.59	3 R	3:32.34	1 SF	3:36.34	1 QF	3:37.93	3rd place, bronze medalist(s)
Michael Harbold; Peter Newton	K-2 500 m	1:32.42	1 SF	Bye		1:29.80	4 QF	1:33.02	8
Greg Barton; Norman Bellingham	K-2 1000 m	3:15.74	2 SF	Bye		3:17.93	2 QF	3:19.26	4
Chris Barlow; Mark Hamilton; Mike Herbert; Terry Kent	K-4 1000 m	2:58.57	4 SF	—N/a		2:56.57	3 QF	3:04.30	9

Women

Athlete	Event	Heat		Semifinal		Final	
Athlete	Event	Time	Rank	Time	Rank	Time	Rank
Shelia Conover	K-1 500 m	1:54.57	1 SF	1:53.05	5	Did not advance	
Cathy Marino-Geers; Traci Phillips	K-2 500 m	1:53.52	6 SF	1:45.40	5	Did not advance	
Shelia Conover; Alexandra Harbold; Cathy Marino-Geers; Traci Phillips	K-4 500 m	1:36.74	2 QF	Bye		1:43.00	7

Key: QF – Qualified to medal final; SF – Qualified to semifinal; R – Qualified to repechage

== Cycling ==
Twenty cyclists represented the United States in 1992. Erin Hartwell won bronze in the men's 1 km time trial and Rebecca Twigg won bronze in the women's individual pursuit.

=== Road ===
Athlete	Event	Time	Rank
Lance Armstrong	Men's road race	4:35:56	14
Bob Mionske	Men's road race	4:42:31	75
Timm Peddie	Men's road race	4:35:56	37
George Hincapie; Scott Mercier; Nathan Sheafor; John Stenner	Men's team time trial	2:13:35	16
Jeanne Golay	Women's road race	2:05:03	6
Inga Thompson	Women's road race	2:05:03	26
Sally Zack	Women's road race	2:05:03	10

=== Track ===
Points race

Athlete	Event	First round		Final	
Athlete	Event	Points	Rank	Points	Rank
James Carney	Men's points race	6	13	Did not advance	

Pursuit

Athlete	Event	Qualification		Quarterfinal	Semifinal	Final	
Athlete	Event	Time	Rank	Opposition Result	Opposition Result	Opposition Result	Rank
Carl Sundquist	Men's individual pursuit	4:34.390	6 Q	Kingsland (AUS); L Lapped	Did not advance		12
Chris Coletta; Dirk Copeland; Matthew Hamon; Jim Pollak	Men's team pursuit	4:22.963	9	Did not advance			
Rebecca Twigg	Women's individual pursuit	3:43.218	3 Q	Longo (FRA); W 3:46.508	Watt (AUS); L 3:52.429	Did not advance	3rd place, bronze medalist(s)

Sprint

Athlete	Event	Qualification		Round 1	Repechage 1	Repechage 2	Round 2	Repechage 3	Quarterfinal	Semifinal	Final / BM / Pl.	
Athlete	Event	Time	Rank	Opposition Result	Opposition Result	Opposition Result	Opposition Result	Opposition Result	Opposition Result	Opposition Result	Opposition Result	Rank
Ken Carpenter	Men's sprint	10.561	6 Q	Kalimanto (INA), Kojima (JPN); W 10.981	Bye		Andrews (NZL), Harnett (CAN); L DSQ	Magné (FRA); W 11.390	Fiedler (GER); L	Did not advance	Classification final Kovsh (EUN), Lovito (ESP), Moreno (ESP); W 11.648	5
Connie Paraskevin-Young	Women's sprint	11.946	7	Ballanger (FRA), Kuroki (JPN); L DSQ	Neumann (GER); L	—N/a			Did not advance			

Time trial

Athlete	Event	Time	Rank
Erin Hartwell	Men's 1 km time trial	1:04.753	3rd place, bronze medalist(s)

== Diving ==
Men

Athlete	Event	Preliminary		Final	
Athlete	Event	Points	Rank	Points	Rank
Kent Ferguson	3 m springboard	374.22	12 Q	609.12	5
Mark Lenzi	3 m springboard	409.11	2 Q	676.53	1st place, gold medalist(s)
Scott Donie	10 m platform	423.45	4 Q	633.63	2nd place, silver medalist(s)
Matt Scoggin	10 m platform	379.20	12 Q	492.60	10

Women

Athlete	Event	Preliminary		Final	
Athlete	Event	Points	Rank	Points	Rank
Karen LaFace	3 m springboard	279.06	11 Q	447.75	9
Julie Ovenhouse	3 m springboard	291.48	5	477.84	5
Mary Ellen Clark	10 m platform	329.85	2 Q	401.91	3rd place, bronze medalist(s)
Ellen Owen	10 m platform	299.52	5 Q	392.10	7

== Equestrian ==
Dressage

Athlete	Horse	Event	Grand Prix		Grand Prix Special	
Athlete	Horse	Event	Points	Rank	Points	Rank
Charlotte Bredahl	Monsieur	Individual	1507	=22	Did not advance	
Robert Dover	Lectron	Individual	1507	=22	Did not advance	
Carol Lavell	Gifted	Individual	1629	6 Q	1408	6
Michael Poulin	Graf George	Individual	1495	27	Did not advance	
Charlotte Bredahl; Robert Dover; Carol Lavell; Michael Poulin	As above	Team	4634	3rd place, bronze medalist(s)	—N/a	

Eventing

Athlete	Horse	Event	Dressage		Cross-country				Show jumping			
Athlete	Horse	Event	Penalties	Rank	Penalties	Rank	Total	Rank	Penalties	Rank	Total	Rank
Stephen Bradley	Sassy Reason	Individual	65.20	=44	128.0	59	193.20	58	10	=24	203.20	52
Michael Plumb	Adonis	Individual	49.60	8	135.60	61	185.20	=56	10	=24	195.20	48
Todd Trewin	Sandscript	Individual	67.80	=52	87.20	=45	155	47	Did not advance			
Jil Walton	Patrona	Individual	63.20	=35	43.60	18	106.80	17	10	=24	116.80	17
Stephen Bradley; Michael Plumb; Todd Trewin; Jil Walton	As above	Team	178.00	7	307.20	13	485.20	13	30	=9	515.20	10

Jumping

Athlete	Horse	Event	Qualifying										Final					
Athlete	Horse	Event	Round 1		Round 2				Round 3				Round 1		Round 2			
Athlete	Horse	Event	Penalties	Rank	Penalties	Rank	Total	Rank	Penalties	Rank	Total	Rank	Penalties	Rank	Penalties	Rank	Total	Rank
Lisa Ann Jacquin	For the Moment	Individual	12	=13	12	=8	24	=10	DNS		111	=37 Q	8	=14 Q	13.25	=16	21.25	=17
Norman Dello Joio	Irish	Individual	40.5	=43	28.5	=28	68.5	38	21.5	=22	90	24 Q	0	=1 Q	4.75	4	4.75	3rd place, bronze medalist(s)
Anne Kursinski	Cannonball	Individual	82.5	=81	12	=8	94.5	53	DNS		181.5	63	Did not advance					
Michael Matz	Heisman	Individual	12	=13	0	=1	12	=4	DNS		99	=27 Q	4	=6 Q	12.25	14	16.25	10
Lisa Ann Jacquin; Norman Dello Joio; Anne Kursinski; Michael Matz	As above	Team	20	8	8	=1	28	=5	—N/a									

== Fencing ==
16 fencers represented the United States in 1992.

Men

Athlete	Event	Pool stage		Round 1	Round 2	Round 3	Round 4	Barrage 1	Barrage 2	Barrage 3	Barrage 4	Quarterfinal	Semifinal	Final / BM / Pl.	
Athlete	Event	W–L	Rank	Opposition Result	Opposition Result	Opposition Result	Opposition Result	Opposition Result	Opposition Result	Opposition Result	Opposition Result	Opposition Result	Opposition Result	Opposition Result	Rank
Nick Bravin	Individual foil	3–3	5 Q	Lo (HKG); L 0–2	Did not advance										39
Zaddick Longenbach	Individual foil	2–4	=4 Q	García (CUB); L 0–2	Did not advance										45
Mike Marx	Individual foil	3–3	4 Q	Nagano (JPN); L 0–2	Did not advance										36
Robert Marx	Individual épée	3–3	4 Q	Ječmínek (TCH); W 2–0	Cuomo (ITA); W 2–0	Kovács (HUN); L 0–2	Did not advance	Bye	Kulcsár (HUN); L 1–2	Did not advance					24
Jon Normile	Individual épée	3–3	5 Q	Lazzarini (BRA); L 1–2	Did not advance										43
Chris O'Loughlin	Individual épée	1–5	6	Did not advance											55
Bob Cottingham	Individual sabre	2–3	5 Q	Fletcher (GBR); W 2–0	Scalzo (ITA); L 0–2	Did not advance		Banos (CAN); W 2–0	Shirshov (EUN); L 1–2	Did not advance					24
Mike Lofton	Individual sabre	3–3	5 Q	Bye	Szabo (ROM); W 2–0	Meglio (ITA); L 0–2	Did not advance	Bye	Kościelniakowski (POL); L 1–2	Did not advance					21
Steve Mormando	Individual sabre	2–3	5 Q	Banos (CAN); L 0–2	Did not advance										34
Bob Cottingham; John Friedberg; Mike Lofton; Steve Mormando; Peter Westbrook	Team sabre	0–2	3	—N/a								Did not advance			9

Women

Athlete	Event	Pool stage		Round 1	Round 2	Round 3	Round 4	Barrage 1	Barrage 2	Barrage 3	Barrage 4	Quarterfinal	Semifinal	Final / BM / Pl.	
Athlete	Event	W–L	Rank	Opposition Result	Opposition Result	Opposition Result	Opposition Result	Opposition Result	Opposition Result	Opposition Result	Opposition Result	Opposition Result	Opposition Result	Opposition Result	Rank
Caitlin Bilodeaux	Individual foil	4–2	4 Q	Bye	Sobczak (POL); L 0–2	Did not advance		Bortolozzi-Borella (ITA); L 1–2	Did not advance						29
Mary O'Neill	Individual foil	1–4	5 Q	McIntosh (GBR); L 0–2	Did not advance										36
Molly Sullivan	Individual foil	1–4	6	Did not advance											39
Caitlin Bilodeaux; Ann Marsh; Sharon Monplaisir; Mary O'Neill; Molly Sullivan	Team foil	0–2	3	—N/a								Did not advance			9

== Football ==
Summary

Team	Event	Group stage				Quarterfinal	Semifinal	Final / BM	
Team	Event	Opposition Result	Opposition Result	Opposition Result	Rank	Opposition Result	Opposition Result	Opposition Result	Rank
United States men	Men's tournament	Italy; L 1–2	Kuwait; W 3–1	Poland; T 2–2	3	Did not advance			

Roster

Head coach: Lothar Osiander

No.	Pos.	Player	DoB	Age	Caps	Club	Tournament games	Tournament goals	Minutes played	Sub off	Sub on	Cards yellow/red
1	GK	Brad Friedel	18 May 1971	21	10	(United States) UCLA	3	0	270
2	DF	Cam Rast	16 January 1970	22	6	(United States) Santa Clara University	2	0	180
3	DF	Alexi Lalas	1 June 1970	22	9		1	0	90
4	DF	Mike Burns	14 September 1970	21	?
5	DF	Erik Imler	1 June 1971	21	?	(United States) Virginia Cavaliers
6	MF	Dario Brose	27 January 1970	22	?	(France) Stade Briochin
7	FW	Dante Washington	21 November 1970	21	?	(United States) Radford
8	DF	Mike Lapper	28 August 1970	19	?
9	FW	Steve Snow	2 March 1971	21	?	(Belgium) Standard Liège
10	MF	Claudio Reyna	20 July 1973	19	?	(United States) Virginia Cavaliers
11	MF	Yari Allnutt	2 February 1970	22	?	(United States) University of Portland
12	DF	Troy Dayak	21 January 1971	21	?	(United States) San Francisco Bay Blackhawks
13	FW	Joe-Max Moore	23 February 1971	21	?	(United States) UCLA Bruins
14	MF	Cobi Jones	16 June 1970	22	?
15	DF	Zak Ibsen	2 June 1972	20	?	(United States) UCLA
16	MF	Manny Lagos	11 June 1971	21	?	(United States) Minnesota Thunder
17	MF	Mike Huwiler	1 April 1972	20	?	(United States) Virginia Cavaliers
18	GK	Ian Feuer	20 May 1971	21	?	(Belgium) Molenbeek
19	MF	Chris Henderson	11 December 1970	21	?	(United States) Seattle Storm
20	DF	Curt Onalfo	19 November 1969	22	?	(France) La Ciotat

Group stage

Team	Pld	W	D	L	GF	GA	GD	Pts
Poland	3	2	1	0	7	2	+5	5
Italy	3	2	0	1	3	4	−1	4
United States	3	1	1	1	6	5	+1	3
Kuwait	3	0	0	3	1	6	−5	0

Source: FIFA
24 July 1992
18:00

Italy	2–1	United States
Melli 15'; Albertini 22'	Report	Moore 65'

Camp Nou, Barcelona
Attendance: 18,000
Referee: Manuel Díaz Vega (ESP)

27 July 1992
19:00

United States	3–1	Kuwait
Brose 56'; Lagos 79'; Snow 85'	Report	Marwi 16'

Estadio La Romareda, Zaragoza
Attendance: 4,500
Referee: Lim Kee Chong (MRI)

29 July 1992
19:00

United States	2–2	Poland
Imler 20'; Snow 85'	Report	Koźmiński 31'; Juskowiak 40'

Estadio La Romareda, Zaragoza
Attendance: 3,000
Referee: Lim Kee Chong (MRI)

== Gymnastics ==
=== Artistic ===
Men
Team

Athlete	Event	Apparatus												Total	
Athlete	Event	F		PH		R		V		PB		HB		Total	
Athlete	Event	C	O	C	O	C	O	C	O	C	O	C	O	Score	Rank
Trent Dimas	Team	9.325	9.475	9.350	9.475	9.575	9.125	9.400	9.550	9.625	9.325	9.725	9.725 Q	113.675	44
Scott Keswick	Team	9.650	9.675	9.550	9.150	9.775	9.650	9.525	9.000	9.575	9.475	9.700	9.000	113.725	43 Q
Jair Lynch	Team	9.525	9.075	9.550	9.500	9.475	9.300	8.975	8.800	9.550	9.700 Q	9.650	9.675	112.775	60
Dominick Minicucci, Jr.	Team	9.425	9.350	9.425	9.625	9.525	9.475	9.325	9.350	9.425	9.425	9.650	8.950	112.950	56
John Roethlisberger	Team	9.600	9.650	9.150	9.700	9.700	9.525	9.375	9.500	9.500	9.300	9.675	9.525	114.200	36 Q
Chris Waller	Team	9.650	9.575	9.650	9.775 Q	9.675	9.550	9.025	9.525	9.600	9.525	9.650	9.600	114.800	27 Q
Total	Team	95.575		95.600		95.750		93.575		95.300		95.925		571.725	6

Individual finals

Athlete	Event	Apparatus						Total	
Athlete	Event	F	PH	R	V	PB	HB	Score	Rank
Scott Keswick	All-around	9.400	9.050	9.625	9.700	9.600	9.725	57.100	19
John Roethlisberger	All-around	8.400	9.550	9.425	9.700	9.525	9.500	56.100	34
Chris Waller	All-around	8.575	9.675	9.600	9.125	9.450	9.375	55.800	35
Chris Waller	Pommel horse	—N/a	9.825	—N/a				9.825	5
Jair Lynch	Parallel bars	—N/a				9.712	—N/a	9.712	6
Trent Dimas	Horizontal bar	—N/a					9.875	9.875	1st place, gold medalist(s)

Women
Team

Athlete	Event	Apparatus								Total	
Athlete	Event	V		UB		BB		F		Total	
Athlete	Event	C	O	C	O	C	O	C	O	Score	Rank
Wendy Bruce	Team	9.825	9.950	9.787	9.850	9.650	9.712	9.750	9.637	78.161	28
Dominique Dawes	Team	9.762	9.900	9.762	9.812	9.750	9.637	9.812	9.925	78.360	26
Shannon Miller	Team	9.950	9.925 Q	9.912	9.950 Q	9.887	9.900 Q	9.887	9.900 Q	79.311	1 Q
Betty Okino	Team	9.887	9.937	9.850	9.887	9.862	9.850 Q	9.900	9.825	78.998	6 Q
Kerri Strug	Team	9.837	9.950	9.837	9.862	9.775	9.750	9.887	9.837	78.735	14
Kim Zmeskal	Team	9.900	9.995 Q	9.887	9.900	9.350	9.912	9.925	9.925 Q	78.749	12 Q
Total	Team	99.111		98.722		98.048		98.823		394.704	3rd place, bronze medalist(s)

Individual finals

Athlete	Event	Apparatus				Total	
Athlete	Event	V	UB	BB	F	Score	Rank
Shannon Miller	All-around	9.925	9.900	9.925	9.975	39.725	2nd place, silver medalist(s)
Betty Okino	All-around	9.850	9.862	9.850	9.825	39.387	12
Kim Zmeskal	All-around	9.800	9.775	9.900	9.937	39.412	10
Shannon Miller	Vault	9.837	—N/a			9.837	6
Kim Zmeskal	Vault	9.593	—N/a			9.593	8
Shannon Miller	Uneven bars	—N/a	9.962	—N/a		9.962	3rd place, bronze medalist(s)
Shannon Miller	Balance beam	—N/a		9.912	—N/a	9.912	2nd place, silver medalist(s)
Betty Okino	Balance beam	—N/a		9.837	—N/a	9.837	6
Shannon Miller	Floor	—N/a			9.912	9.912	3rd place, bronze medalist(s)
Kim Zmeskal	Floor	—N/a			9.900	9.900	6

=== Rhythmic ===
Athlete	Event	Preliminary round						Final round					
Athlete	Event	Apparatus				Total		Apparatus				Total	
Athlete	Event	Rope	Hoop	Ball	Clubs	Score	Rank	Rope	Hoop	Ball	Clubs	Score	Rank
Tamara Levinson	All-around	9.025	9.000	8.200	8.250	34.475	40	Did not advance					
Jenifer Lovell	All-around	9.025	9.125	8.950	9.025	36.125	23	Did not advance					

== Handball ==
Summary

Team	Event	Preliminary round				Semifinal	Final / BM / Pl.	
Team	Event	Opposition Result	Opposition Result	Opposition Result	Rank	Opposition Result	Opposition Result	Rank
United States women	Women's tournament	Unified Team; L 16–23	Germany; L 16–32	Nigeria; W 23–21	3	Did not advance	5th place final Austria; L 17–26	6

=== Women's tournament ===
Roster The following players represented United States:

- Sharon Cain
- Kim Clarke
- Laura Coenen
- Laurie Fellner
- Sam Jones
- Portia Lack
- Dannette Leininger
- Pat Neder
- Karyn Palgut
- Carol Peterka
- Angie Raynor
- Barbara Schaaf
- Cindy Stinger

Preliminary round

Pos	Team	Pld	W	D	L	GF	GA	GD	Pts	Qualification
1	Unified Team	3	3	0	0	77	56	+21	6	Semifinals
2	Germany	3	2	0	1	86	61	+25	4	Semifinals
3	United States	3	1	0	2	55	76	−21	2	Fifth place game
4	Nigeria	3	0	0	3	56	81	−25	0	Seventh place game

30 July 1992; 15:00	Unified Team	23–16	United States	Palau d'Esports de Granollers, Granollers; Referees: Gallego, Lamas (ESP)
30 July 1992; 15:00	Morskova 8	(14–9)	Peterka 4	Palau d'Esports de Granollers, Granollers; Referees: Gallego, Lamas (ESP)

1 August 1992; 15:00	United States	16–32	Germany	Palau d'Esports de Granollers, Granollers; Referees: Convents, Xhonneux (BEL)
1 August 1992; 15:00	Jones 7	(6–16)	Fittinger, Leonte 8	Palau d'Esports de Granollers, Granollers; Referees: Convents, Xhonneux (BEL)

3 August 1992; 10:00	United States	23–21	Nigeria	Palau d'Esports de Granollers, Granollers; Referees: Christensen, Jørgensen (DEN)
3 August 1992; 10:00	Jones 8	(12–9)	Abi 10	Palau d'Esports de Granollers, Granollers; Referees: Christensen, Jørgensen (DEN)

5th place game

7 August 1992; 11:00	United States	17–26	Austria	Palau d'Esports de Granollers, Granollers; Referees: Convents, Xhonneux (BEL)
7 August 1992; 11:00	Cain 5	(6–11)	Matei 7	Palau d'Esports de Granollers, Granollers; Referees: Convents, Xhonneux (BEL)

== Judo ==
Men

Athlete	Event	Round of 64	Round of 32	Round of 16	Quarterfinal	Semifinal	Repechage 1	Repechage 2	Repechage 3	Repechage 4	Final / BM	
Athlete	Event	Opposition Result	Opposition Result	Opposition Result	Opposition Result	Opposition Result	Opposition Result	Opposition Result	Opposition Result	Opposition Result	Opposition Result	Rank
Tony Okada	–60 kg	Pradayrol (FRA); L 0000–0000 Y	Did not advance									=35
Jimmy Pedro	–65 kg	Kaiser (LIE); W 1000–0000	Au (HKG); W 1000–0000	Maruyama (JPN); L 0000–0010	Did not advance							=20
Mike Swain	–71 kg	Park (PRK); L 0000–1000	Did not advance									=34
Jason Morris	–78 kg	Bye	Abakar (CHA); W 1000–0000	Varayev (EUN); W 0010–0000	Wurth (NED); W 0010–0000	Adolfsson (SWE); W 1000–0000	Bye				Yoshida (JPN); L 0000–1000	2nd place, silver medalist(s)
Joseph Wanag	–86 kg	Bye	Croitoru (ROM); L 0000–1000	Did not advance								=21
Leo White	–95 kg	—N/a	El-Shewy (EGY); W 0200–0000	Traineau (FRA); W 1000–0000	Meijer (NED); L 0000–0000 C	Did not advance	—N/a	Bye	Kai (JPN); L 0000–0110	Did not advance		=9
Damon Keeve	+95 kg	—N/a	Csősz (HUN); L 000–0000 K	Did not advance			—N/a	Venturelli (ITA); W 1000–0000	Stoykov (BUL); W 0100–0000	Moreno (CUB); L 0000–1000	Did not advance	=7

Women

Athlete	Event	Round of 32	Round of 16	Quarterfinal	Semifinal	Repechage 1	Repechage 2	Repechage 3	Final / BM	
Athlete	Event	Opposition Result	Opposition Result	Opposition Result	Opposition Result	Opposition Result	Opposition Result	Opposition Result	Opposition Result	Rank
Jo Anne Quiring	–52 kg	Muñoz (ESP); L 0000–0000 Y	Did not advance			Çalışkan (TUR); W 0010–0000	Rendle (GBR); L 0000–1000	Did not advance		=9
Kate Donahoo	–56 kg	Segarra (PUR); W 0001–0000	Flagothier (BEL); L 0000–0100	Did not advance		Bye	Cavalleri (POR); W 0100–0000	Arnaud (FRA); W 0001–0000	Bronze medal final González (CUB); L 0000–0010	=5
Lynn Roethke	–61 kg	Blum (LIE); L 0000–0001	Did not advance							=20
Grace Jividen	–66 kg	Bye	Revé (CUB); L 0000–0010	Did not advance		Wu (TPE); W 1000–0000	Király (HUN); W 0100–0000	Rakels (BEL); L 0000–0000 S	Did not advance	=7
Sandy Bacher	–72 kg	Horton (GBR); L 0000–0000 Y	Did not advance			André (BRA); W 0010–0000	Schüttenhelm (GER); L 0000–0001	Did not advance		=9
Colleen Rosensteel	+72 kg	Bye	Sakaue (JPN); L 0000–1000	Did not advance		Andrade (BRA); L 0000–1000	Did not advance			=13

== Modern pentathlon ==
Three pentathletes represented the United States in 1992.

Athlete	Event	Fencing (épée one touch)			Swimming (300 m freestyle)			Riding (show jumping)			Shooting (10 m air pistol)			Running (4000 m cross-country)			Total	
Athlete	Event	RR	Rank	MP points	Time	Rank	MP points	Penalties	Rank	MP points	Score	Rank	MP points	Time	Rank	MP points	MP points	Rank
Michael Gostigian	Individual	30 V – 35 D	=46	728	3:13.90	2	1324	120	28	980	189	=12	1105	13:29.30	25	1138	5275	9
James Haley	Individual	34 V – 31 D	=28	796	3:22.10	=19	1256	60	12	1040	188	=17	1090	14:19.30	53	988	5170	25
Rob Stull	Individual	45 V – 20 D	3	983	3:25.10	33	1232	225	44	875	182	=42	1000	13:37.90	34	1114	5204	20
Michael Gostigian; James Haley; Rob Stull	Team	—N/a	=4	2507	—N/a	1	3812	—N/a	6	2895	—N/a	5	3195	—N/a	10	3240	15649	4

== Rowing ==
Men

Athlete	Event	Heat		Repechage		Semifinal		Final	
Athlete	Event	Time	Rank	Time	Rank	Time	Rank	Time	Rank
Greg Walker	Single sculls	7:13.62	4 R	7:11.85	3 SC/D	7:05.54	4 FD	7:12.32	18
John Pescatore; Peter Sharis	Coxless pair	6:52.43	4 R	6:45.31	2 SA/B	6:35.99	3 FA	6:39.23	6
John Moore; Aaron Pollock; Stephen Shellans Jr.	Coxed pair	7:04.78	3 R	7:08.41	2 SA/B	6:54.78	5 FB	7:04.84	8
Jon Smith; Gregory Springer	Double sculls	6:43.79	2 SA/B	Bye		6:26.69	5 FB	6:26.67	9
Thomas Bohrer; Doug Burden; Patrick Manning; Jeffrey McLaughlin	Coxless four	6:00.93	1 SA/B	Bye		5:58.87	1 FA	5:56.68	2nd place, silver medalist(s)
Teo Bielefeld; Tim Evans; Sean Hall; James Neil; Jack Rusher	Coxed four	6:21.79	2 R	6:18.10	1 FA	—N/a		6:06.03	4
Bob Kaehler; Chip McKibben; Keir Pearson; John Riley	Quadruple sculls	5:49.28	4 R	5:56.98	1 SA/B	5:52.48	4 FB	5:55.06	8
Malcolm Baker; Richard Kennelly Jr. Jeff Klepacki; Michael Moore; Scott Munn; John Parker; Chris Sahs; Rob Shepherd; Mike Teti	Eight	5:33.37	1 SA/B	Bye		5:37.11	2 FA	5:33.18	4

Women

Athlete	Event	Heat		Repechage		Semifinal		Final	
Athlete	Event	Time	Rank	Time	Rank	Time	Rank	Time	Rank
Anne Marden	Single sculls	7:40.12	1 SA/B	Bye		7:35.72	2 FA	7:29.84	4
Stephanie Pierson; Anna Seaton	Pair	7:40.19	1 SA/B	Bye		7:11.70	1 FA	7:08.11	3rd place, bronze medalist(s)
Mary Mazzio; Cindy Ryder	Double sculls	7:26.73	4 R	7:22.29	2 SA/B	7:13.04	6 FB	7:12.24	11
Shelagh Donohoe; Cynthia Eckert; Carol Feeney; Amy Fuller	Four	6:46.03	2 R	6:48.55	1 FA	—N/a		6:31.86	2nd place, silver medalist(s)
Serena Eddy-Moulton; Kristine Karlson; Michelle Knox-Zaloom; Alison Townley	Quadruple sculls	6:36.73	2 R	6:30.93	1 FA	—N/a		6:32.65	5
Tina Brown; Shannon Day; Yasmin Farooq; Sarah Gengler; Kelley Jones; Betsy McCagg; Mary McCagg; Diana Olson; Tracy Rude	Eight	6:15.52	3 R	6:13.83	3 FA	—N/a		6:12.25	6

Qualification legend: FA=Final A (medal); FB=Final B (non-medal); FC=Final C (non-medal); FD=Final D (non-medal); SA/B=Semifinal A/B; SC/D=Semifinal C/D; R=Repechage

== Sailing ==
Men

Athlete	Event	Race										Total	
Athlete	Event	1	2	3	4	5	6	7	8	9	10	Points	Rank
Mike Gebhardt	Lechner A-390	5.7	8.0	10.0	3.0	~~17.0~~	13.0	17.0	5.7	3.0	5.7	71.1	2nd place, silver medalist(s)
Brian Ledbetter	Finn	~~18.0~~	0.0	8.0	16.0	16.0	3.0	11.7	—N/a			54.7	2nd place, silver medalist(s)
Kevin Burnham; Morgan Reeser	470	19.0	3.0	11.7	~~23.0~~	0.0	13.0	20.0	—N/a			66.7	2nd place, silver medalist(s)

Women

Athlete	Event	Race										Total	
Athlete	Event	1	2	3	4	5	6	7	8	9	10	Points	Rank
Lanee Butler	Lechner A-390	11.7	17.0	19.0	17.0	3.0	~~20.0~~	13.0	0.0	15.0	0.0	95.7	5
Julia Trotman	Europe	0.0	3.0	~~31.0~~	5.7	8.0	31.0	15.0	—N/a			62.7	3rd place, bronze medalist(s)
Pamela Healy; Jennifer Isler	470	~~21.0~~	11.7	3.0	3.0	3.0	10.0	10.0	—N/a			40.7	3rd place, bronze medalist(s)

Open
Fleet racing

Athlete	Event	Race							Total	
Athlete	Event	1	2	3	4	5	6	7	Points	Rank
Stephen Bourdow; Paul Foerster	Flying Dutchman	11.7	0.0	0.0	0.0	~~23.0~~	8.0	13.0	32.7	2nd place, silver medalist(s)
Keith Notary; Randy Smyth	Tornado	0.0	3.0	~~29.0~~	14.0	0.0	8.0	17.0	42.0	2nd place, silver medalist(s)
Hal Haenel; Mark Reynolds	Star	3.0	0.0	5.7	0.0	5.7	17.0	~~33.0~~	31.7	1st place, gold medalist(s)

Mixed racing

Athlete	Event	Fleet racing								Match racing									
Athlete	Event	Race						Total		Round robin							Semifinal	Final / BM	
Athlete	Event	1	2	3	4	5	6	Points	Rank	Opposition Result	Opposition Result	Opposition Result	Opposition Result	Opposition Result	Points	Rank	Opposition Result	Opposition Result	Rank
Jim Brady; Doug Kern; Kevin Mahaney	Soling	0.0	13.0	5.7	0.0	5.7	~~31.0~~	24.4	1 Q	Great Britain; W	Spain; W	Germany; L	Denmark; W	Sweden; W	4	1 Q	Great Britain; W 2–0	Denmark; L 0–2	2nd place, silver medalist(s)

== Shooting ==
Men

Athlete	Event	Qualification		Semifinal				Final			
Athlete	Event	Score	Rank	Score	Rank	Total	Rank	Score	Rank	Total	Rank
Ben Amonette	10 m air pistol	577	14	—N/a				Did not advance			
Darius Young	10 m air pistol	571	33	—N/a				Did not advance			
Francis Allen	10 m running target	564	15	—N/a				Did not advance			
Roy Hill	10 m running target	570	11	—N/a				Did not advance			
Robert Foth	10 m air rifle	590	5 Q	—N/a				99.4	6	689.4	7
David Johnson	10 m air rifle	589	11	—N/a				Did not advance			
Ben Amonette	50 m pistol	555	19	—N/a				Did not advance			
Darius Young	50 m pistol	566	3 Q	—N/a				89	6	655	4
Roger Mar	25 m rapid fire pistol	586	9	Did not advance							
John McNally	25 m rapid fire pistol	587	6 Q	194	4	781	5	Did not advance			
Michael Anti	50 m rifle prone	594	18	—N/a				Did not advance			
William E. Meek	50 m rifle prone	596	9	—N/a				Did not advance			
Robert Foth	50 m rifle three positions	1169	3 Q	—N/a				97.6	3	1266.6	2nd place, silver medalist(s)
David Johnson	50 m rifle three positions	1155	21	—N/a				Did not advance			

Women

Athlete	Event	Qualifying		Final			
Athlete	Event	Score	Rank	Score	Rank	Total	Rank
Elizabeth Callahan	10 m air pistol	372	37	Did not advance			
Constance Petracek	10 m air pistol	375	24	Did not advance			
Launi Meili	10 m air rifle	391	=11	Did not advance			
Debra Sinclair	10 m air rifle	391	=11	Did not advance			
Constance Petracek	25 m pistol	570	29	Did not advance			
Roxane Thompson	25 m pistol	572	24	Did not advance			
Launi Meili	50 m rifle three positions	587 OR	1 Q	97.3	4	684.3 OR	1st place, gold medalist(s)
Ann-Marie Pfiffner	50 m rifle three positions	578	12	Did not advance			

Open shotgun

Athlete	Event	Qualification		Semifinal				Final			
Athlete	Event	Points	Rank	Points	Rank	Total	Rank	Points	Rank	Total	Rank
Bret Erickson	Trap	145	13 Q	46	=17	191	=16	Did not advance			
James Graves	Trap	140	=29	Did not advance							
Jay Waldron	Trap	147	3 Q	48	=7	195	5 Q	22	=5	217	6
Matthew Dryke	Skeet	149	2 Q	49	=10	198	5 Q	23	=4	221	6
Connie Fluker	Skeet	145	25	Did not advance							
James Graves	Skeet	148	7 Q	49	=10	197	=11	Did not advance			

== Swimming ==
Men

Athlete	Event	Heat		Final	
Athlete	Event	Time	Rank	Time	Rank
Matt Biondi	50 m freestyle	22.32	2 FA	22.09	2nd place, silver medalist(s)
Tom Jager	50 m freestyle	22.45	3 FA	22.30	3rd place, bronze medalist(s)
Matt Biondi	100 m freestyle	49.75	4 FA	49.53	5
Jon Olsen	100 m freestyle	49.63	3 FA	49.51	4
Doug Gjertsen	200 m freestyle	1:48.65	8 FA	1:50.57	8
Joe Hudepohl	200 m freestyle	1:48.52	6 FA	1:48.36	6
Dan Jorgensen	400 m freestyle	3:53.20	14 FB	DNS	
Sean Killion	400 m freestyle	3:52.42	13 FB	3:52.76	11
Lawrence Frostad	1500 m freestyle	15:21.37	7 FA	15:19.41	7
Sean Killion	1500 m freestyle	15:27.49	12	Did not advance	
David Berkoff	100 m backstroke	54.84	3 FA	54.78	3rd place, bronze medalist(s)
Jeff Rouse	100 m backstroke	54.63	1 FA	54.04	2nd place, silver medalist(s)
Tripp Schwenk	200 m backstroke	1:59.92	6 FA	1:59.73	5
Royce Sharp	200 m backstroke	2:00.97	11 FB	DNS	
Hans Dersch	100 m breaststroke	1:03.14	15 FB	1:02.39	10
Nelson Diebel	100 m breaststroke	1:01.80	3 FA	1:01.50 OR	1st place, gold medalist(s)
Mike Barrowman	200 m breaststroke	2:11.48 OR	1 FA	2:10.16 WR	1st place, gold medalist(s)
Roque Santos	200 m breaststroke	2:14.71	9 FB	1:15.73	12
Pablo Morales	100 m butterfly	53.59	1 FA	53.32	1st place, gold medalist(s)
Melvin Stewart	100 m butterfly	54.26	8 FA	54.04	5
Melvin Stewart	200 m butterfly	1:56.99	1 FA	1:56.26 OR	1st place, gold medalist(s)
David Wharton	200 m butterfly	2:00.84	12 FB	2:01.08	10
Greg Burgess	200 m individual medley	2:01.35	3 FA	2:00.97	2nd place, silver medalist(s)
Ron Karnaugh	200 m individual medley	2:01.64	4 FA	2:02.18	6
Eric Namesnik	400 m individual medley	4:17.75	1 FA	4:15.57	2nd place, silver medalist(s)
David Wharton	400 m individual medley	4:20.73	8 FA	4:17.26	4
Matt Biondi; Joe Hudepohl; Tom Jager; Shaun Jordan^{[c]} Jon Olsen; Joel Thomas^{[c]}	4 × 100 m freestyle relay	3:18.50	2 FA	3:16.74	1st place, gold medalist(s)
Doug Gjertsen; Joe Hudepohl; Scott Jaffe^{[c]} Dan Jorgensen^{[c]} Jon Olsen; Melvin Stewart	4 × 200 m freestyle relay	7:23.70	6 FA	7:16.23	3rd place, bronze medalist(s)
David Berkoff^{[c]} Matt Biondi^{[c]} Hans Dersch^{[c]} Nelson Diebel; Pablo Morales; Jon Olsen; Jeff Rouse; Melvin Stewart^{[c]}	4 × 100 m medley relay	3:39.84	1 FA	3:36.93 =WR	1st place, gold medalist(s)

Women

Athlete	Event	Heat		Final	
Athlete	Event	Time	Rank	Time	Rank
Angel Martino	50 m freestyle	25.63	=2 FA	25.23	3rd place, bronze medalist(s)
Jenny Thompson	50 m freestyle	25.63	=2 FA	25.37	5
Nicole Haislett	100 m freestyle	55.67	4 FA	55.19	4
Jenny Thompson	100 m freestyle	54.69 OR	1 FA	54.84	2nd place, silver medalist(s)
Nicole Haislett	200 m freestyle	1:59.33	2 FA	1:57.90 AM	1st place, gold medalist(s)
Jenny Thompson	200 m freestyle	2:01.71	12 FB	DNS	
Janet Evans	400 m freestyle	4:09.38	1 FA	4:07.37	2nd place, silver medalist(s)
Erika Hansen	400 m freestyle	4:12.08	3 FA	4:11.50	4
Janet Evans	800 m freestyle	8:32.69	1 FA	8:25.52	1st place, gold medalist(s)
Erika Hansen	800 m freestyle	8:36.56	4 FA	8:39.25	7
Lea Loveless	100 m backstroke	1:01.19	2 FA	1:01.43	3rd place, bronze medalist(s)
Janie Wagstaff	100 m backstroke	1:02.29	5 FA	1:01.81	5
Lea Loveless	200 m backstroke	2:11.32	2 FA	2:11.54	4
Janie Wagstaff	200 m backstroke	2:13.91	9 FB	DNS	
Megan Kleine	100 m breaststroke	1:11.04	14 FB	1:11.07	12
Anita Nall	100 m breaststroke	1:09.32	2 FA	1:08.17 AM	2nd place, silver medalist(s)
Jill Johnson	200 m breaststroke	2:30.80	9 FB	2:33.89	14
Anita Nall	200 m breaststroke	2:27.77	1 FA	2:26.88	3rd place, bronze medalist(s)
Crissy Ahmann-Leighton	100 m butterfly	1:00.10	6 FA	58.74	2nd place, silver medalist(s)
Summer Sanders	100 m butterfly	1:00.38	7 FA	59.82	6
Summer Sanders	200 m butterfly	2:10.58	2 FA	2:08.67	1st place, gold medalist(s)
Angie Wester-Krieg	200 m butterfly	2:12.00	6 FA	2:11.46	6
Nicole Haislett	200 m individual medley	2:17.40	9 FB	DNS	
Summer Sanders	200 m individual medley	2:14.68	1 FA	2:11.91 AM	2nd place, silver medalist(s)
Erika Hansen	400 m individual medley	4:48.13	10 FB	4:48.37	10
Summer Sanders	400 m individual medley	4:43.95	2 FA	4:37.58	3rd place, bronze medalist(s)
Crissy Ahmann-Leighton^{[c]} Nicole Haislett; Angel Martino; Ashley Tappin^{[c]} Jenny Thompson; Dara Torres	4 × 100 m freestyle relay	3:41.57	1 FA	3:39.46 WR	1st place, gold medalist(s)
Crissy Ahmann-Leighton; Nicole Haislett^{[c]} Megan Kleine^{[c]} Lea Loveless; Anita Nall; Summer Sanders^{[c]} Jenny Thompson; Janie Wagstaff^{[c]}	4 × 100 m medley relay	4:10.83	3 FA	4:02.54 WR	1st place, gold medalist(s)

^{c} - Athlete swam in the heat but not the final.
Note: Times in the first round ranked across all heats.
Qualification legend: FA – Advance to medal final; FB – Advance to non-medal final

== Synchronized swimming ==
Three female synchronized swimmers represented the United States in 1992.

Athlete	Event	Qualification						Final			
Athlete	Event	Technical figures		Free swim		Total		Free swim		Total	
Athlete	Event	Score	Rank	Score	Rank	Score	Rank	Score	Rank	Score	Rank
Kristen Babb-Sprague	Solo	92.808	1	98.52	=1	191.328	1 Q	99.04	2	191.848	1st place, gold medalist(s)
Karen Josephson; Sarah Josephson	Duet	92.575	1	98.64	1	191.215	1 Q	99.60	1	191.175	1st place, gold medalist(s)

== Table tennis ==
Athlete	Event	Group stage				Round of 16	Quarterfinal	Semifinal	Final	
Athlete	Event	Opposition Result	Opposition Result	Opposition Result	Rank	Opposition Result	Opposition Result	Opposition Result	Opposition Result	Rank
Jim Butler	Men's singles	Primorac (CRO); L 0–2	Nathan (PER); W 2–0	Jančí (TCH); W 2–1	2	Did not advance				
Sean O'Neill	Men's singles	Lo (HKG); L 0–2	Yoo (KOR); L 1–2	Roque (CUB); W 2–0	3	Did not advance				
Jim Butler; Sean O'Neill	Men's doubles	Casares / Pales (ESP); L 1–2	Kim J-M / Kim S-h (PRK); L 0–2	A Mazunov / D Mazunov (EUN); L 0–2	4	—N/a	Did not advance			
Insook Bhushan	Women's singles	Al-Hindi (JOR); W 2–0	Deng (CHN); L 0–2	Chiu (CAN); W 2–0	2	Did not advance				
Diana Gee	Women's singles	Tepes (CHI); W 2–0	Nemes (GER); L 0–2	Hong (KOR); L 0–2	3	Did not advance				
Lily Hugh-Yip	Women's singles	Yu (PRK); L 0–2	Amankwaa (GHA); W 2–0	Li (NZL); L 0–2	3	Did not advance				
Diana Gee; Lily Hugh-Yip	Women's doubles	Chai / Chan (HKG); L 0–2	Coubat / Wang-Dréchou (FRA); L 0–2	Gabaglio / Kim (ARG); W 2–0	3	—N/a	Did not advance			

== Tennis ==
Men

Athlete	Event	First round	Second round	Third round	Quarterfinal	Semifinal	Final	
Athlete	Event	Opposition Result	Opposition Result	Opposition Result	Opposition Result	Opposition Result	Opposition Result	Rank
Michael Chang	Singles	Mancini (ARG); W 6–1, 6–4, 3–6, 6–0	Oncins (BRA); L 2–6, 6–3, 3–6, 3–6	Did not advance				
Jim Courier	Singles	Krishnan (IND); W 6–2, 4–6, 6–1, 6–4	Bloom (ISR); W 6–2, 6–0, 6–0	Rosset (SUI); L 4–6, 2–6, 1–6	Did not advance			
Pete Sampras	Singles	Masur (AUS); W 6–1, 7–6^{(7–4)}, 6–4	Yzaga (PER); W 6–3, 6–0, 3–6, 6–1	Cherkasov (EUN); L 7–6^{(9–7)}, 6–1, 5–7, 0–6, 3–6	Did not advance			
Jim Courier; Pete Sampras	Doubles	—N/a	Edberg / Järryd (SWE); W 1–6, 6–4, 4–6, 7–6^{(8–6)}, 6–4	Casal / Sánchez (ESP); L 7–5, 6–4, 3–6, 2–6, 2–6	Did not advance			

Women

Athlete	Event	First round	Second round	Third round	Quarterfinal	Semifinal	Final	
Athlete	Event	Opposition Result	Opposition Result	Opposition Result	Opposition Result	Opposition Result	Opposition Result	Rank
Jennifer Capriati	Singles	Reinach (RSA); W 6–1, 6–0	Tarabini (ARG); W 6–4, 6–1	Basuki (INA); W 6–3, 6–4	Huber (GER); W 6–3, 7–6^{(6–1)}	Sánchez Vicario (ESP); W 6–3, 3–6, 6–1	Graf (GER); W 3–6, 6–3, 6–4	1st place, gold medalist(s)
Mary Joe Fernández	Singles	Chen (CHN); W 6–2, 6–3	Hy (CAN); W 6–2, 1–6, 12–10	Zvereva (EUN); W 7–6^{(10–9)}, 6–1	Maleeva-Fragniere (SUI); W 5–7, 6–1, 6–0	Graf (GER); L 4–6, 2–6	Did not advance	3rd place, bronze medalist(s)
Zina Garrison-Jackson	Singles	Coetzer (RSA); L 5–7, 1–6	Did not advance					
Gigi Fernández; Mary Joe Fernández	Doubles	—N/a	Muns-Jagerman / Schultz (NED); W 6–0, 6–0	Graf / Huber (GER); W 7–6^{(7–3)}, 6–4	de Swardt / Reinach (RSA); W 6–2, 6–4	Meskhi / Zvereva (EUN); W 6–4, 7–5	Martínez / Sánchez Vicario (ESP); W 7–5, 6–6, 6–2	1st place, gold medalist(s)

== Volleyball ==
Summary

Team	Event	Preliminary round						Quarterfinal	Semifinal	Final / BM	
Team	Event	Opposition Result	Opposition Result	Opposition Result	Opposition Result	Opposition Result	Rank	Opposition Result	Opposition Result	Opposition Result	Rank
United States men	Men's tournament	Japan; L 1–3	Canada; W 3–2	Spain; W 3–2	France; W 3–0	Italy; W 3–1	2 Q	Unified Team; W 3–1	Brazil; L 1–3	Bronze medal final Cuba; W 3–1	3rd place, bronze medalist(s)
United States women	Women's tournament	Japan; L 2–3	Unified Team; W 3–2	Spain; W 3–0	—N/a		2 Q	Netherlands; W 3–1	Cuba; L 2–3	Bronze medal final Brazil; W 3–0	3rd place, bronze medalist(s)

=== Men's tournament ===
Roster

The following volleyball players represented the United States:

- Nick Becker
- Carlos Briceno
- Bob Ctvrtlik
- Scott Fortune
- Dan Greenbaum
- Brent Hilliard
- Bryan Ivie
- Doug Partie
- Bob Samuelson
- Eric Sato
- Jeff Stork
- Steve Timmons

Preliminary round

Pos	Team	Pld	W	L	Pts	SW	SL	SR	SPW	SPL	SPR	Qualification
1	Italy	5	4	1	9	13	5	2.600	253	192	1.318	Quarterfinals
2	United States	5	4	1	9	13	8	1.625	287	257	1.117	Quarterfinals
3	Spain	5	3	2	8	11	12	0.917	283	299	0.946	Quarterfinals
4	Japan	5	2	3	7	10	12	0.833	277	291	0.952	Quarterfinals
5	Canada	5	1	4	6	10	12	0.833	286	279	1.025	9th place match
6	France	5	1	4	6	6	14	0.429	200	268	0.746	11th place match

26 July 1992	Japan	3–1	United States
26 July 1992	(8–15, 15–11, 15–10, 15–13)

28 July 1992	United States	3–2	Canada
28 July 1992	(15–12, 15–12, 10–15, 11–15, 16–14)

30 July 1992	United States	3–2	Spain
30 July 1992	(15–6, 14–16, 12–15, 15–10, 15–11)

1 August 1992	United States	3–0	France
1 August 1992	(15–5, 15–12, 15–8)

3 August 1992	United States	3–1	Italy
3 August 1992	(9–15, 16–14, 15–11, 15–13)

Quarterfinal

5 August 1992	United States	3–1	Unified Team
5 August 1992	(12–15, 15–10, 15–4, 15–11)

Semifinal

7 August 1992	United States	1–3	Brazil
7 August 1992	(15–12, 8–15, 9–15, 12–15)

Bronze medal match

9 August 1992	Cuba	1–3	United States
9 August 1992	(15–12, 13–15, 7–15, 11–15)

=== Women's tournament ===
Roster

- Head Coach: Terry Liskevych

#	Name	Date of Birth	Height	Weight	Spike	Block
1	Tonya Sanders	28.03.1968
2	Yoko Zetterlund	24.03.1969
4	Kim Oden	16.05.1964
5	Lori Endicott	01.08.1967
6	Paula Weishoff	01.05.1962
7	Caren Kemner	16.04.1965
8	Tammy Webb-Liley	06.03.1965
9	Elaina Oden	21.03.1967
12	Janet Cobbs	22.02.1967
13	Tara Cross-Battle	16.09.1968
14	Liane Sato	09.09.1964
15	Ruth Lawanson	27.09.1963

Preliminary round

Pos	Team	Pld	W	L	Pts	SW	SL	SR	SPW	SPL	SPR	Qualification
1	Unified Team	3	2	1	5	8	3	2.667	158	101	1.564	Semifinals
2	United States	3	2	1	5	8	5	1.600	171	153	1.118	Quarterfinals
3	Japan	3	2	1	5	6	5	1.200	146	127	1.150	Quarterfinals
4	Spain	3	0	3	3	0	9	0.000	41	135	0.304	7th place match

29 July 1992	United States	2–3	Japan
29 July 1992	(15–13, 11–15, 12–15, 15–8, 13–15); Report

31 July 1992	United States	3–2	Unified Team
31 July 1992	(9–15, 17–15, 15–12, 4–15, 15–11); Report

2 August 1992	Spain	0–3	United States
2 August 1992	(4–15, 5–15, 10–15); Report

Quarterfinal

4 August 1992	United States	3–1	Netherlands
4 August 1992	(15–11, 11–15, 15–8, 15–7); Report

Semifinal

6 August 1992	United States	2–3	Cuba
6 August 1992	(15–8, 9–15, 15–6, 5–15, 11–15); Report

Bronze-medal match

8 August 1992	Brazil	0–3	United States
8 August 1992	(8–15, 6–15, 13–15); Report

== Water polo ==
Summary

Team	Event	Preliminary round						Semifinal	Final / BM	
Team	Event	Opposition Result	Opposition Result	Opposition Result	Opposition Result	Opposition Result	Rank	Opposition Result	Opposition Result	Rank
United States men	Men's tournament	Australia; W 8–4	Czechoslovakia; W 9–3	France; W 11–7	Unified Team; L 5–8	Germany; W 7–2	2 Q	Spain; L 4–6	Bronze medal game Unified Team; L 4–8	4

Roster
The following players represented the United States:

- Jeff Campbell
- Christopher Duplanty
- Mike Evans
- Kirk Everist
- Erich Fischer
- Charles Harris
- Chris Humbert
- Douglas Kimbell
- Craig Klass
- Alex Rousseau
- Terry Schroeder
- John Vargas
- Craig Wilson

Preliminary round

Pos	Team	Pld	W	D	L	GF	GA	GD	Pts
1	Unified Team	5	5	0	0	50	32	+18	10
2	United States	5	4	0	1	40	24	+16	8
3	Australia	5	2	1	2	44	41	+3	5
4	Germany	5	1	2	2	38	41	−3	4
5	France	5	1	1	3	38	42	−4	3
6	Czechoslovakia	5	0	0	5	33	63	−30	0

1 August 1992	Australia	4–8	United States	Piscina Municipal de Montjuïc

2 August 1992	Czechoslovakia	3–9	United States	Piscina Municipal de Montjuïc

3 August 1992	United States	11–7	France	Piscina Municipal de Montjuïc

5 August 1992	United States	5–8	Unified team	Piscina Municipal de Montjuïc

6 August 1992	United States	7–2	Germany	Piscina Municipal de Montjuïc

Semifinal

8 August 1992	United States	4–6	Spain	Piscina Municipal de Montjuïc

Bronze medal game

9 August 1992	United States	4–8	Unified Team	Piscina Municipal de Montjuïc

== Weightlifting ==
Athlete	Event	Snatch		Clean & jerk		Total	
Athlete	Event	Weight	Rank	Weight	Rank	Weight	Rank
Bryan Jacob	–60 kg	117.5	=14	145.0	=16	262.5	19
Tim McRae	–67.5 kg	135.0	=6	162.5	8	297.5	8
Vernon Patao	–67.5 kg	132.5	8	157.5	=13	290.0	10
Tony Urrutia	–82.5 kg	150.0	18	190.0	=12	340.0	17
Brett Brian	–90 kg	150.0	=13	187.5	=11	337.5	13
Wes Barnett	–100 kg	157.5	17	195.0	14	352.5	15
David Langon	–100 kg	NM		Did not advance		DNF	
Rich Schutz	–110 kg	155.0	=21	192.5	=15	347.5	18
Mark Henry	+110 kg	165.0	=12	212.5	9	377.5	10
Mario Martinez	+110 kg	170.0	=7	215.0	8	385.0	8

== Wrestling ==
Key:

- TO – Victory by fall.
- PP – Decision by points – the loser with technical points.
- PO – Decision by points – the loser without technical points.
- ST – Technical superiority – a margin of victory of at least 15 points.
- EF – Decision by withdrawal
- D2 – Both wrestlers disqualified for passivity
- VA – Victory by injury
- Q – Qualify to gold medal bout
- q – Qualify to bronze medal bout

Athlete	Event	Pool stage							Final / BM / Pl.	
Athlete	Event	Opposition Result	Opposition Result	Opposition Result	Opposition Result	Opposition Result	Opposition Result	Rank	Opposition Result	Rank
Tim Vanni	Freestyle 48 kg	Pangelinan (GUM); W 4–0^{ST}	Chen (CHN); W 3–1^{PP}	Rahmati (IRI); W 3–1^{PP}	Petryshen (CAN); W 3–0^{PO}	Raşovan (ROU); L 1–3^{PP}	Kim (KOR); L 1–3^{PP}	3	5th place final Heugabel (GER); W 3–0^{PP}	5
Zeke Jones	Freestyle 52 kg	Boudchiche (TUN); W 4–0^{ST}	Levya (CUB); W 4–0^{ST}	Corduneanu (ROM); W 3–0^{PO}	Bye	Sato (JPN); W 3–1^{PP}	Kim (KOR); W 3–1^{PP}	1 Q	Ri (PRK); L 1–3^{PP}	2nd place, silver medalist(s)
Kendall Cross	Freestyle 57 kg	Dawson (CAN); W 3–1^{PP}	Okuyama (JPN); W 4–0^{TO}	Mallah (IRI); W 3–1^{PP}	Musaoğlu (TUR); L 1–3^{PP}	Bye	Puerto (CUB); L 1–3^{PP}	3	5th place final Pavlov (BUL); L 0–4^{TO}	6
John Smith	Freestyle 62 kg	Faikoğlu (TUR); W 3–1^{PP}	Kim (PRK); W 3–1^{PP}	Polky (GER); W 3–0^{PO}	Azizov (EUN); W 4–0^{ST}	Reinoso (CUB); L 1–3^{PP}	—N/a	1 Q	Mohammadian (IRI); W 3–0^{PO}	1st place, gold medalist(s)
Townsend Saunders	Freestyle 68 kg	McNeil (GBR); W 3–0^{PO}	Fadzayev (EUN); L 1–3^{PP}	Oziti (NGR); W 4–0^{TO}	Özbaş (TUR); L 1–3^{PP}	Did not advance	—N/a	4	7th place final Wilson (CAN); W 3–1^{PP}	7
Kenny Monday	Freestyle 74 kg	Revický (TCH); W 3–0^{PP}	Bye	Ho (CHN); W 3–0^{PO}	Gadzhiev (EUN); W 3–0^{PO}	Walencik (POL); W 3–0^{PO}	—N/a	1 Q	Park (KOR); L 0–3^{PO}	2nd place, silver medalist(s)
Kevin Jackson	Freestyle 82 kg	Öztürk (TUR); W 3–0^{PO}	Kostecki (POL); W 3–1^{PP}	Hohl (CAN); W 3–1^{PP}	Iglesias (ESP); W 3–0^{PO}	Khadem (IRI); W 3–1^{PP}	—N/a	1 Q	Zhabrailov (EUN); W 3–0^{PO}	1st place, gold medalist(s)
Chris Campbell	Freestyle 90 kg	Khadartsev (EUN); L 0–3^{PO}	Park (NZL); W 4–0^{ST}	Ota (JPN); W 3–0^{PO}	Bye	Limonata (CUB); W 3–1^{PP}	—N/a	2 q	Bronze medal final Sükhbat (MGL); W 3–1^{PP}	3rd place, bronze medalist(s)
Mark Coleman	Freestyle 100 kg	Carrow (CAN); W 3–1^{PP}	Bye	Kim (KOR); L 0–3^{PO}	Verma (IND); W 3–1^{PP}	Balz (GER); L 0–3^{PO}	—N/a	4	7th place final Kiss (HUN); W 3–0^{PP}	7
Bruce Baumgartner	Freestyle 130 kg	Barbutov (BUL); W 3–1^{PP}	Gombos (HUN); W 3–0^{PO}	Gobejishvili (EUN); W 3–0^{PO}	Wang (CHN); W 4–0^{TO}	Schröder (GER); W 3–0^{PO}	—N/a	1 Q	Thue (CAN); W 3–0^{PO}	1st place, gold medalist(s)
Mark Fuller	Greco-Roman 48 kg	Sánchez (CUB); L 0–3^{PO}	Zagranitchni (ISR); W 3–1^{PP}	Dăscălescu (ROU); L 0–4^{TO}	Did not advance			7	Did not advance	
Shawn Sheldon	Greco-Roman 52 kg	Tango (MAR); W 3–0^{PO}	Rønningen (NOR); L 0–3^{PO}	Rizvanović (IOP); W 3–1^{PP}	Tsenov (BUL); W 3–1^{PP}	—N/a		2 q	Bronze medal final Min (KOR); L 0–4^{VA}	4
Dennis Hall	Greco-Roman 57 kg	Mourier (FRA); L 0–3^{PO}	Šukevičius (LTU); W 3–1^{PP}	Dimitrov (BUL); W 4–0^{TO}	Ignatenko (EUN); L 1–3^{PP}	Did not advance	—N/a	4	7th place final Pehkonen (FIN); L 1–3^{PP}	8
Buddy Lee	Greco-Roman 62 kg	Dietsch (SUI); L 1–3^{PP}	Khdar (MAR); W 4–0^{ST}	Nishiguchi (JPN); W 3–1^{PP}	Büttner (GER); W 4–0^{EF}	Martynov (EUN); L 0–4^{TO}	—N/a	3	5th place final Bódi (HUN); L 0–4^{EF}	6
Rodney Smith	Greco-Roman 68 kg	Villuela (ESP); W 3–1^{PP}	Bye	Baranov (ISR); W 4–0^{TO}	Yeats (CAN); W 3–1^{PP}	Repka (HUN); L 0–3^{PO}	Yalouz (FRA); W 3–1^{PP}	2 q	Bronze medal final Rodríguez (CUB); W 3–1^{PP}	3rd place, bronze medalist(s)
Travis West	Greco-Roman 74 kg	Iskandaryan (EUN); L 1–3^{PP}	Kasap (CAN); L 1–3^{PP}	Did not advance				7	Did not advance	
Dan Henderson	Greco-Roman 82 kg	Ramadan (EGY); W 3–0^{PO}	Mischler (FRA); W 3–1^{PP}	Kasum (IOP); L 0–3^{PO}	Farkas (HUN); L 0–3^{PO}	Zander (GER); L 0–3^{PO}	Did not advance	5	9th place final Martinetti (SUI); L 1–3^{PP}	10
Michial Foy	Greco-Roman 90 kg	Campanella (ITA); W 3–1^{PP}	Ivošević (IOP); W 3–1^{PP}	Meiss (FRA); W 4–0^{TO}	Koguashvili (EUN); L 1–3^{PP}	Başar (TUR); L 1–3^{PP}	—N/a	3	5th place final Babak (IRI); L 0–4^{ST}	6
Dennis Koslowski	Greco-Roman 100 kg	Wroński (POL); W 3–0^{PO}	Song (KOR); W 3–0^{PO}	Ieremciuc (ROU); W 3–0^{PO}	Hallik (EST); W 3–0^{PO}	Bye	—N/a	1 Q	Milián (CUB); L 1–3^{PP}	2nd place, silver medalist(s)
Matt Ghaffari	Greco-Roman 130 kg	Gerovski (BUL); T 0–0^{D2}	Johansson (SWE); L 0–3^{PO}	Did not advance		—N/a		8	Did not advance	

== See also ==
- United States at the 1991 Pan American Games
