= Uileacu =

Uileacu may refer to several places in Romania:

- Uileacu de Beiuș is a commune in Bihor County
- Uileacu Şimleului, a village in Măeriște commune, Sălaj County
- Uileacu de Criş, a village in Tileagd commune, Bihor County
- Uileacu de Munte, a village in Paleu commune, Bihor County
