= Bertrand Damaisin =

French judoka (born 1968)

Personal information
- Born: 27 October 1968 (age 57)
- Occupation: Judoka

Sport
- Country: France
- Sport: Judo
- Weight class: –‍78 kg

Achievements and titles
- Olympic Games: (bronze) (1992)
- European Champ.: (bronze) (1992)
Medal record
Men's judo
Representing France
Olympic Games
Bronze medal – third place	1992 Barcelona	‍–‍78 kg
European Championships
Bronze medal – third place	1992 Paris	‍–‍78 kg

Profile at external databases
- IJF: 53556
- JudoInside.com: 349
- Updated on 5 June 2023

Bertrand Damaisin (born 27 October 1968 in Lyon, Rhône) is a retired judoka from France. He claimed a bronze medal in the Men's Light-Middleweight (‍–‍78 kg) division at the 1992 Summer Olympics in Barcelona, Spain. In the bronze medal match he defeated Sweden's Lars Adolfsson.
