= Yahia Gregni =

Libyan judoka (born 1970)

Personal information
- Nationality: Libyan
- Born: 10 February 1970 (age 55)

Sport
- Sport: Judo

Yahia Gregni (born 10 February 1970) is a Libyan judoka. He competed in the men's half-middleweight event at the 1992 Summer Olympics.
