= Arman (Crișul Negru) =

- Location within Romania

Location
- Country: Romania
- Counties: Bihor County

Physical characteristics
- Mouth: Crișul Negru
  - location: Upstream of Uileacu de Beiuș
  - coordinates: 46.6728°N 22.2329°E
- Length: 8.5 km (5.3 mi)
- Basin size: 8.3 km^{2} (3.2 sq mi)

Basin features
- Progression: Crișul Negru→ Körös→ Tisza→ Danube→ Black Sea

The Arman is a left tributary of the river Crișul Negru in Romania. Its length is 8.5 km (5.3 mi) and its basin size is 8.3 km^{2} (3.2 sq mi). It discharges into the Crișul Negru near Uileacu de Beiuș.
