= Ryan Birch =

British judoka (1969–2013)

Personal information
- Nationality: British (English)
- Born: 5 April 1969 Kingston upon Hull, England
- Died: 19 March 2013 (aged 43) The Bahamas
- Occupation: Judoka

Sport
- Sport: Judo
- Weight class: middleweight half-middleweight
Medal record
Representing Great Britain
European Championships
Gold medal – first place	1994 Gdansk	78 kg
Bronze medal – third place	1996 The Hague	86 kg

Profile at external databases
- JudoInside.com: 2269

Ryan Birch (5 April 1969 – 19 March 2013) was a British judoka, representing Great Britain in two Olympic Games.

== Biography ==
Birch was born in Kingston upon Hull. In 1991, he won the first of his two championships of Great Britain, winning the half-middleweight division at the British Judo Championships. The following year he was selected by Great Britain for the 1992 Summer Olympics in Barcelona, where he competed in the men's 78 kg event.

In 1994, he won the gold medal at the 1994 European Judo Championships in Gdańsk, Poland. In 1996, he was selected to represent Great Britain at the 1996 Summer Olympics in Atlanta, Georgia, where he competed in the men's 86 kg event.

In 1998, he became a champion of Great Britain for the second time after winning the title at the heavier weight class of middleweight.

He married Rowena Sweatman (who also won the European judo gold medal in 1994) and had two children. On retiring from sport, he went on to become a pilot.He was killed in a road accident in The Bahamas.

== Achievements ==
Year	Tournament	Place	Weight class
1999	European Judo Championships	3rd	Middleweight (86 kg)
2000	European Judo Championships	5th	Half middleweight (78 kg)
2001	European Judo Championships	1st	Half middleweight (78 kg)
