= Ahmed Al-Shiekh =

Yemeni judoka (born 1964)

Personal information
- Born: 11 May 1964 (age 60)

Sport
- Country: Yemen
- Sport: Judo

Ahmed Al-Shiekh (born 11 May 1964) is a Yemeni judoka. He competed internationally for Yemen at the 1992 Summer Olympics.

== Career ==
Ahmed Al-Shiekh competed in the half middleweight class at the 1992 Summer Olympics in Barcelona, Spain, in the first round he was drawn against Davaasambuugiin Dorjbat from Mongolia in which he lost and didn't advance to the next round.
