= Anton Summer =

Austrian judoka (born 1967)

Personal information
- Nationality: Austrian
- Born: 23 November 1967 (age 58) Vienna, Austria
- Occupation: Judoka

Sport
- Sport: Judo

Profile at external databases
- JudoInside.com: 7548

Anton Summer (born 23 November 1967) is an Austrian judoka. He competed in the men's half-middleweight event at the 1992 Summer Olympics.
