= Freyr Gauti Sigmundsson =

Icelandic judoka (born 1972)

Personal information
- Nationality: Icelandic
- Born: 17 January 1972 (age 53)

Sport
- Sport: Judo

Freyr Gauti Sigmundsson (born 17 January 1972) is an Icelandic judoka. He competed in the men's half-middleweight event at the 1992 Summer Olympics.
