= Abdul Kader Dabo =

Malian judoka (born 1970)

Personal information
- Nationality: Malian
- Born: 22 July 1970 (age 54)
- Occupation: Judoka

Sport
- Sport: Judo

Profile at external databases
- JudoInside.com: 9042

Abdul Kader Dabo (born 22 July 1970) is a Malian judoka. He competed in the men's half-middleweight event at the 1992 Summer Olympics.
