= Marko Haanpää =

Finnish judoka

Personal information
- Nationality: Finnish
- Born: 23 September 1966 (age 58); Tampere, Finland

Sport
- Sport: Judo

Marko Haanpää (born 23 September 1966) is a Finnish judoka. He competed in the men's half-middleweight event at the 1992 Summer Olympics.
