= Jean-Jacques Rakotomalala =

Malagasy judoka

Personal information
- Nationality: Malagasy
- Born: 3 January 1965 (age 61)

Sport
- Sport: Judo
Medal record
Representing Madagascar
Men's judo
African Championships
Bronze medal – third place	1996 South Africa	-78 kg

Jean-Jacques Rakotomalala (born 3 January 1965) is a Malagasy judoka. He competed in the men's half-middleweight event at the 1992 Summer Olympics.
