= Moshe Pennavayre =

Ivorian judoka

Personal information
- Nationality: Ivorian
- Born: 25 October 1971 (age 53)

Sport
- Sport: Judo

Moshe Pennavayre (born 25 October 1971) is an Ivorian judoka. He competed in the men's half-middleweight event at the 1992 Summer Olympics.
