= Zsolt Zsoldos =

Hungarian judoka

Personal information
- Nationality: Hungarian
- Born: 14 February 1967 Pécs, Hungary
- Died: 5 July 1996 (aged 29) Kecskemét, Hungary

Sport
- Sport: Judo

Zsolt Zsoldos (14 February 1967 – 5 July 1996) was a Hungarian judoka. He competed in the men's half-middleweight event at the 1992 Summer Olympics. Zsoldos died in a car accident near Kecskemét in July 1996, aged 29.
