= Eric Bustos =

Bolivian judoka

Personal information
- Nationality: Bolivian
- Born: 4 April 1970 (age 54)

Sport
- Sport: Judo

Eric Bustos (born 4 April 1970) is a Bolivian judoka. He competed in the men's half-middleweight event at the 1992 Summer Olympics.
