= Daniel Lascau =

German judoka (born 1969)

Personal information
- Nationality: German
- Born: 15 May 1969 (age 56) Oradea, Romania
- Occupation: Judoka

Sport
- Sport: Judo

Profile at external databases
- IJF: 53621
- JudoInside.com: 2178

Daniel Lascau (born 15 May 1969) is a former World Champion German judoka. He won the 1991 World Championship at Under 78kg in 1991. He competed in the men's half-middleweight event at the 1992 Summer Olympics.
