= Jean Alix Holmand =

Haitian judoka

Personal information
- Nationality: Haitian
- Born: 10 August 1966 (age 58)

Sport
- Sport: Judo

Jean Alix Holmand (born 10 August 1966) is a Haitian judoka. He competed in the men's half-middleweight event at the 1992 Summer Olympics.
