= João de Souza =

Angolan judoka

Personal information
- Nationality: Angolan
- Born: 28 August 1973 (age 51)

Sport
- Sport: Judo

João de Souza (born 28 August 1973) is an Angolan judoka. He competed in the men's half-middleweight event at the 1992 Summer Olympics.
