= Khristodoulos Katsinioridis =

Cypriot judoka (born 1969)

Personal information
- Nationality: Cypriot
- Born: 24 November 1969 (age 55)
- Occupation: Judoka

Sport
- Sport: Judo

Khristodoulos Katsinioridis (born 24 November 1969) is a Cypriot judoka. He competed in the men's half-middleweight event at the 1992 Summer Olympics.
