= Săliște (Crișul Negru) =

- Location within Romania

Location
- Country: Romania
- Counties: Bihor County
- Villages: Forău, Urviș de Beiuș

Physical characteristics
- Source: Fânaț Hill, Forău
  - coordinates: 46°43′45″N 22°13′12″E
  - elevation: 266 m (873 ft)
- Mouth: Crișul Negru
  - location: Urviș de Beiuș
  - coordinates: 46°40′48″N 22°09′18″E
  - elevation: 147 m (482 ft)
- Length: 8 km (5.0 mi)
- Basin size: 22 km^{2} (8.5 sq mi)

Basin features
- Progression: Crișul Negru→ Körös→ Tisza→ Danube→ Black Sea

The Săliște is a right tributary of the river Crișul Negru in Romania. It discharges into the Crișul Negru in Urviș de Beiuș. Its length is 8 km (5.0 mi) and its basin size is 22 km^{2} (8.5 sq mi).
