= Krzysztof Kamiński (judoka) =

Polish judoka

Personal information
- Nationality: Polish
- Born: 11 September 1963 (age 61); Gdańsk, Poland

Sport
- Sport: Judo

Krzysztof Kamiński (born 11 September 1963) is a Polish judoka. He competed in the men's half-middleweight event at the 1992 Summer Olympics.
