= Amadou Guèye =

Senegalese judoka

Personal information
- Nationality: Senegalese
- Born: 10 November 1964
- Died: 4 December 2014 (aged 50)

Sport
- Sport: Judo

Amadou Diop Guèye (10 November 1964 – 4 December 2014) was a Senegalese judoka. He competed in the men's half-middleweight event at the 1992 Summer Olympics.
