= Anthonie Wurth =

Dutch judoka (born 1967)

Personal information
- Nationality: Dutch
- Born: 26 May 1967 (age 57); Smallingerland, Netherlands

Sport
- Sport: Judo

Anthonie Wurth (born 26 May 1967) is a Dutch judoka. He competed in the men's half-middleweight event at the 1992 Summer Olympics.
