= Alexandru Ciupe =

Romanian judoka

Personal information
- Nationality: Romanian
- Born: 18 March 1972 (age 53); Uileacu de Beiuș, Romania
- Occupation: Judoka

Sport
- Sport: Judo

Profile at external databases
- JudoInside.com: 3285

Alexandru Ciupe (born 18 March 1972) is a Romanian judoka. He competed at the 1992 Summer Olympics and the 1996 Summer Olympics.
