= António Matias =

Portuguese judoka

Personal information
- Full name: António Eduardo Castanho Matias
- Born: 10 April 1963 Lisbon, Portugal
- Died: 3 January 2008 (aged 44) Lapa, Lisbon, Portugal
- Height: 180 cm (5 ft 11 in)
- Weight: 77 kg (170 lb)

António Eduardo Castanho Matias (Note: This name uses Portuguese naming customs: the first or maternal family name is Castanho and the second or paternal family name is Matias.) (Lisbon, Portugal, 10 April 1963 – 3 January 2008) was a Portuguese judoka.

After retiring he became a coach for Nuno Delgado and Telma Monteiro, among others.

== Achievements ==
Year	Tournament	Place	Weight class
1990	European Judo Championships	7th	Half middleweight (78 kg)
