= Sharip Varayev =

Russian judoka

Personal information
- Nationality: Russian
- Born: 13 August 1969 (age 55); Grozny, Russia

Sport
- Sport: Judo

Sharip Varayev (born 13 August 1969) is a Russian judoka. He competed in the men's half-middleweight event at the 1992 Summer Olympics.
