= Olivier Schaffter =

Swiss judoka (born 1964)

Personal information
- Nationality: Swiss
- Born: 7 October 1964 (age 60)

Sport
- Sport: Judo

Olivier Schaffter (born 7 October 1964) is a Swiss judoka. He competed at the 1988 Summer Olympics and the 1992 Summer Olympics.
