= Ezequiel Paraguassu =

Brazilian judoka

Ezequiel Rodrigues Dutra Paraguassu (November 4, 1963) is a Brazilian judoka. He competed at the 1988 Seoul and 1992 Summer Olympics. He is particularly well known for the use of the sode guruma jime (sleeve choke), widely known as the Ezequiel or Ezekiel choke (Portuguese: estrangulamento de Ezequiel), named after him by stylists of Brazilian jiu-jitsu.
