= Fadi Saikali =

Lebanese judoka

Personal information
- Nationality: Lebanese
- Born: 18 August 1969 (age 55)

Sport
- Sport: Judo

Fadi Saikali (born 18 August 1969) is a Lebanese judoka. He competed at the 1988 Summer Olympics and the 1992 Summer Olympics.
