= Davaasambuugiin Dorjbat =

Mongolian judoka (born 1970)

Personal information
- Nationality: Mongolia
- Born: 19 November 1970 (age 55)

Sport
- Sport: Judo
Medal record
Men's Judo
Representing Mongolia
Asian Championships
Silver medal – second place	1993 Macau	–95 kg
Bronze medal – third place	1991 Osaka	–78 kg

Davaasambuugiin Dorjbat (born 19 November 1970) is a Mongolian judoka. He competed in the men's half-middleweight event at the 1992 Summer Olympics.
