= M'Bairo Abakar =

Chadian judoka (born 1961)

M'Bairo Abakar (born January 13, 1961) is a judoka who competed internationally for Chad.

Abakar represented Chad at the 1992 Summer Olympics in Barcelona in the half-middleweight (-78 kg) category, he received a bye in the first round, but they lost to Jason Morris in the second round, therefore he did not advance any further.
