= Uileacu de Beiuș =

- Commune
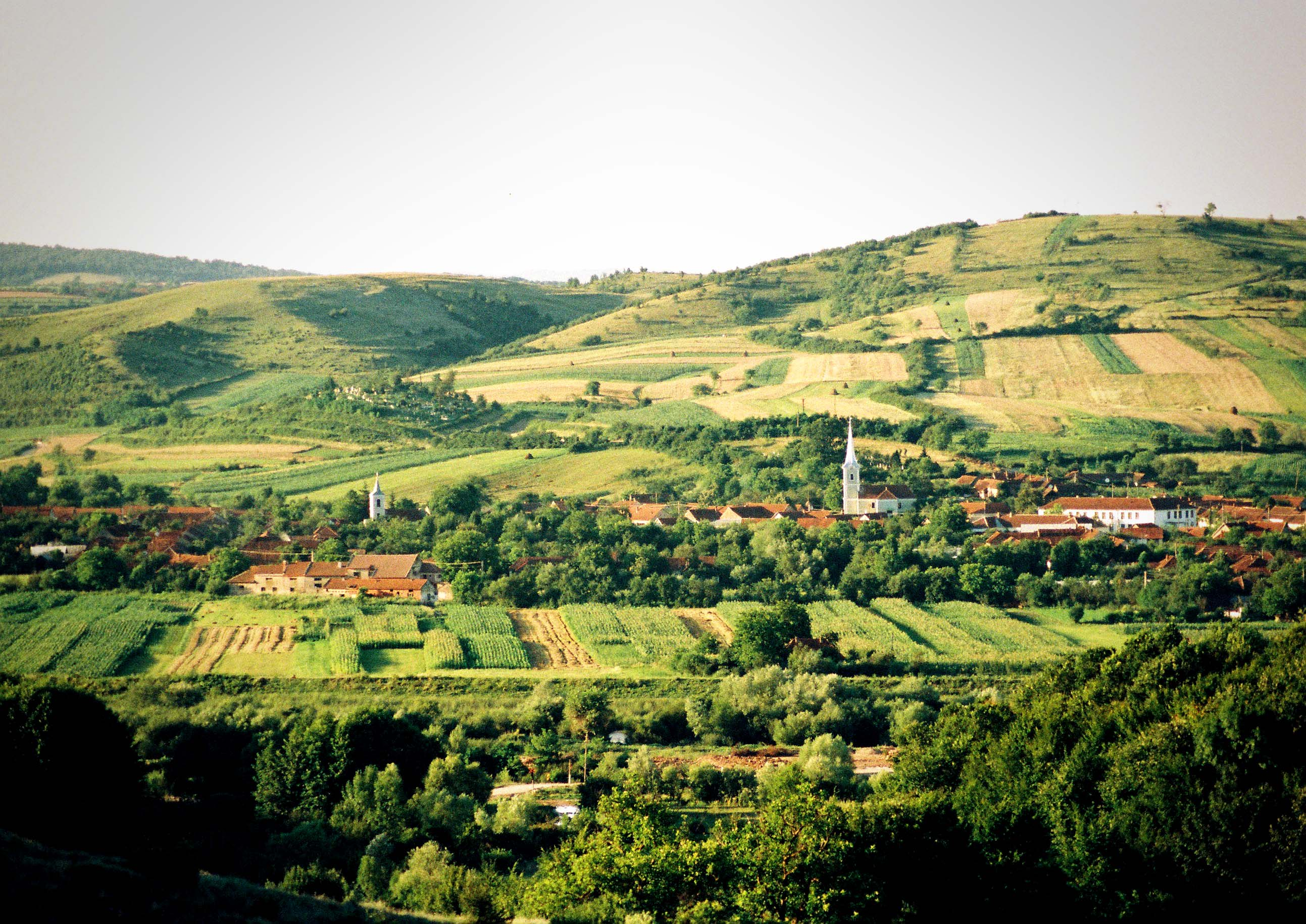
- Uileacu de Beiuș village

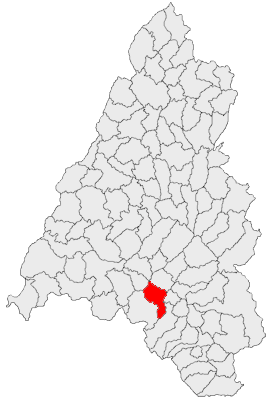
- Location in Bihor County

- Location in Romania
- Coordinates: 46.6833°N 22.2333°E
- Country: Romania
- County: Bihor

Government
  - Mayor (2020–2024): Gheorghe Cuciula (PSD)
- Area: 43.82 km^{2} (16.92 sq mi)
- Elevation: 162 m (531 ft)
- Population (2021-12-01): 1,793
  - Density: 40.92/km^{2} (106.0/sq mi)
- Time zone: UTC+02:00 (EET)
  - Summer (DST): UTC+03:00 (EEST)
- Postal code: 417610
- Area code: +(40) x59
- Vehicle reg.: BH
- Website: www.uileacudebeius.ro

Uileacu de Beiuș (Hungarian: Belényesújlak) is a commune in Bihor County, Crișana, Romania. It is composed of four villages: Forău (Belényesforró), Prisaca (Gyepüpataka), Vălanii de Beiuș (Belényesvalány), and Uileacu de Beiuș.

The commune is situated amid rolling hills, at an altitude of 162 m (531 ft), on the banks of the river Crișul Negru and its tributaries, the Arman and the Săliște. It is located in the southern part of Bihor County, 13 km (8.1 mi) west of the city of Beiuș and 55 km (34 mi) southeast of the county seat, Oradea.

At the 2021 census, Uileacu de Beiuș had a population of 1,793; of those, 80.31% were Romanians, 14.56% Hungarians, and 1.34% Roma.

== Natives ==
- Alexandru Ciupe (born 1972), judoka
