= Jason Morris =

American judoka

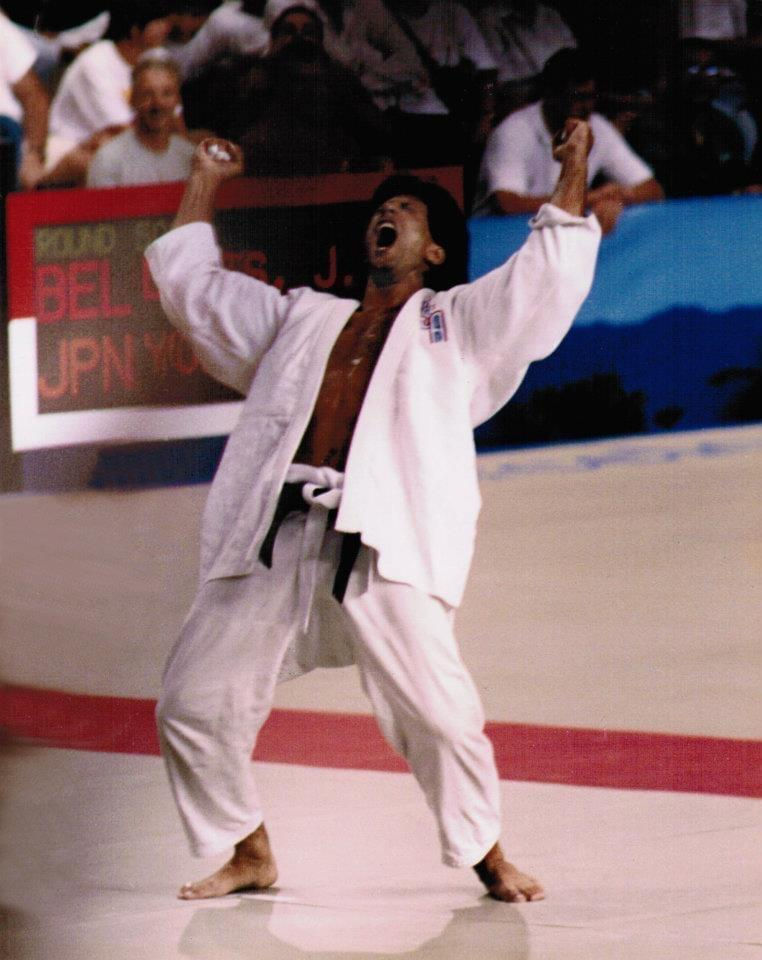

Personal information
- Full name: Jason Newth Morris
- Born: February 3, 1967 (age 59) Schenectady, New York
- Home town: Glenville, New York
- Education: Syracuse University
- Occupation: Judo Instructor
- Website: www.realjudo.net

Sport
- Country: United States
- Sport: Judo
- Weight class: ‍–‍78 kg
- Rank: 8th dan black belt
- Club: NYAC
- Now coaching: Jason Morris Judo Center

Achievements and titles
- Olympic Games: (silver) (1992)
- World Champ.: (bronze) (1993)
Medal record
Men's judo
Representing United States
Olympic Games
Silver medal – second place	1992 Barcelona	‍–‍78 kg
World Championships
Bronze medal – third place	1993 Hamilton	‍–‍78 kg
Pan American Games
Gold medal – first place	1987 Indianapolis	‍–‍78 kg
Gold medal – first place	1991 Havana	‍–‍78 kg
Silver medal – second place	1995 Mara del Plata	‍–‍78 kg
World Juniors Championships
Bronze medal – third place	1986 Rome	‍–‍78 kg

Profile at external databases
- IJF: 1514
- JudoInside.com: 3582
- Updated on 5 June 2023

Jason Newth Morris (born February 3, 1967) is an American retired judoka. He was a four-time Olympian and 2008 Olympic Coach, best known for winning the silver medal in the ‍–‍78 kg weight category in the 1992 Summer Olympics and a Bronze Medal in the 1993 World Judo Championships. He is a Hachidan (8th Degree Black Belt) his favorite techniques are Uchi Mata, Tai Otoshi, and his "Sticker or Sticky Foot" (AKA Kosotogari). He was also an NCAA Division I All-American wrestler and 2x EIWA conference champion at Syracuse University.

== Achievements ==
Morris was the Silver Medallist at -78 kg in the 1992 Summer Olympics, and was also a Bronze Medalist at the 1993 World Judo Championships. Morris represented the United States in four Olympic Games 1988, 1992, 1996, 2000 & was Team USA Olympic Coach at the 2008 Games.

=== National honors ===
- 2010 – Elected to USJF Hall of Fame
- 2008 – Named Olympic Coach for 2008 Summer Olympics
- 2008 – Elected to USA Judo Hall of Fame
- 2007 USOC "Development Coach of the Year" (Judo)
- 2006, 2005 & 2003 "Coach of the Year" Real Judo Magazine
- 2006 USOC "Coach of the Year" (Judo)
- 2003 "International Jr. Female Coach of the Year" USJF
- 1998 – Elected to NYAC Hall of Fame
- 1993 – New York Athletic Club "Athlete of the Year"
- 1993 & 1992 – USOC "Athlete of the Year" (Judo)
- 6x National Champion (89, 90, 91, 92, 93 & 99)
- 8x National Junior Champion
- 3x Outstanding Judoka of the Year

=== Gold major international medals ===
- 99, 93 & 89 US Open – Colorado Springs, CO
- 91 Pan Am Games – Havana, Cuba
- 90 Tbilisi International – Tbilisi, Georgia (Only winner from North & South America)
- 90 & 89 Guido Sieni – Sassari, Italy
- 88 Czech Open – Prague, Czech Republic
- 88 Ontario Open – Toronto, Canada
- 87 Austrian Open – Leonding, Austria
- 87 Pacific Rim Championships -Colorado Springs, CO, USA
- 87 Pan Am Games – Indianapolis, IN, USA
- 87 & 85 Jr. Pan Am Championships – Mexico City, Mexico
- 86, 85 & 84 New York Open – Manhattan, NY
- 85 & 84 Quebec Open – Montreal, QC
- 81 Mexico International (65 kg) -Mexico City, Mexico

=== Silver major international medals ===
- 95 Pan Am Games – Mar de Plata, Argentina
- 92 Olympic Games – Barcelona, Spain
- 92 Hungarian Open – Budapest, Hungary
- 91 Korean Open – Seoul, Korea
- 90, 87 & 85 US Open – Colorado Springs, CO
- 89 French Open – Paris, France
- 89 Pacific Rim Championships -Beijing, China
- 88 German Open – Russelsheim, Germany

=== Bronze major international medals ===
- 00 British Open – Birmingham, England
- 99 Rendez Vous Canada – Montreal, QC
- 95 US Open – Macon, GA
- 95, 90, 89 & 88 Hungarian Open – Budapest, Hungary
- 95 Pacific Rim Championships – Sydney, Australia
- 94, 88 & 86 US Open – Colorado Springs, CO
- 93 World Championships - Hamilton, Canada
- 91 Pacific Rim Championships – Honolulu, HI, USA
- 90 Kano Cup – Tokyo, Japan
- 90 Tre Torri – Porto Sant'Elpidio, Italy
- 89 Austrian Open – Leonding, Austria
- 88 Guido Sieni – Sassari, Italy
- 86 Jr. World Championships – Rome, Italy
- 86 Quebec Open – Montreal, QC

=== 5th place in major international events ===
- 95 French Open – Paris, France
- 92 & 90 Czech Open – Prague, Czech Republic
- 89 World Championships – Belgrade, Yugoslavia
- 87 World Championships – Essen, Germany

== Present ==
Since retiring from competitive judo after the 2000 Summer Olympics, Morris along with wife Teri own and operate the Jason Morris Judo Center in Glenville, New York

== Notable students ==
- Brad Bolen (Pan American Champion)
- Nick Kossor (National Champion)
- Nicholas Delpopolo (2x Olympian)
- Travis Stevens (Coached him to his first Olympics)

== See also ==
- Judo at the 1992 Summer Olympics
- 1993 Canada
