= Lars Adolfsson =

Swedish judoka (born 1965)

Personal information
- Full name: Lars Olof Melker Adolfsson
- Nationality: Swedish
- Born: 20 December 1965 (age 59); Rydboholm, Sweden
- Height: 1.83 m (6 ft 0 in)
- Weight: 81 kg (179 lb)

Sport
- Sport: Judo

Lars Olof Melker Adolfsson (born 20 December 1965) is a Swedish judoka. He competed in the 1988 and 1992 Summer Olympics.
