= Karen Fladset =

Norwegian handball player and coach (born 1944)

Personal information
- Nationality: Norwegian
- Born: 27 May 1944 (age 82) Borgund Municipality, Norway

Sport
- Sport: Handball

Senior clubs
- Years: Team
- –: SK Olymp
- 1970–1979: IL Vestar
National team
Years	Team	Apps	(Gls)
1962–1973	Norway	86	(251)

Teams managed
- 1970–1979: IL Vestar
- 1975–1976: Norway (assistant)
- 1982–1983: Norway
- –: Refstad IL
- –: Bækkelagets SK
- –: Toten HK

Karen Fladset (born 27 May 1944) is a Norwegian former team handball player and coach. She played for the club IL Vestar and the Norway women's national handball team. With Vestar she became Norwegian Champion both as player and coach, and she was top scorer in the Norwegian league for four seasons. After her playing career she was head coach for the national team for two years, and later coach for various clubs. She was a Norway champion in discus throw three times.

== Early life and career ==
Fladset was born in Borgund Municipality as the daughter of Olav Fladset (1905–1970) and Lillemor Hofset (1909–1992). She is the cousin of former Norwegian football player, Finn Seeman. She made her debut on the national handball team in 1962, 17 years old. She was educated as a gymnastics teacher at Norwegian School of Sport Sciences (then called Statens gymnastikkskole). Here she received a scholarship from 1970 to 1973, and wrote a thesis on handball tactics.

In the 1960s she also competed in athletics. She won the national championships in discus throw in 1962, 1966 and 1967, and achieved bronze medals in 1963 and 1968. Her winning result in 1962 of 36.13 metres was the worst winning result since 1949 (Norwegian championships for women were inaugurated in 1947). In 1966 and 1967 she won with 37.42 metres and 38.24 metres respectively. Her personal best throw was 39.84 metres, achieved in June 1967 on Frogner stadion. She represented SK Olymp until the mid-1960s, when she changed club to IL Vestar, and still has the club record in Olymp (now: IL Molde-Olymp), in both discus throw and high jump. She also had 5.52 metres in the long jump from 1966.

== 1970s ==
Fladset played team handball for the club IL Vestar, and from 1970 to 1979 she both coached and played for the club. Vestar won the national league eight years in a row, starting from the 1971/1972 season. The club also won the 1975 outdoor championship, and the national cup in 1976 and 1977. The club twice reached the semifinal of the European Champions Cup. Fladset was top scorer in the Norway league in the seasons 1974–75, 1975–76, 1976–77 and 1978–79, when she played for Vestar, and Vestar also won the national league these years. Fladset played 86 matches and scored 251 goals for the national team between 1962 and 1973, including participation at the 1971 World Women's Handball Championship in the Netherlands and the 1973 World Women's Handball Championship in Yugoslavia. During the 1975/1976 season Fladset was assistant coach for the national team, when Frode Kyvåg was head coach.

== 1980s ==
In 1975 to 1976 she was the assistant coach on the Norwegian national team under Frode Kyvåg.

Fladset became head coach for the national team from 1982, coaching the team to the 1982 World Women's Handball competition in Hungary. They placed seventh, the best performance to date of the team. The team lost to East Germany and Hungary, won against United States, Congo, Bulgaria and West Germany, and played even with Romania. At the qualification tournament in Poland in 1983 the Norway team failed to qualify for the 1984 Olympics. Fladset resigned as coach for the national team, and Sven-Tore Jacobsen took over in 1984, after a short period with Vinko Kandija as head coach. During the 1980s she was coach for the clubs Vestar, Refstad, Bækkelaget and Toten. Fladset was among the first coaches to introduce weight training for women. She increased the amount of training activity compared to earlier practice, and she focused on developing handball into a faster and more technical sport.

Fladset has worked as a teacher at the Norwegian School of Sport Sciences and at the Lambertseter secondary school. From 1985 she was an expert commentator for the Norwegian Broadcasting Corporation during handball championships, often together with radio sports reporter Unni Anisdahl.

Fladset is regarded as having had significant influence on improvement of Norway women's handball, as a long-term player, coach and commentator, including her role as coach for Marit Breivik, later successful head coach for the national team. In 1999 she was awarded the Handball Statuette by the Norwegian Handball Federation. In 2010, she was among the nominated for the award Egebergs Ærespris, for her achievements in team handball and athletics.

Sporting positions
Preceded by Otto Th. Pedersen	Norway women's national handball team head coach 1982–1983	Succeeded by Sven-Tore Jacobsen
