= Grethe Tønnesen =

Norwegian handball player

Personal information
- Nationality: Norwegian
- Born: 1946 (age 79–80)

Sport
- Sport: Handball
- Position: Back

Senior clubs
- Years: Team
- 1961–1969: Nordstrand IF
- 1969–1979: IL Vestar
National team
Years	Team	Apps	(Gls)
1968–1977	Norway	60	(39)

Grethe Tønnesen (born 1946) is a Norwegian handball player. She played 60 matches for the Norway women's national handball team between 1968 and 1977. She participated at the 1973 World Women's Handball Championship, where the Norwegian team placed 8th.

She played for Nordstrand IF until 1969, where she joined IL Vestar. Here she played for 10 seasons, winning the Norwegian Women's Handball Cup in 1976 and 1977. Later she was the player-coach for Lillestrøm.

She has later been a board member of the club Oppsal IF, where she is an honorary member. In 2019 she was awarded the 'innsatsprisen' (eng: commitment award) by the Norwegian Handball Federation for her work at the club.
