= Moldestad =

Moldestad is a surname. Notable people with the surname include:

- Kristine Moldestad (born 1969), Norwegian handball player
- Sigrid Moldestad (born 1972), Norwegian folk singer, musician, and instrumentalist
- Tormod Moldestad (born 1974), Norwegian handball player
