= Kari Aagaard =

Norwegian handball player

Personal information
- Nationality: Norwegian
- Born: July 28, 1951 (age 75) Hamar, Norway

Sport
- Sport: Handball

Senior clubs
- Years: Team
- –: Hamarkameratene
- 1972–1980: IL Vestar
National team
Years	Team	Apps	(Gls)
1973–1978	Norway	92	(54)

Kari Aagaard (née Reiersen born 1951) is a Norwegian handball player. She played 92 matches for the Norway women's national handball team between 1973 and 1978. She participated at the 1973 and 1975 World Women's Handball Championship.

Aagaard was awarded the Håndballstatuetten trophy from the Norwegian Handball Federation in 1999.

After retiring from playing she has worked in the Norwegian Handball Federation.
