= Sponberg =

Sponberg is a surname. Notable people with the surname include:

- Frank Sponberg (1913–2000), Australian rugby league footballer
- Nicol Sponberg (born 1970), American Christian singer
- Oddvar Sponberg (1914–1975), Norwegian race walker
- Svanhild Sponberg, Norwegian handball player
