= Keul =

Keul may refer to:

- KEUL, radio station in Alaska
- Keul, crater on Mars
- Katja Keul (born 1969), German politician
- Siri Keul (born 1948), Norwegian handball player

== See also ==
- Yvonne Keuls (1931–2025), Dutch writer
