= Astri =

Astri is a given name. Notable people with the name include:

- Astri Aas-Hansen (born 1970), Norwegian politician for the Labour Party
- Astri Knudsen Bech, Norwegian handball player
- Astri Rynning (1915–2006), Norwegian judge and politician
- Astri Taube (1898–1980), Swedish sculptor and artist
