= Else-Marthe Sørlie Lybekk =

Norwegian handball player (born 1978)

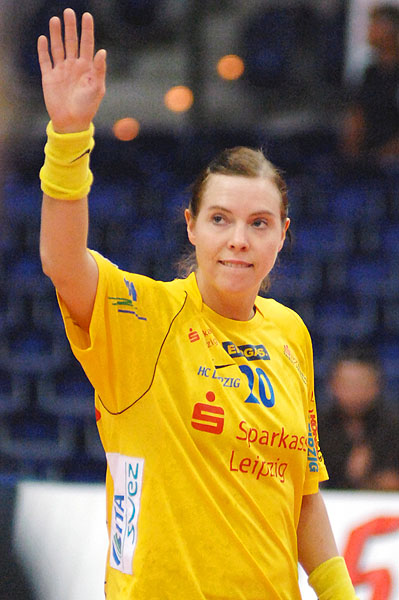

Personal information
- Nationality: Norwegian
- Born: 11 September 1978 (age 48) Gjøvik, Norway
- Height: 1.78 m (5 ft 10 in)

Sport
- Sport: Handball
- Position: Line player
- Current club: Nordstrand IF
- Number: 30

Senior clubs
- Years: Team
- –: Snertingdal IF
- –: Toten HK
- –2003: Nordstrand IF
- 2003–2008: HC Leipzig
- 2008–2010: Nordstrand IF
National team
Years	Team	Apps	(Gls)
1997–2008	Norway	215	(598)
Medal record
Women's handball
Representing Norway
Olympic Games
Gold medal – first place	2008 Beijing	Team
Bronze medal – third place	2000 Sydney	Team
World Championship
Gold medal – first place	1999 Denmark/Norway	Team
Silver medal – second place	2001 Italy	Team
Silver medal – second place	2007 France	Team
European Championship
Gold medal – first place	1998 Netherlands	Team
Gold medal – first place	2004 Hungary	Team
Gold medal – first place	2006 Sweden	Team
Silver medal – second place	2002 Denmark	Team
- Updated on 5 April 2010

Else-Marthe Sørlie Lybekk (née Sørlie; born 11 September 1978, in Gjøvik) is a Norwegian sports executive and former team handball player, world champion from 1999, gold medalist from the 2008 Summer Olympics in Beijing, and bronze medalist from the 2000 Olympics. She is also a triple European champion with the Norwegian national team, which she previously captained prior to the reign of fellow Gjøvik handballer Gro Hammerseng. She is the only player on the Norwegian team that received all the first five gold medals that the national team won up to the 2008 Olympics. Ending her career for Nordstrand in her second spell, she has previously played for Leipzig, Nordstrand, Snertingdal and Toten.

Since 2024 she has been acting secretary general for the Norwegian Olympic and Paralympic Committee and Confederation of Sports.

== International career ==
2 November 1997, Sørlie Lybekk debuted in a friendly against Germany, marking the beginning of a long career for the Norwegian side. She participated in consecutive international championships from her debut in the 1998 European Championships until the 2008 Olympics, except for the 2004 European Championships where she was dropped after having suffered injuries preventing her from a necessary build-up, and the World Championships the following year. At the 2004 European championship she was not included in the main team, but was listed as home reserve. When Isabel Blanco injured her thumb during the championship, Sørlie Lybekk was called to join the team, and received a gold medal from the championship without playing. Before the 2000 Olympics, she was named vice-captain for Kjersti Grini, and when Grini withdrew from the 2000 European Championships she captained her national team at the age of 22 at a difficult moment when many experienced players had recently retired. She remained in this position until the 2003 World Championship where Gro Hammerseng took over the captaincy. The tournament was disappointing for both the squad and Sørlie Lybekk, as they finished 6th in the tournament keeping them out of the Olympic tournament the following year.

The first highpoint in her international career is the victory in the 1999 World Championships held on home turf (alongside Denmark) where she was contributing to her nation's win mostly in the defensive side of the game. In the epic final against France her unforgiving defensive work cost her three two-minute suspensions meaning a red card, meaning she had to see her compatriots win the extra time playoffs from the bench. It was the first World Championship won by her country, a natural highpoint, but since the Olympic tournaments carry higher status in the sport, the win from the 2008 Olympics was an even higher point. In the tournament Sørlie Lybekk, now 29, contributed with her international experience and calm, in both ends of the pitch. Norway went undefeated through the tournament, and scoring 7 goals in the final against Russia as well as making a profound impression throughout the tournament, she was selected into the All Star Team of the tournament (as pivot/line player). The success sparked speculation that she would retire from international duty when she was on top of her long career.

== Playing style ==
As a line player, Sørlie Lybekk is known for secure finishing when she dispatches from the 6-meter line, often after relentless fighting for positions in the most crowded area of the defense. Being a player used in both defense and attack, she applies the same hard-working style in defending her own goal. The playing style is efficient, but not as spectacular as other notable players in her generation of Norwegian handballers.

== Post-playing career ==
She retired as player in 2010, and has later given birth to three children. She eventually assumed administrative positions at the Norwegian Olympic and Paralympic Committee and Confederation of Sports, where she was assisting secretary general under secretary general Nils Einar Aas. When Aas resigned his position in December 2024, Lybekk took over as acting secretary general until the next executive was appointed. In May 2025 the confederation announced Kjell Bjarne Helland to become the new secretary general, effective from latest 4 August.

== Awards and recognitions ==
Sørlie Lybekk was awarded the Håndballstatuetten trophy from the Norwegian Handball Federation in 2013.
