= GF World Cup '08 =

International women's handball competition

The GF World Cup '08 was held in Århus, Denmark, from October 14 to October 19. It is an invitational women's handball tournament organized by the Danish Handball Association.

== Competition ==
=== Group A ===
Team	Pld	W	D	L	GF	GA	GD	Pts
Denmark	3	3	0	0	99	81	+18	6
France	3	2	0	1	76	79	−3	4
Russia	3	1	0	2	81	82	−1	2
Hungary	3	0	0	3	80	94	−14	0

All times are Central European Summer Time (UTC+2)

October 14, 2008; 14:00	Hungary	23 – 29	France	NRGi Arena; Attendance: 503; Referees: Bol, van Eck (NED)
October 14, 2008; 14:00	Szucsánszki 8	(Report)	Baudouin 5	NRGi Arena; Attendance: 503; Referees: Bol, van Eck (NED)

October 14, 2008; 20:00	Denmark	32 – 27	Russia	NRGi Arena; Attendance: 2,799; Referees: Andersen, Sødal (NOR)
October 14, 2008; 20:00	Skov, Mikkelsen 6	(Report)	Dmitrieva 6	NRGi Arena; Attendance: 2,799; Referees: Andersen, Sødal (NOR)

October 15, 2008; 14:00	Russia	29 – 24	Hungary	NRGi Arena; Attendance: 475; Referees: Gjeding, Hansen (DEN)
October 15, 2008; 14:00	Zhilinskayte 5	(Report)	Szucsánszki 6	NRGi Arena; Attendance: 475; Referees: Gjeding, Hansen (DEN)

October 15, 2008; 20:00	Denmark	31 – 21	France	NRGi Arena; Attendance: 3,605; Referees: Dobrovits, Tájok (HUN)
October 15, 2008; 20:00	Augustesen 5	(Report)	Kanto, Ayglon, Pineau, Deroin 3	NRGi Arena; Attendance: 3,605; Referees: Dobrovits, Tájok (HUN)

October 16, 2008; 14:00	Russia	25 – 26	France	NRGi Arena; Attendance: 511; Referees: Olesen, Pedersen (DEN)
October 16, 2008; 14:00	Levina 4	(Report)	Ayglon 5	NRGi Arena; Attendance: 511; Referees: Olesen, Pedersen (DEN)

October 16, 2008; 20:00	Denmark	36 – 33	Hungary	NRGi Arena; Attendance: 3,200; Referees: Bol, van Eck (NED)
October 16, 2008; 20:00	Aaen, Touray 6	(Report)	Tomori 7	NRGi Arena; Attendance: 3,200; Referees: Bol, van Eck (NED)

=== Group B ===
Team	Pld	W	D	L	GF	GA	GD	Pts
Norway	3	3	0	0	90	52	+38	6
Germany	3	2	0	1	88	87	+1	4
Sweden	3	1	0	2	69	77	−8	2
Romania	3	0	0	3	72	93	−21	0

All times are Central European Summer Time (UTC+2)

October 14, 2008; 16:00	Sweden	27 – 28	Germany	NRGi Arena; Attendance: 600; Referees: Gjeding, Hansen (DEN)
October 14, 2008; 16:00	Ahlm 7	(Report)	Jurack 6	NRGi Arena; Attendance: 600; Referees: Gjeding, Hansen (DEN)

October 14, 2008; 18:00	Norway	30 – 23	Romania	NRGi Arena; Attendance: 2,000; Referees: Dobrovits, Tájok (HUN)
October 14, 2008; 18:00	Riegelhuth 7	(Report)	Ardean-Elisei 6	NRGi Arena; Attendance: 2,000; Referees: Dobrovits, Tájok (HUN)

October 15, 2008; 16:00	Sweden	29 – 24	Romania	NRGi Arena; Attendance: 921; Referees: Andersen, Sødal (NOR)
October 15, 2008; 16:00	Boson 6	(Report)	Ardean-Elisei 7	NRGi Arena; Attendance: 921; Referees: Andersen, Sødal (NOR)

October 15, 2008; 18:00	Norway	35 – 26	Germany	NRGi Arena; Attendance: 1,800; Referees: Bol, van Eck (NED)
October 15, 2008; 18:00	Nøstvold, Riegelhuth 7	(Report)	Krause 5	NRGi Arena; Attendance: 1,800; Referees: Bol, van Eck (NED)

October 16, 2008; 14:00	Germany	34 – 25	Romania	NRGi Arena; Referees: Andersen, Sødal (NOR)
October 16, 2008; 14:00	Jurack 8	(Report)	Ardean-Elisei 9	NRGi Arena; Referees: Andersen, Sødal (NOR)

October 16, 2008; 18:00	Norway	25 – 13	Sweden	NRGi Arena; Referees: Dobrovits, Tájok (HUN)
October 16, 2008; 18:00	Sulland 7	(Report)	Ahlm 5	NRGi Arena; Referees: Dobrovits, Tájok (HUN)

=== Knockout Rounds ===
Semifinal
October 18, 2008 - 14:20
Norway	24
France	21
October 18, 2008 - 16:10
Denmark	35
Germany	32

Final
October 19, 2008 - 16:10
Denmark	18
Norway	30
Bronze Match
October 19, 2008 - 14:20
France	29
Germany	23

==== Semifinals ====
October 18, 2008; 14:20	Norway	24 – 21	France	NRGi Arena; Attendance: 3,200; Referees: Olesen, Pedersen (DEN)
October 18, 2008; 14:20	Larsen 5	(Report)	Lacrabere 4	NRGi Arena; Attendance: 3,200; Referees: Olesen, Pedersen (DEN)

October 18, 2008; 16:10	Denmark	35 – 32	Germany	NRGi Arena; Attendance: 3,265; Referees: Bol, van Eck (NED)
October 18, 2008; 16:10	Dalby, Touray 6	(Report)	Jurack 9	NRGi Arena; Attendance: 3,265; Referees: Bol, van Eck (NED)

==== Bronze Match ====
October 19, 2008; 14:20	France	29 – 23	Germany	NRGi Arena; Attendance: 2,200; Referees: Olesen, Pedersen (DEN)
October 19, 2008; 14:20	Tounkara 5	(Report)	Jurack 6	NRGi Arena; Attendance: 2,200; Referees: Olesen, Pedersen (DEN)

==== Final ====
October 19, 2008; 16:10	Denmark	18 – 30	Norway	NRGi Arena; Attendance: 3,432; Referees: Bol, van Eck (NED)
October 19, 2008; 16:10	Dalby 4	(Report)	Riegelhuth 6	NRGi Arena; Attendance: 3,432; Referees: Bol, van Eck (NED)

=== All-Star Team ===
- Goalkeeper: Katrine Lunde Haraldsen (NOR)
- Left Wing: Henriette Rønde Mikkelsen (DEN)
- Left Back: Tonje Larsen (NOR)
- Center Back: Kristine Lunde (NOR)
- Right Back: Grit Jurack (GER)
- Right Wing: Josephine Touray (DEN)
- Line Player: Marit Malm Frafjord (NOR)
- MVP: Tonje Larsen (NOR)
