= Ivar Rønningen =

Norwegian footballer (born 1975)

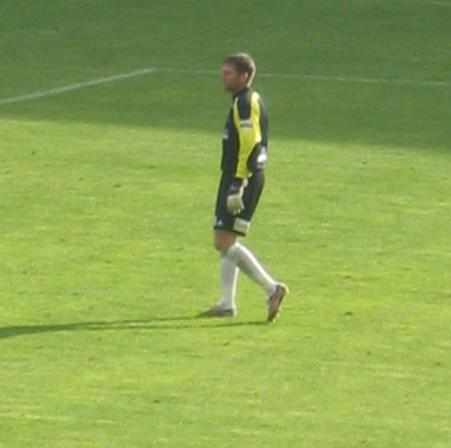

Personal information
- Full name: Ivar Rønningen
- Date of birth: 13 February 1975 (age 51)
- Place of birth: Lunner, Norway
- Height: 1.90 m (6 ft 3 in)
- Position: Goalkeeper

Youth career
- –1993: Lunner

Senior career*
Years	Team	Apps	(Gls)
1994–1999	Vålerenga	3	(1)
1999	→ Walsall (loan)	0	(0)
1999	→ Grindvoll (loan)	8	(0)
1999	→ Lillestrøm (loan)	2	(0)
2000–2004	Brann	79	(0)
2004–2005	Rosenborg	6	(0)
2006–2012	Ham-Kam	133	(1)

International career
1994	Norway G18	2	(0)
1998	Norway U-21	1	(0)
2002	Norway B	1	(0)
- * Club domestic league appearances and goals

Ivar Rønningen (born 13 February 1975) is a Norwegian former professional footballer who played as a goalkeeper for Vålerenga, Brann, Rosenborg and HamKam. He also spent time on loan with Walsall and Lillestrøm. After playing professional football for almost 20 years, Rønningen retired after the 2012-season, and joined HamKam as a goalkeeper coach.

== Career ==
=== Early years ===
Rønningen was born in Lunner and played for the local club Lunner IL until he joined Vålerenga in 1994. He made his debut for Vålerenga in the 1997 Norwegian Football Cup match against Brann, and became the first goalkeeper to score a goal in an official match, when he scored from the penalty spot in the 6–0 victory against Eik-Tønsberg.

Rønningen did not get many chances for Vålerenga, and in the spring of 1999 he was loaned out to English club Walsall. When Rønningen returned to Norway, the only club who wanted to get Rønningen on loan was the Norwegian Third Division side Grindvoll. Lillestrøm needed a goalkeeper-reserve in the fall of 1999, and Thodesen tipped the club that Rønningen was available for loan.

=== Brann ===
After Thodesen was hired as Teitur Thordarson's assistant in Brann ahead of the 2000 season, he brought Rønningen to the club. After a year as the second-choice goalkeeper, but got the chance when Magnus Kihlstedt was injured in the spring of 2001. Rønningen soon became the first choice at Brann, and in August 2001 he was called up to the Norway national football team, two years after he was playing in the Third Division. Rønningen was never capped for Norway, but did play one match for Norway B against Romania in January 2002, in addition to two matches for the under-21 team and one match for the under-18 team.

Rønningen scored a goal from the penalty spot in the 4–1 victory against Hovding in the second round of the 2002 Norwegian Football Cup. Brann was leading 3–1 and had been awarded a penalty kick, which Rønningen converted. Rønningen remained a regular at Brann, even though he was competing with the talented youngster Håkon Opdal, and played a total of 95 matches for the club, until he in the summer of 2004 transferred to rivals Rosenborg.

=== Rosenborg ===
That he transferred to Rosenborg was quite a surprise, as they already had the goalkeepers Espen Johnsen and Alexander Lund Hansen. Rønningen was however not happy with the contract negotiation with Brann, and moved to Rosenborg where he received a bigger payment, even though he was thought to be the third-choice goalkeeper. The young goalkeeper Lund Hansen was sent on loan to Fredrikstad FK so that he could play regularly, and Rønningen remained the second-choice goalkeeper at Rosenborg, but did however play the first round of the 2005 Norwegian Football Cup against Orkla, where he scored one of the goals from the penalty spot in the 11–0 victory.

=== HamKam ===
Rønningen moved to HamKam ahead of the 2006 season, and was the first-choice goalkeeper until Jon Masalin became the preferred goalkeeper half-way through the 2008 season. Rønningen wanted to leave HamKam, but after Masalin was injured Rønningen again became the first choice. Rønningen stayed at the club through two relegations, even though his payment was reduced from 1,2 M NOK at Rosenborg to 0,2 M NOK at the third tier. He scored a goal on a penalty when HamKam won promotion back to the second tier with a 6–0 victory against Lørenskog in the decisive match of the 2010 season.

According to the local newspaper Hamar Arbeiderblad, Rønningen was HamKam's best player in the 2011 season, and the 36-year-old decided to play for one more season, despite being called "father" by his younger teammates. He was however injured in the beginning of the next season, and he believed he had played his last match for HamKam, but when his replacement Gary Hogan was injured, Rønningen was again playing. After playing for the club for seven seasons, Rønningen retired after the 2012 season and joined HamKam's coaching staff as a goalkeeper coach, where he was working the talented goalkeepers Lars Øvernes and Emil Holst.
