= Tveter =

Tveter is a Norwegian surname that may refer to

- Alexander Ruud Tveter (born 1991), Norwegian football forward
- Annette Tveter (born 1974), Norwegian handball player
- Bjørn Tveter (born 1944), Norwegian speed skater
- Finn Tveter (1947–2018), Norwegian jurist and Olympic rower
- Inger-Johanne Tveter, Norwegian handball player
- Kåre Tveter (1922–2012), Norwegian painter and illustrator
- Øyvind Tveter (born 1954), Norwegian speed skater, brother of Bjørn

== See also ==
- Tveten
