= Heidi Aassveen Halvorsen =

Norwegian handball player (born 1976)

Medal record

Women's handball

World Championship
Silver medal – second place	2001 Italy	Team

Heidi Aassveen Halvorsen (born January 7, 1976) is a Norwegian handball goalkeeper. She played eight matches for the national handball team in 2001, and participated at the 2001 World Women's Handball Championship in Italy, where the Norwegian team placed second.

She hails from Tomter. Her clubs were Tomter, Eidsberg, Lunner, Stabæk, Aarhus and Bækkelaget.
