= Tone Anne Alvestad Seland =

Norwegian handball player

Personal information
- Nationality: Norwegian
- Born: 26 February 1967 (age 59)

Sport
- Sport: Handball
- Position: Back

Senior clubs
- Years: Team
- –: Gjerpen IF
National team
Years	Team	Apps	(Gls)
1989–1990	Norway	12	(10)

Tone Anne Alvestad Seland (born 26 February 1967) is a Norwegian handball player. She played twelve matches for the national handball team from 1989 to 1990, and participated at the 1990 World Women's Handball Championship, where the Norwegian team placed sixth.
