= Sigrid Halvorsen =

Norwegian handball player (born 1941)

Personal information
- Nationality: Norwegian
- Born: May 31, 1945 Brandval, Norway
- Died: April 10, 2023 (aged 77) Våler

Sport
- Sport: Handball

Senior clubs
- Years: Team
- –: Brandval Idrettslag
National team
Years	Team	Apps	(Gls)
1964–1973	Norway	84	(106)

Sigrid Halvorsen (20 May 1941 - 10 April 2023) is a Norwegian handball player. She played 84 matches for the Norway women's national handball team between 1964 and 1973. She participated at the 1971 and 1973 World Women's Handball Championship.

In 1967 and 1970 she won the Norwegian Women's Handball League with Brandval Idrettslag, in 1968 she won a bronze medal and in 1970 she won a silver medal. She also won the Outdoor Norwegian championship in 1969 and 1972.

Halvorsen was awarded the Håndballstatuetten trophy from the Norwegian Handball Federation in 2000.

Her three sisters, Bjørg, Fanny and Randi were also handball players and they played together on the Brandval team. Her brother, Leif Halvorsen, was a coach on the team.
