= Vigdis Hårsaker =

Norwegian handball player (born 1981)

Personal information
- Full name: Vigdis Hårsaker
- Born: July 16, 1981 (age 45) Sandefjord, Norway

Sport
- Sport: Handball
- Position: Right back

Youth career
- Years: Team
- 1995-2000: Sjetne

Senior clubs
- Years: Team
- 2000-2001: Byåsen
- 2001-2003: Toulon VAR HB ASCM
- 2003-2005: Byåsen
- 2001-2003: Larvik
- 2005-2010: Byåsen
National team
Years	Team	Apps	(Gls)
2000-2010	Norway	133	(337)

Teams managed
- 2009-2010: Byåsen (player-assistant)
- –: Sjetne (Youth coach)
Medal record
Representing Norway
Women's handball
World Championship
Silver medal – second place	2001 Italy	Team competition
Silver medal – second place	2007 France	Team competition
European Championship
Silver medal – second place	2002 Denmark	Team competition
Gold medal – first place	2004 Hungary	Team competition

Vigdis Hårsaker (born July 16, 1981) is a Norwegian former handball player, who played most of her club handball for Byåsen IL.

== Career ==
She first played handball for Sjetne. At age 14, she transferred to Byåsen. In the 2002/03 season she was topscorer in the Norwegian league.

She went a year to France to study the language, where she played for Toulon VAR HB ASCM (on loan by Byåsen). Later she played two years in for Larvik HK, where she won the Norwegian Championship and the EHF Cup Winners' Cup. But eventually she would eventually return to Byåsen again. In 2009 she became the player-assistant manager at the club. She retired in 2010.

Hårsaker debuted on the Norwegian national team in 2000, at age 19. She has played a total of 133 matches, scoring 337 times. She was part of the team that won silver in the 2002 European Championship and a gold in the subsequent 2004 Championship. She has also twice won the silver medal at the World Championship, in 2001, Italy and 2007, France.

After her playing career she became a youth coach at Sjetne, where she herself played as a kid.

== Achievements ==
- 2007: World Championship - Silver
- 2006: Norwegian League (Byåsen IL) - Silver
- 2005: Norwegian League (Larvik HK) - Gold

EHF Cup Winners Cup (Larvik HK) - Gold

- 2004: Norwegian League (Larvik HK) - Bronze

European Championship - Gold
Norwegian League Right Back Player of the Year

- 2002: European Championship - Silver
- 2001: World Championship - Silver
