= Elisabeth Hilmo =

Norwegian handball player (born 1976)

Personal information
- Nationality: Norwegian
- Born: 29 November 1976 (age 49) Trondheim, Norway
- Height: 180 cm (5 ft 11 in)

Sport
- Sport: Handball
- Position: Line player

Youth career
- Years: Team
- –: Selbu IL

Senior clubs
- Years: Team
- -2001: Selbu IL
- 2001-2002: Byåsen IL
- 2002-2004: Selbu IL
- 2002-2007: Larvik HK
National team
| Years | Team | Apps | (Gls) |
| 1998–2006 | Norway | 180 | (282) |
Medal record
Olympic Games
| Bronze medal – third place | 2000 Sydney | Team |
World Championship
| Gold medal – first place | 1999 Denmark/Norway | Team |
| Silver medal – second place | 2001 Italy | Team |
European Championship
| Gold medal – first place | 1998 Netherlands | Team |
| Gold medal – first place | 2004 Hungary | Team |
| Silver medal – second place | 2002 Denmark | Team |

Elisabeth Hilmo (born 29 November 1976) is a Norwegian team handball player and World Champion. She was primarily known as a defensively strong player. She received a bronze medal at the 2000 Summer Olympics in Sydney.

== Career ==
=== Club career ===
Hilmo started playing handball aged 7 at her hometown club Selbu IL. With them she eventually played in the top division in Norway. After the team was relegated, she joined Byåsen IL. A year later she returned to Selbu, after they had returned to the top division.

In 2004 she joined Larvik HK, where she won the Norwegian championship three times in a row from 2005 to 2007.

Due to pregnancy she retired in December 2007.

=== National team ===
She made her debut for the Norwegian national team on 25 September 1998 against Russia. Her first major international tournament was the 1998 European Championship, where Norway won gold medals. This was the first time Norway won the tournament.

A year later she won gold medals at the 1999 World Championship.

=== Awards and recognitions ===
Hilmo was awarded the Håndballstatuetten trophy from the Norwegian Handball Federation in 2010.

== Private ==
Her grandmother, Marit, and both of her siblings, Marita and Arnfinn are also handball players. She is educated as a Data engineer.
