= Kristin Cecilie Karlsen =

Norwegian handball player

Personal information
- Nationality: Norwegian

Sport
- Sport: Handball
National team
Years	Team	Apps	(Gls)
1990–1990	Norway	33	(24)

Kristin Cecilie Karlsen is a Norwegian handball player. She played 33 matches for the national handball team in 1990. She participated at the 1990 World Women's Handball Championship, where the Norwegian team placed sixth.
