= Janne Tuven =

Norwegian handball player (born 1975)

Personal information
- Nationality: Norwegian
- Born: 25 October 1975 (age 50) Son, Norway

Sport
- Sport: Handball
- Position: Right back/wing

Senior clubs
- Years: Team
- –: Vestby HK
- –1995: Nordstrand IF
- 1995–2002: Stabæk IF
- 2002–2003: Ikast-Bording EH
National team
Years	Team	Apps	(Gls)
1994–2003	Norway	108	(268)
Medal record
Representing Norway
Women's handball
World Championship
Silver medal – second place	1997 Germany	Team
Silver medal – second place	2001 Italy	Team
European Championship
Silver medal – second place	1996 Denmark	Team
Gold medal – first place	1998 Netherlands	Team
Silver medal – second place	2002 Denmark	Team

Janne Tuven (born 25 October 1975) is a Norwegian team handball player.

She played for the clubs Vestby HK, Nordstrand IF and Stabæk IF. She also spent time on loan at Ikast. For the Norway women's national handball team. She received silver medals at the World Women's Handball Championship in 1997 and in 2001, and became European champion in 1998.

Tuven made her debut on the national team in 1994. She played 108 matches and scored 268 goals for the national team. She struggled with injury problems through much of her career.

She has a relationship with retired footballer Christian Holter. They live in Sandvika.
