= Norway women's national handball team =

Women's national handball team representing Norway

Norway

Information
- Nickname: Håndballjentene (The handball girls)
- Association: Norwegian Handball Federation
- Coach: Ole Gjekstad
- Assistant coach: Tonje Larsen
- Captain: Henny Reistad
- Most caps: Katrine Lunde (389)
- Most goals: Kjersti Grini (1003)

Colours
1st	2nd	3rd

Results

Summer Olympics
- Appearances: 9 (First in 1988)
- Best result: (gold) 1st (2008, 2012, 2024)

World Championship
- Appearances: 23 (First in 1971)
- Best result: (gold) 1st (1999, 2011, 2015, 2021, 2025)

European Championship
- Appearances: 16 (First in 1994)
- Best result: 1st (1998, 2004, 2006, 2008, 2010, 2014, 2016, 2020, 2022, 2024)
- Last updated on Unknown.

Norway women's national handball team
Medal record

Olympic Games
Gold medal – first place	2008 Beijing	Team
Gold medal – first place	2012 London	Team
Gold medal – first place	2024 Paris	Team
Silver medal – second place	1988 Seoul	Team
Silver medal – second place	1992 Barcelona	Team
Bronze medal – third place	2000 Sydney	Team
Bronze medal – third place	2016 Rio de Janeiro	Team
Bronze medal – third place	2020 Tokyo	Team

World Championship
Gold medal – first place	1999 Denmark/Norway	
Gold medal – first place	2011 Brazil	
Gold medal – first place	2015 Denmark	
Gold medal – first place	2021 Spain	
Gold medal – first place	2025 Germany/Netherlands	
Silver medal – second place	1997 Germany	
Silver medal – second place	2001 Italy	
Silver medal – second place	2007 France	
Silver medal – second place	2017 Germany	
Silver medal – second place	2023 Denmark/Norway/Sweden	
Bronze medal – third place	1986 Netherlands	
Bronze medal – third place	1993 Norway	
Bronze medal – third place	2009 China	

European Championship
Gold medal – first place	1998 Netherlands	
Gold medal – first place	2004 Hungary	
Gold medal – first place	2006 Sweden	
Gold medal – first place	2008 Macedonia	
Gold medal – first place	2010 Norway/Denmark	
Gold medal – first place	2014 Croatia/Hungary	
Gold medal – first place	2016 Sweden	
Gold medal – first place	2020 Denmark	
Gold medal – first place	2022 Slovenia/North Macedonia/Montenegro	
Gold medal – first place	2024 Austria/Hungary/Switzerland	
Silver medal – second place	1996 Denmark	
Silver medal – second place	2002 Denmark	
Silver medal – second place	2012 Serbia	
Bronze medal – third place	1994 Germany	

The Norway women's national handball team represents Norway at international handball competitions, and is governed by the Norges Håndballforbund (NHF). As of December 2025, Norway has been in 28 finals and is regarded as one of the finest women's national handball teams ever, with 35 medals.

Norway women's national handball team holds the distinction in the sport for being the only handball team, on the women's side, and men's side, to have won the European Championship four consecutive times. Their 10 gold medals is a sports record. In 2011, they became the sport's third team and the second Women's team, following Denmark to have held all three titles simultaneously: The World Championship, the Olympic Championship and the Euro Championship. In 2015, they won the World Championship and have the distinction of the first Women's handball team to hold simultaneously international titles twice: the 2015 World Championship, the 2014 European Championship and the 2012 Olympic Championship. In 2025 they did it for the third time, simultaneously holding all three international titles.

As of December 2025, they are the reigning triple European champions, the reigning World Champions and the reigning Olympic champions.

== History ==
Norway has been among the world elite in women's handball since the break-through at the 1986 World Championship where the team won a bronze medal. Since then, Norway has won eight European Championships, and four World Championships. Norway has been in four final matches at the Summer Olympics, and gold medaled in Beijing 2008 and London 2012. Norway is unsurpassed in the European Championships, having won eight golds, three silvers, and one bronze in fourteen tournaments. The 2000 European Championship where they ended 6th and in the 2018 European Championship where they ended 5th, is the only times Norway finished outside of the top three.

=== Early years (1946–1983) ===
The very first match of the Norwegian women's national handball team, against Sweden in 1946, was met with great public interest. The game ended 2–5 in favour of Sweden. During the fifties and sixties women's handball had a relatively low profile in Norway. The national team regularly participated at the Scandinavian Championships, and they qualified for the World Championships in 1971, 1973, 1975 and 1982, placing 7th twice and 8th twice.

=== Jacobsen period (1984–1993) ===
Sven-Tore Jacobsen coached the national team for ten years, from 1984 to 1993. The team qualified for the 1986 World Championships, where they sensationally won the bronze medal, and they achieved Olympic silver medals in both 1988 and 1992. The press coverage and popularity of female handball in Norway increased significantly during this period.

=== Breivik period (1994–2009) ===
Former player Marit Breivik coached the team from 1994 to 2009. During her tenure, the team won six gold medals in international championships. Their achievements included gold medals at the 1999 World Championships, four gold medals at the European Championships from 1998 to 2008, and gold medals at the 2008 Summer Olympics. Their play strategy included a strong 6–0 defense and frequent fast breaks on offense.

==== 2008 ====
After the defeat against Russia at the 2007 World Championship, Norway faced two important challenges in 2008: Olympic Games in August and European Championship in December. The team won their first Olympic gold medal, and they won the European Championship.

===== Olympic Games 2008, Beijing =====
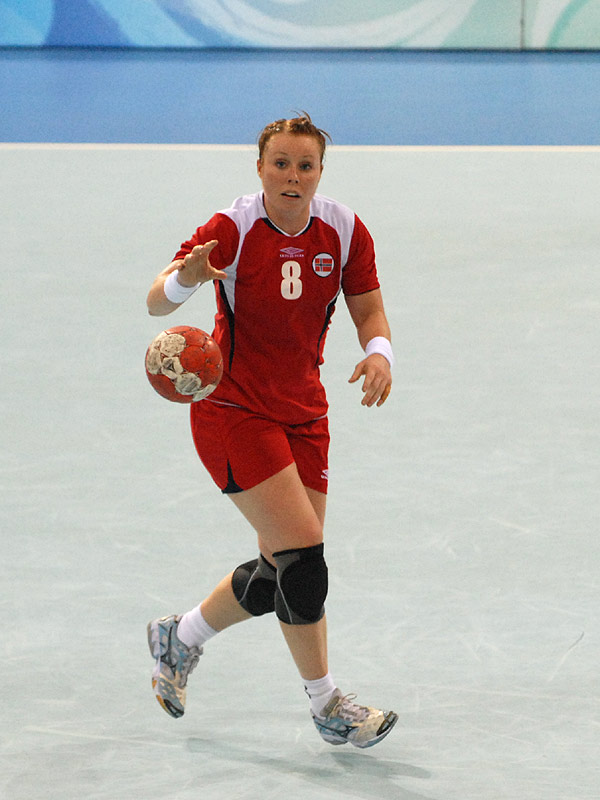
Karoline Dyhre Breivang during the match against Romania on 17 August

Norway had qualified for the 2008 Summer Olympics by winning the 2006 European Championship. The preparation for Beijing started months before the competition started, but the final squad wasn't decided until the last weeks. Several players who had trained with the team up to this point were left out or kept as reserves, most notably Isabel Blanco and Terese Pedersen. There were no debuts in the group selected by Marit Breivik, but veteran Tonje Larsen made her comeback to the team after five years of struggle with injury. Gro Hammerseng maintained her usual role of team captain, with Else-Marthe Sørlie Lybekk and Gøril Snorroeggen completing the "captains team" as vice-captains.

The competition for the Norwegian team started on 9 August against the host, China. They defeated the Chinese 30–26 and then went on to win comfortably against Angola (31–17), Kazakhstan (35–19) and France (34–24). The closest result of the preliminary round was the last match, on 17 August, against Romania (24–23). During the warm up of this match Katja Nyberg suffered a knee injury that prevented her from playing the quarter final against Sweden. Norway defeated the Swedish team 31–24, advancing to the semi-finals comfortably.

The semi-final match was played on 21 August. Former Olympic and World Champions South Korea turned out to be the toughest opponent of the tournament. After 58 minutes of play Norway was leading 28–25. In less than two minutes the Koreans managed to score three goals in a row, reaching the tie score of 28–28 with only two seconds left. Katrine Lunde Haraldsen quickly started the last attack of the game with a pass to Karoline Dyhre Breivang, who was already at the middle of the field. Breivang passed the ball on to Hammerseng who scored at the 60 minutes mark. The goal was validated by the referees but the Norwegians refrained from celebrating until the IHF delegate finally confirmed the decision.

The final match was played on 23 August. It was a replay of the 2007 World Championship, Norway vs Russia. The Norwegian victory was secured early on. They were already leading by 10 goals after 14 minutes played and Trefilov's team never managed to lower that margin below a five-goal difference. The match ended 34–27 for Norway. Linn-Kristin Riegelhuth was top scorer with nine goals out of ten shots.

The Norwegian team received their first Olympic gold medal after the final match. Two Norwegian players were selected into the tournament's All-Star Team: Katrine Lunde Haraldsen as goalkeeper and Else-Marthe Sørlie Lybekk as pivot. Lunde Haraldsen was also overall top goalkeeper with a 42% save rate while Kari Aalvik Grimsbø ranked first (together with Korean Oh Yongran) at 7-metres shots with a 40% rate. Regarding team statistics, Lybekk finished the tournament as Norway's top scorer with 31 goals and a 72% scoring rate, two points ahead of Riegelhuth who scored the same number of goals but with a 70% success rate.

===== European Championship 2008, Macedonia =====
After the Olympic Games, Breivik encountered challenges for the 2008 European Championship: Lybekk retired from the national team, Snorroeggen was recovering from a shoulder injury and both Hammerseng and Nyberg would forego international play in order to recover from recent sport activity with only club matches.

Thus a new squad was formed. Three players made their debut: Heidi Løke (pivot) and Tine Rustad Kristiansen (centre back) from Larvik, and Camilla Herrem (left wing) from Byåsen. With the three members of the Olympic "captains team" out, Kristine Lunde was appointed new captain with Marit Malm Frafjord and Karoline Dyhre Breivang as vice-captains.

Norway was a favorite to win the European title, especially after winning the GF World Cup '08 and Møbelringen Cup 2008. Spain was not overcome with the perceived invincibility of the competition when Norway lost to them the first match of the tournament on 3 December. The Norwegians could only tie 21–21 against Spain, the same team which left them out of the 2004 Summer Olympics in 2003. Following that first disappointment, they managed to advance through the preliminary round and main round without a loss.

The semi-final match was played on 13 December against Russia. It was an easy win for Norway and even goalkeeper Haraldsen was able to score once. On 14 December, Spain was waiting at the final match. After an even first half the score was 13–12 for the defending champions. During the second half Norway increased the lead to a final score of 34–21.

Euro 2008 was the third European Championship gold in a row for Norway, and the fourth title in the history of the team. Linn-Kristin Riegelhuth was top scorer of the tournament with 51 goals and four Norwegian players were included in the All-Star Team: Riegelhuth as right wing, Katrine Lunde Haraldsen as goalkeeper, Tonje Larsen as left back and Kristine Lunde as center back. Lunde was also named MVP.

=== Hergeirsson period (2009–2024) ===
In 2009 Thorir Hergeirsson took over as coach, and the first season resulted in a bronze medal at the 2009 World Championships. A year later, in 2010, the team won its 5th European Championship title and in 2011 its second World Championship. In August 2012, the team defended its Beijing Olympic gold by beating Montenegro 26–23 in the final at the Olympic Games in London. In the European Championship the same year, the two teams met again. This time Montenegro beat Norway, who won silver. The Norwegian team won another gold medal at the 2014 European Women's Handball Championship, and at the 2015 World Women's Handball Championship in Denmark they won their third World Championship title. They won a bronze medal at the 2016 Olympics, having lost to Russia in the semi-final after extra time. At the 2016 European Women's Handball Championship in Sweden, the Norwegian team won their seventh title. The team won a silver medal at the 2017 World Women's Handball Championship in Germany, defeated by France in the final. At the 2018 European Women's Handball Championship in France they failed to reach the semi-finals, but finished 5th after defeating Sweden in the top 5 match.

In 2018 Henny Reistad made her debut for the Norwegian national team, and she would later be named the IHF World Player of the Year in 2023 and 2024 and was named captain of the team after Stine Oftedal Dahmkes retirement after the 2024 Summer Olympics. Norway then entered a period where they won three straight European championships in 2020, 2022 and 2024, gold medals at the 2021 World Women's Handball Championship and they won an Olympic gold medal at the 2024 Summer Olympics. At the 2023 World Women's Handball Championship they did however lose the final to France.

After the 2024 European Women's Handball Championship Thorir Hergeirsson finished his last contract as the head coach of Norway, marking the end of a 15 year old era. That championship also marked the end of the national team carrier of legend Camilla Herrem.

Hergeirsson was followed by Ole Gjekstad.

=== Gjekstad period (2025–) ===
The 2025 World Women's Handball Championship marked Gjekstad's first championship as the head coach of Norway. Norway won gold medals, winning every single match except the final against Germany with nine or more goals. His team was in many ways a continuation of Hergeirsson with most players being former world champions, including Reistad, Lunde, Mørk and, Skogrand among others.

== Honours ==
Competition	1st place, gold medalist(s)	2nd place, silver medalist(s)	3rd place, bronze medalist(s)	Total
Olympic Games	3	2	3	8
World Championship	5	5	3	13
European Championship	10	3	1	14
Total	18	10	7	35

== Competitive record ==
Champions Runners-up Third place Fourth place

=== Olympic Games ===
Since their first appearance in 1988, Norway has participated in eight Olympic Games. They received their first gold medal twenty years after the debut, in Beijing 2008.

Year	Position	Pld	W	D	L	GS	GA	GD
(Canada) 1976	Did not qualify							
(Soviet Union) 1980	Did not qualify							
(United States) 1984	Did not qualify							
(South Korea) 1988	2nd (silver)	4	3	1	1	115	91	+24
(Spain) 1992	2nd (silver)	5	3	0	2	99	110	−11
(United States) 1996	4th	5	2	0	3	116	109	+7
(Australia) 2000	3rd (bronze)	7	6	0	1	174	137	+37
(Greece) 2004	Did not qualify							
(China) 2008	1st (gold)	8	8	0	0	248	185	+63
(United Kingdom) 2012	1st (gold)	8	5	1	2	196	187	+9
(Brazil) 2016	3rd (bronze)	8	6	0	2	247	205	+42
(Japan) 2020	3rd (bronze)	8	7	0	1	258	191	+67
(France) 2024	1st (gold)	8	7	0	1	226	167	+59
(United States) 2028	TBD							
(Australia) 2032	TBD							
Total	9/15	53	40	2	22	1421	1191	+240

=== World Championship ===
Norway received their first World Championship medal in 1986, when they defeated three-time champions East Germany 23–19 in the third place play-off, marking also their first ever win over East Germany. They achieved a bronze medal in 1993, and a silver medal in 1997. In 1999 Norway won their first gold medal after a final match against France that needed two overtimes to break the tie. They won their second title in 2011, and their third title in 2015.

Year	Position	Pld	W	D	L	GS	GA	GD
(Socialist Federal Republic of Yugoslavia) 1957	Did not qualify							
(Romania) 1962	Did not qualify							
(West Germany) 1965	Did not qualify							
(Netherlands) 1971	7th	4	1	1	2	33	41	−8
(Socialist Federal Republic of Yugoslavia) 1973	8th	5	1	0	4	42	57	−15
(Soviet Union) 1975	8th	5	2	0	3	61	66	−5
(Czechoslovakia) 1978	Did not qualify							
(Hungary) 1982	7th	7	4	1	2	139	117	+22
(Netherlands) 1986	3rd	7	5	1	1	174	127	+47
(South Korea) 1990	6th	7	4	0	3	135	135	0
(Norway) 1993	3rd	7	6	0	1	144	126	+18
(Austria) (Hungary) 1995	4th	8	5	0	3	205	151	+54
(Germany) 1997	2nd	9	7	0	2	251	188	+63
(Denmark) (Norway) 1999	1st	9	8	0	1	240	170	+70
(Italy) 2001	2nd	9	8	0	1	292	203	+89
(Croatia) 2003	6th	9	6	1	2	297	241	+56
(Russia) 2005	9th	8	3	1	4	232	205	+27
(France) 2007	2nd	10	8	0	2	314	246	+68
(China) 2009	3rd	10	8	0	2	303	227	+76
(Brazil) 2011	1st	9	8	0	1	278	201	+77
(Serbia) 2013	5th	7	6	0	1	198	139	+59
(Denmark) 2015	1st	9	8	0	1	269	209	+60
(Germany) 2017	2nd	9	7	0	2	281	196	+85
(Japan) 2019	4th	10	7	0	3	309	249	+60
(Spain) 2021	1st	9	8	1	0	320	191	+129
(Denmark) (Norway) (Sweden) 2023	2nd	9	7	0	2	305	205	+100
(Germany) (Netherlands) 2025	1st	9	9	0	0	305	176	+129
(Hungary) 2027	Qualified							
(Spain) 2029	TBD							
(Czech Republic) (Poland) 2031	TBD							
Total	23/30	185	136	6	43	5127	3821	+1306

=== European Championship ===
As of 2024, Norway has participated in every European Championship that has taken place. They are the most successful team in the Championships, having won ten gold medals, three silver medals, and one bronze medal out of sixteen tournaments. The two times Norway finished outside of the top three were at the 2000 Championship in Romania and the 2018 Championship in France.

Year	Position	Pld	W	D	L	GS	GA	GD
(Germany) 1994	3rd	7	4	0	3	134	130	+4
(Denmark) 1996	2nd	7	4	2	1	179	151	+28
(Netherlands) 1998	1st	7	7	0	0	189	132	+57
(Romania) 2000	6th	6	2	2	2	151	149	+2
(Denmark) 2002	2nd	8	6	1	1	203	169	+34
(Hungary) 2004	1st	8	8	0	0	259	191	+68
(Sweden) 2006	1st	8	8	0	0	258	179	+79
(North Macedonia) 2008	1st	8	7	1	0	248	169	+79
(Denmark) (Norway) 2010	1st	8	7	0	1	239	146	+93
(Serbia) 2012	2nd	8	6	0	2	219	194	+25
(Hungary) (Croatia) 2014	1st	8	7	0	1	225	192	+33
(Sweden) 2016	1st	8	8	0	0	211	170	+41
(France) 2018	5th	7	5	0	2	224	177	+47
(Denmark) 2020	1st	8	8	0	0	254	180	+74
(Slovenia) (North Macedonia) (Montenegro) 2022	1st	8	7	0	1	239	190	+49
(Austria) (Hungary) (Switzerland) 2024	1st	9	9	0	0	300	206	+94
(Czech Republic) (Poland) (Romania) (Slovakia) (Turkey) 2026	Qualified							
(Denmark) (Sweden) (Norway) 2028	Qualified							
2030	TBD							
(Denmark) (Germany) (Poland) 2032	TBD							
Total	18/20	123	103	6	14	3532	2725	+807

=== Other tournaments ===
- Carpathian Trophy 1977 – Sixth place
- GF World Cup '05 – Winner
- GF World Cup '07 – Third place
- GF World Cup '08 – Winner
- GF World Cup '09 – Second place
- GF World Cup '10 – Second place
- Møbelringen Cup 2001 – Second place
- Møbelringen Cup 2002 – Second place
- Møbelringen Cup 2003 – Winner
- Møbelringen Cup 2004 – Winner
- Møbelringen Cup 2005 – Third place
- Møbelringen Cup 2006 – Winner
- Møbelringen Cup 2007 – Winner
- Møbelringen Cup 2008 – Winner
- Møbelringen Cup 2009 – Winner
- Møbelringen Cup 2010 – Winner
- Møbelringen Cup 2011 – Winner
- Møbelringen Cup 2012 – Third place
- Møbelringen Cup 2013 – Winner
- Møbelringen Cup 2014 – Second place
- Møbelringen Cup 2015 – Second place
- Møbelringen Cup 2016 – Winner
- Møbelringen Cup 2017 – Winner
- Møbelringen Cup 2018 – Winner
- Intersport Cup 2019 – Winner
- Intersport Cup 2021 – Winner
- EHF Euro Cup 2022 – Winner
- Golden League 2023 – Winner
- Posten Cup 2023 – Winner
- Posten Cup 2024 – Winner
- Golden League 2024 – Winner

== Team ==
=== Current squad ===
The squad chosen for the 2026 European Women's Handball Championship.

Head coach: Ole Gjekstad

Caps and goals as of 30 October 2026.

No.	Pos.	Name	Date of birth (age)	Height	App.	Goals	Club
3	CB	Frida Brandbu Andersen	27 September 2002 (age 24)	1.73 m	5	9	(Norway) Sola HK
8	CB	Live Rushfeldt Deila	15 January 2000 (age 26)	1.76 m	46	56	(Denmark) Team Esbjerg
9	RB	Nora Mørk	5 April 1991 (age 35)	1.69 m	207	958	(Denmark) Team Esbjerg
12	GK	Silje Solberg-Østhassel	16 June 1990 (age 36)	1.78 m	232	9	(Denmark) Team Esbjerg
13	P	Kari Brattset Dale	15 February 1991 (age 35)	1.83 m	150	401	(Hungary) Győri ETO KC
14	LB	Kristine Breistøl	23 August 1993 (age 33)	1.92 m	128	229	(Hungary) Győri ETO KC
17	RW	Tuva Høve	11 June 2000 (age 26)	1.75 m	9	15	(Romania) SCM Râmnicu Vâlcea
18	LW	Stella Waagan Kruse	7 May 2005 (age 21)	1.70 m	5	7	(Norway) Tertnes HE
19	P	Selma Henriksen	25 July 2002 (age 24)	1.79 m	22	41	(Norway) Sola HK
21	LB	Ingvild Bakkerud	9 July 1995 (age 31)	1.83 m	91	159	(Denmark) Odense Håndbold
25	CB	Henny Reistad (c)	9 February 1999 (age 27)	1.81 m	126	598	(Denmark) Team Esbjerg
26	RW	Emilie Hovden	5 April 1996 (age 30)	1.63 m	79	209	(Hungary) Győri ETO KC
27	LB	Henriette Espetvedt Eggen	16 December 2002 (age 23)	1.84 m	0	0	(Denmark) Team Esbjerg
29	LW	Kristin Venn	5 March 1994 (age 32)	1.68 m	11	26	(Norway) Storhamar HE
31	CB	Mia Svele	16 April 2001 (age 25)	1.74 m	1	1	(Denmark) Nykøbing Falster
33	LB	Thale Rushfeldt Deila	15 January 2000 (age 26)	1.78 m	85	205	(Hungary) Győri ETO KC
40	GK	Eli Marie Raasok	21 November 1996 (age 29)	1.76 m	36	1	(Norway) Storhamar HE
44	GK	June Krogh	2 December 2003 (age 22)	1.87 m	19	0	(Romania) SCM Râmnicu Vâlcea
46	P	Ane Høgseth	15 January 2001 (age 25)	1.78 m	34	16	(Norway) Storhamar HE

=== Extended squad ===
No.	Pos.	Name	Date of birth (age)	Height	App.	Goals	Club
1	GK	Mia Stensland	21 July 1999 (age 27)	1.78 m	0	0	(Norway) Storhamar HE
2	LB	Julie Hulleberg	15 June 2001 (age 25)	1.70 m	6	3	(Romania) Rapid București
20	RW	Marit Røsberg-Torgersen	25 February 1994 (age 32)	1.65 m	129	219	(Denmark) Team Esbjerg
22	RB	Kristina Novak	29 August 2000 (age 26)	1.76 m	35	47	(Romania) CSM București
23	LW	Camilla Herrem ^{RET}	8 October 1986 (age 40)	1.67 m	332	951	(Norway) Sola HK
24	LW	Sanna Solberg-Isaksen	16 June 1990 (age 36)	1.78 m	231	452	(Denmark) Team Esbjerg
28	GK	Rikke Granlund	14 November 1989 (age 36)	1.72 m	17	0	(Norway) Sola HK
30	LB	Maja Furu Sæteren	14 May 2003 (age 23)	1.72 m	16	31	(Norway) Larvik HK
32	GK	Olivia Lykke Nygaard	14 September 2001 (age 25)	1.80 m	8	2	(Denmark) Ikast Håndbold
35	DF	Martha Barka	13 June 1999 (age 27)	1.77 m	2	0	(Norway) Sola HK
36	RW	Tina Abdulla	20 September 1997 (age 29)	1.64 m	4	7	(Denmark) Odense Håndbold
37	LB	Guro Nestaker	15 August 1998 (age 28)	1.81 m	9	15	(Germany) Borussia Dortmund Handball
38	CB	Helene Fauske	31 January 1997 (age 29)	1.78 m	35	25	(Denmark) Odense Håndbold
39	P	Tirill Mørch	18 August 2000 (age 26)	1.77 m	0	0	(Norway) Larvik HK

=== Recent call-ups / recruit team ===
No.	Pos.	Name	Date of birth (age)	Height	App.	Goals	Club
	GK	Leah Isabell Langaard	13 November 2007 (age 18)	1.84 m	0	0	(Norway) Randesund IL
	LW	Milla Haugerstuen Breen	16 July 2006 (age 20)	1.76 m	0	0	(Norway) Aker Topphåndball
	LW	Selin Kamburce	12 January 2004 (age 22)	1.66 m	0	0	(Norway) Molde Elite
	RW	Isabell Nordstrand	21 January 2005 (age 21)	1.70 m	0	0	(Norway) Storhamar HE
	RW	Pia Grønstad	6 November 2005 (age 21)	1.80 m	0	0	(Norway) Sola HK
	RB	Johanne Nypan	25 June 2003 (age 23)	1.71 m	0	0	(Norway) Molde Elite
	RB	Sanne Løkka Hagen	4 July 2003 (age 23)	1.73 m	0	0	(Norway) Storhamar HE
	RB	Thea Ellen Löfstedt	22 December 2007 (age 18)	1.93 m	0	0	(Norway) Oppsal
	CB	Marte Juuhl Svensson	18 February 2001 (age 25)	1.67 m	0	0	(Norway) Storhamar HE
	CB	Ada Aalstad	9 October 2006 (age 20)	1.75 m	0	0	(Norway) Storhamar HE
	CB	Mathea Enger	9 July 2004 (age 22)	1.70 m	0	0	(Norway) Byåsen HE
	LB	Kristin Loraas Eiriksson	26 January 2001 (age 25)	1.85 m	0	0	(Norway) Molde Elite
	LB	Nora Rosenberg	15 March 2005 (age 21)	1.70 m	0	0	(Norway) Tertnes HE
	P	Ingvild Bersås Westersjø	18 June 2000 (age 26)	1.65 m	0	0	(Norway) Tertnes HE
	P	Maja Leinan	10 June 2007 (age 19)	1.84 m	0	0	(Norway) Oppsal
	LW	Torine Hjelme Dalen	5 March 2002 (age 24)	1.66 m	0	0	(Norway) Molde Elite
	LB	Sofia Shauri Dalsveen	9 February 2003 (age 23)	1.83 m	0	0	(Norway) Fredrikstad BK

=== Inaccessible at the moment ===
No.	Pos.	Name	Date of birth (age)	Height	App.	Goals	Club
4	LB	Veronica Kristiansen ^{INJ}	10 July 1990 (age 36)	1.74 m	208	648	(Hungary) Győri ETO KC
6	P	Maren Aardahl ^{PRE}	2 March 1994 (age 32)	1.83 m	91	170	(Denmark) Odense Håndbold
7	RB	Stine Skogrand ^{INJ}	3 March 1993 (age 33)	1.73 m	190	386	(Denmark) Ikast Håndbold
11	RW	Malin Aune ^{PRE}	4 March 1995 (age 31)	1.65 m	119	222	(Norway) Storhamar HE
15	P	Vilde Ingstad ^{INJ}	18 December 1994 (age 31)	1.80 m	151	238	(Hungary) Ferencvárosi TC
31	LB	Kjerstin Boge Solås ^{INJ}	31 December 1997 (age 28)	1.82 m	18	11	(Norway) Storhamar HE
34	LW	Anniken Wollik ^{PRE}	5 December 1997 (age 28)	1.66 m	31	75	(Norway) Molde Elite
43	LB	Martine Kårigstad Andersen ^{INJ}	7 May 2002 (age 24)	1.77 m	1	0	(Norway) Sola HK
	P	Kaja Haugseng ^{INJ}	23 September 2001 (age 25)	1.83 m	6	5	(Norway) Sola HK

Notes

- ^{INJ} = Injured
- ^{PRS} = Preliminary squad
- ^{RET} = Retired from the national team
- ^{SBY} = Standby player
- ^{TOP} = Train-on player
- ^{PRE} = Pregnant or maternity leave

=== Coaching staff ===
Role	Name
Head coach	(Norway) Ole Gjekstad
Assistant coach	(Norway) Tonje Larsen
Goalkeeping coach	(Sweden) Mats Olsson
Doctor	(Norway) Aina Emaus
Doctor	(Norway) Per Olav Hoem Kvalvåg
Doctor	(Norway) Stine Fjerdumsmoen
Physiotherapist	(Norway) Nina A. Markussen
Physiotherapist	(Norway) Thomas Ryther
Physiotherapist	(Norway) Maria Øgreid Leitao
Masseur	(Norway) Petter A. Larsen
Physical trainer	(Norway) Benjamin Jensen
Video analysis	(Norway) Henning Krøger
Coaching resource/analysis	(Norway) Joar Gjerde
Head leader	(Norway) Siv Sødal
Team Administrator	(Norway) Lars Kronborg
Head of social media	(Norway) Benedicte Watne Olsen

=== Past squads ===
1971 World Championship (7th place)

Liv Bjørk, Siri Keul, Sissel Buchholdt, Bjørg Andersen, Eldbjørg Willassen, Karen Fladset, Astri Knudsen Bech, Sigrid Halvorsen, Astrid Skei Høsøien, Unni Anisdahl, Inger-Johanne Tveter, Lille Storberg, Anne Hilmersen, Berit Moen Johansen.

1973 World Championship (8th place)

Liv Bjørk, Siri Keul, Sissel Buchholdt, Bjørg Andersen, Karen Fladset, Kari Aagaard, Astri Knudsen Bech, Sigrid Halvorsen, Unni Anisdahl, Inger-Johanne Tveter, Grethe Tønnesen, Hjørdis Høsøien, Wenche Wensberg, Svanhild Sponberg.

1975 World Championship (8th place)

Liv Bjørk, Siri Keul, Sissel Buchholdt, Marit Breivik, Bjørg Andersen, Kari Aagaard, Astri Knudsen Bech, Unni Anisdahl, Anne Aanestad Winter, Turid Sannes, Hjørdis Høsøien, Wenche Wensberg, Randi Elisabeth Dyrdal, Lisabeth H. Muhrer.

Coach: Frode Kyvåg

1982 World Championship (7th place)

Liv Bjørk, Linn Siri Jensen, Turid Smedsgård, Heidi Sundal, Hanne Hegh, Sissel Buchholdt, Britt Johansen, Kristin Midthun, Marit Breivik, Ingunn Thomassen Berg, Kristin Glosimot Kjeldsberg, Wenche Halvorsen Stensrud, Åse Nygård Pedersen, Ingunn Rise Kirkeby, Susanne Hannestad.

Coach: Karen Fladset

1986 World Championship (Third place)

Kristin Midthun, Heidi Sundal, Trine Haltvik, Ingrid Steen, Åse Birkrem, Cathrine Svendsen, Hanne Hegh (captain), Hanne Hogness, Anne Migliosi, Kristin Eide, Karin Pettersen, Karin Singstad, Unni Birkrem, Linn-Siri Jensen, Kjerstin Andersen.

Coach: Sven-Tore Jacobsen

1988 Summer Olympics (Second place)

Annette Skotvoll, Berit Digre, Cathrine Svendsen, Hanne Hegh (captain), Hanne Hogness, Heidi Sundal, Karin Singstad, Ingrid Steen, Karin Pettersen, Kjerstin Andersen, Kristin Midthun, Susann Goksør, Marte Eliasson, Trine Haltvik, Vibeke Johnsen.

Coach: Sven-Tore Jacobsen

1990 World Championship (6th place)

Kjerstin Andersen, Annette Skotvoll, Reidun Gunnarson, Susann Goksør, Kjersti Grini, Trine Haltvik, Hanne Hegh (captain), Hanne Hogness, Marte Eliasson, Kristin Cecilie Karlsen, Cathrine Svendsen, Tonje Sagstuen, Karin Pettersen, Tone Anne Alvestad Seland.

Coach: Sven-Tore Jacobsen

1992 Summer Olympics (Second place)

Annette Skotvoll, Cathrine Svendsen, Hanne Hogness (captain), Hege Frøseth, Heidi Sundal, Heidi Tjugum, Henriette Henriksen, Ingrid Steen, Karin Pettersen, Kristine Duvholt, Mona Dahle, Siri Eftedal, Susann Goksør, Tonje Sagstuen.

Coach: Sven-Tore Jacobsen

1993 World Championship (Third place)

Cecilie Leganger, Anette Skotvoll, Hege Frøseth, Susann Goksør (captain), Siri Eftedal, Connie Mathisen, Mette Davidsen, Mona Dahle, Marte Eliasson, Kristine Duvholt, Karin Pettersen, Heidi Sundal, Hege Kristine Kvitsand, Tonje Sagstuen, Cathrine Svendsen.

Coach: Sven-Tore Jacobsen

1994 European Championship (Third place)

Cecilie Leganger, Annette Skotvoll, Monica Løken, Tonje Larsen, Kjersti Grini, Tonje Sagstuen, Susann Goksør (captain), Kristine Moldestad, Kristine Duvholt, Marte Eliasson, Kari Solem, Hege Kristine Kvitsand, Mona Dahle, Ingrid Steen, Siri Eftedal.

Coach: Marit Breivik

1995 World Championship (4th place)

Heidi Tjugum, Cecilie Leganger, Annette Skotvoll, Susann Goksør (captain), Mette Davidsen, Kjersti Grini, Ann Cathrin Eriksen, Mona Dahle, Tonje Sagstuen, Tonje Larsen, Hege Kristin Kvitsand, Cathrine Svendsen, Kristine Moldestad.

Coach: Marit Breivik

1996 Summer Olympics (4th place)

Ann Cathrin Eriksen, Annette Skotvoll, Hege Kvitsand, Heidi Tjugum, Hilde Østbø, Kari Solem, Kjersti Grini, Kristine Duvholt, Kristine Moldestad, Mette Davidsen, Mona Dahle, Sahra Hausmann, Susann Goksør (captain), Tonje Larsen, Trine Haltvik.

Coach: Marit Breivik

1996 European Championship (Second place)

Heidi Tjugum, Jeanette Nilsen, Annette Skotvoll, Tonje Larsen, Kjersti Grini, Sahra Hausmann, Susann Goksør (captain), Kari Solem, Monica Vik Hansen, Trine Haltvik, Kristine Moldestad, Mette Davidsen, Janne Tuven, Ellen Thomsen, Silje Bolset.

Coach: Marit Breivik

1997 World Championship (Second place)

Heidi Tjugum, Jeanette Nilsen, Lise Kristiansen, Tonje Sagstuen, Susann Goksør Bjerkrheim (captain), Trine Haltvik, Mette Davidsen, Tonje Larsen, Janne Tuven, Anette Tveter, Kari Solem, Sahra Hausmann, Monica Vik Hansen, Ellen Thomsen.

Coach: Marit Breivik

1998 European Championship (Winner)

Ann Cathrin Eriksen, Camilla Carstens, Cecilie Leganger, Elisabeth Hilmo, Elise Margrete Alsand, Else-Marthe Sørlie Lybekk, Heidi Tjugum, Janne Tuven, Jeanette Nilsen, Kjersti Grini (captain), Mette Davidsen, Mia Hundvin, Sahra Hausmann, Siv Heim Sæbøe, Tonje Larsen, Trine Haltvik.

Coach: Marit Breivik

1999 World Championship (Winner)

Ann Cathrin Eriksen, Birgitte Sættem, Cecilie Leganger, Elisabeth Hilmo, Else-Marthe Sørlie, Heidi Tjugum, Jeanette Nilsen, Kjersti Grini, Kristine Duvholt, Marianne Rokne, Mette Davidsen, Mia Hundvin, Sahra Hausmann, Susann Goksør Bjerkrheim (captain), Tonje Larsen, Trine Haltvik.

Coach: Marit Breivik

2000 Summer Olympics (Third place)

Ann Cathrin Eriksen, Birgitte Sættem, Cecilie Leganger, Elisabeth Hilmo, Else-Marthe Sørlie, Heidi Tjugum, Jeanette Nilsen, Kjersti Grini, Kristine Duvholt, Marianne Rokne, Mia Hundvin, Monica Sandve, Susann Goksør Bjerkrheim (captain), Tonje Larsen, Trine Haltvik.

Coach: Marit Breivik

2000 European Championship (6th place)

Birgitte Sættem, Camilla Carstens, Camilla Thorsen, Cecilie Thorsteinsen, Elisabeth Hilmo, Else-Marthe Sørlie (captain), Gro Hammerseng, Hege Christin Vikebø, Hege Johansen, Jeanette Nilsen, Kristine Duvholt, Marianne Rokne, Mimi Kopperud Slevigen, Karoline Dyhre Breivang, Monica Sandve, Vigdis Hårsaker.

Coach: Marit Breivik

2001 World Championship (Second place)

Cecilie Leganger, Mimi Kopperud Sleivigen, Heidi Halvorsen, Kjersti Grini (captain), Gro Hammerseng, Kristine Duvholt, Janne Tuven, Marianne Rokne, Else Marthe Sørlie, Elisabeth Hilmo, Monica Sandve, Vigdis Hårsaker, Kristine Lunde, Unni Nyhamar Hinkel, Hanne Halén.

Coach: Marit Breivik

2002 European Championship (Second place)

Anette Hovind Johansen, Birgitte Sættem, Elisabeth Hilmo, Else-Marthe Sørlie Lybekk (captain), Gro Hammerseng, Heidi Tjugum Mørk, Janne Tuven, Kari-Anne Henriksen, Katja Nyberg, Katrine Lunde, Lina Olsson Rosenberg, Mia Hundvin, Mimi Kopperud Slevigen, Monica Sandve, Tonje Larsen, Vigdis Hårsaker.

Coach: Marit Breivik

2003 World Championship (6th place)

Heidi Tjugum, Cecilie Leganger, Katrine Lunde, Gro Hammerseng (captain), Unni Nyhamar Hinkel, Elisabeth Hilmo, Vigdis Hårsaker, Berit Hynne, Anette Hovind Johansen, Tonje Larsen, Kristine Lunde, Else-Marthe Sørlie Lybekk, Katja Nyberg, Linn-Kristin Riegelhuth, Monica Sandve, Ragnhild Aamodt.

Coach: Marit Breivik

2004 European Championship (Winner)

Camilla Thorsen, Elisabeth Hilmo, Else-Marthe Sørlie Lybekk, Gro Hammerseng (captain), Gøril Snorroeggen, Isabel Blanco, Kari Mette Johansen, Karoline Dyhre Breivang, Katja Nyberg, Katrine Lunde, Kjersti Beck, Kristine Lunde, Linn-Kristin Riegelhuth, Ragnhild Aamodt, Randi Gustad, Terese Pedersen, Vigdis Hårsaker.

Coach: Marit Breivik

2005 World Championship (9th place)

Anette Hovind Johansen, Camilla Thorsen, Elisabeth Hilmo (captain), Isabel Blanco, Kari Mette Johansen, Karoline Dyhre Breivang, Katrine Lunde, Kjersti Beck, Kristine Lunde, Linn Jørum Sulland, Marianne Rokne, Ragnhild Aamodt, Randi Gustad, Terese Pedersen, Tonje Nøstvold.

Coach: Marit Breivik

2006 European Championship (Winner)

Anette Hovind Johansen, Anne Kjersti Suvdal, Else-Marthe Sørlie Lybekk, Gro Hammerseng (captain), Gøril Snorroeggen, Kari Aalvik Grimsbø, Kari Mette Johansen, Karoline Dyhre Breivang, Katja Nyberg, Katrine Lunde, Kristine Lunde, Linn-Kristin Riegelhuth, Marianne Rokne, Marit Malm Frafjord, Ragnhild Aamodt, Terese Pedersen, Tonje Nøstvold.

Coach: Marit Breivik

2007 World Championship (Second place)

Anette Hovind Johansen, Else-Marthe Sørlie Lybekk, Gro Hammerseng (captain), Gøril Snorroeggen, Kari Aalvik Grimsbø, Kari Mette Johansen, Karoline Dyhre Breivang, Katja Nyberg, Katrine Lunde Haraldsen, Linn Jørum Sulland, Linn-Kristin Riegelhuth, Marit Malm Frafjord, Ragnhild Aamodt, Terese Pedersen, Tonje Nøstvold, Vigdis Hårsaker.

Coach: Marit Breivik

2008 Summer Olympics (Winner)

Else-Marthe Sørlie Lybekk, Gro Hammerseng (captain), Gøril Snorroeggen, Kari Aalvik Grimsbø, Kari Mette Johansen, Karoline Dyhre Breivang, Katja Nyberg, Katrine Lunde Haraldsen, Kristine Lunde, Linn-Kristin Riegelhuth, Marit Malm Frafjord, Ragnhild Aamodt, Tonje Larsen, Tonje Nøstvold.

Coach: Marit Breivik

2008 European Championship (Winner)

Camilla Herrem, Heidi Løke, Isabel Blanco, Kari Aalvik Grimsbø, Kari Mette Johansen, Karoline Dyhre Breivang, Katrine Lunde Haraldsen, Kristine Lunde (captain), Linn Jørum Sulland, Linn-Kristin Riegelhuth, Marit Malm Frafjord, Ragnhild Aamodt, Terese Pedersen, Tine Rustad Kristiansen, Tonje Larsen, Tonje Nøstvold.

Coach: Marit Breivik

2009 World Championship (Third place)

Kari Aalvik Grimsbø, Renate Urne, Ida Alstad, Heidi Løke, Tonje Nøstvold, Karoline Dyhre Breivang, Katrine Lunde Haraldsen, Kristine Lunde-Borgersen (captain), Kari Mette Johansen, Terese Pedersen, Marit Malm Frafjord, Tonje Larsen, Linn-Kristin Riegelhuth, Tine Stange, Anja Edin, Camilla Herrem.

Coach: Thorir Hergeirsson

2010 European Championship (Winner)

Kari Aalvik Grimsbø, Mari Molid, Nora Mørk, Ida Alstad, Heidi Løke, Tonje Nøstvold, Karoline Dyhre Breivang, Gro Hammerseng (captain), Kari Mette Johansen, Marit Malm Frafjord, Tonje Larsen, Katrine Lunde Haraldsen, Linn Jørum Sulland, Linn-Kristin Riegelhuth, Stine Bredal Oftedal, Tine Stange, Camilla Herrem.

Coach: Thorir Hergeirsson

2011 World Championship (Winner)

Kari Aalvik Grimsbø, Mari Molid, Stine Bredal Oftedal, Ida Alstad, Heidi Løke, Tonje Nøstvold, Karoline Dyhre Breivang, Kristine Lunde-Borgersen, Kari Mette Johansen, Marit Malm Frafjord (captain), Gøril Snorroeggen, Katrine Lunde Haraldsen, Linn Jørum Sulland, Linn-Kristin Riegelhuth Koren, Amanda Kurtović, Camilla Herrem.

Coach: Thorir Hergeirsson

2012 Summer Olympics (Winner)

Kari Aalvik Grimsbø, Ida Alstad, Heidi Løke, Tonje Nøstvold, Karoline Dyhre Breivang, Kristine Lunde-Borgersen, Kari Mette Johansen, Marit Malm Frafjord (captain), Gøril Snorroeggen, Katrine Lunde Haraldsen, Linn Jørum Sulland, Linn-Kristin Riegelhuth Koren, Amanda Kurtović, Camilla Herrem.

Coach: Thorir Hergeirsson

2012 European Championship (Second place)

Karoline Næss, Stine Bredal Oftedal, Ida Alstad, Heidi Løke, Karoline Dyhre Breivang, Kristine Lunde-Borgersen, Anja Edin, Silje Solberg, Marit Malm Frafjord (captain), Ida Bjørndalen, Katrine Lunde Haraldsen, Linn Jørum Sulland, Linn-Kristin Riegelhuth Koren, Linn Gossé, Maja Jakobsen, Camilla Herrem.

Coach: Thorir Hergeirsson

2013 World Championship (5th place)

Mari Molid, Stine Bredal Oftedal, Ida Alstad, Heidi Løke, Tonje Nøstvold, Karoline Dyhre Breivang (captain), Isabel Blanco, Anja Hammerseng-Edin, Silje Solberg, Linn Jørum Sulland, Katrine Lunde, Veronica Kristiansen, Linn-Kristin Riegelhuth Koren, Nora Mørk, Camilla Herrem, Sanna Solberg.

Coach: Thorir Hergeirsson

2014 European Championship (Winner)

Kari Aalvik Grimsbø, Betina Riegelhuth, Emilie Hegh Arntzen, Veronica Kristiansen, Ida Alstad, Heidi Løke, Karoline Dyhre Breivang (captain), Nora Mørk, Stine Bredal Oftedal, Silje Solberg, Ida Bjørndalen Karlsson, Emily Stang Sando, Linn-Kristin Riegelhuth Koren, Maja Jakobsen, Camilla Herrem, Sanna Solberg, Pernille Wibe.

Coach: Thorir Hergeirsson

2015 World Championship (Winner)

Kari Aalvik Grimsbø, Mari Molid, Veronica Kristiansen, Ida Alstad, Heidi Løke, Stine Skogrand, Vilde Ingstad, Nora Mørk, Stine Bredal Oftedal (captain), Silje Solberg, Linn Jørum Sulland, Pernille Wibe, Betina Riegelhuth, Amanda Kurtović, Camilla Herrem, Sanna Solberg, Marta Tomac.

Coach: Thorir Hergeirsson

2016 Summer Olympics (Third place)

Kari Aalvik Grimsbø, Mari Molid, Emilie Hegh Arntzen, Veronica Kristiansen, Ida Alstad, Heidi Løke, Nora Mørk, Stine Bredal Oftedal (captain), Marit Malm Frafjord, Katrine Lunde, Linn-Kristin Riegelhuth Koren, Amanda Kurtović, Camilla Herrem, Sanna Solberg.

Coach: Thorir Hergeirsson

2016 European Championship (Winner)

Kari Aalvik Grimsbø, Emilie Hegh Arntzen, Veronica Kristiansen, Stine Skogrand, Vilde Ingstad, Nora Mørk, Stine Bredal Oftedal (captain), Malin Aune, Silje Solberg, Marit Malm Frafjord, Silje Waade, Kjerstin Boge Solås, Amanda Kurtović, Camilla Herrem, Sanna Solberg, Marta Tomac.

Coach: Thorir Hergeirsson

2017 World Championship (Second place)

Kari Aalvik Grimsbø, Emilie Hegh Arntzen, Veronica Kristiansen, Heidi Løke, Stine Skogrand, Vilde Ingstad, Nora Mørk, Stine Bredal Oftedal (captain), Silje Solberg, Kari Brattset, Katrine Lunde, Helene Fauske, Emilie Christensen, Amanda Kurtović, Camilla Herrem, Sanna Solberg, Marit Røsberg Jacobsen.

Coach: Thorir Hergeirsson

2018 European Championship (5th place)

Henny Reistad, Emilie Hegh Arntzen, Veronica Kristiansen, Heidi Løke, Silje Waade, Stine Bredal Oftedal (captain), Malin Aune, Silje Solberg, Kari Brattset, Linn Jørum Sulland, Katrine Lunde, Camilla Herrem, Sanna Solberg, Thea Mørk, Marta Tomac, Marit Røsberg Jacobsen, Vilde Ingstad.

Coach: Thorir Hergeirsson

2019 World Championship (4th place)

Emilie Hegh Arntzen, Heidi Løke, Stine Skogrand, Silje Waade, Stine Bredal Oftedal (captain), Malin Aune, Silje Solberg, Kari Brattset Dale, Andrea Austmo Pedersen, Helene Fauske, Moa Högdahl, Marit Røsberg Jacobsen, Ingvild Bakkerud, Camilla Herrem, Sanna Solberg-Isaksen, Kristine Breistøl, Marta Tomac.

Coach: Thorir Hergeirsson

2020 European Championship (Winner)

Emily Stang Sando, Henny Reistad, Emilie Hegh Arntzen, Veronica Kristiansen, Marit Malm Frafjord, Heidi Løke, Stine Skogrand, Nora Mørk, Stine Bredal Oftedal (captain), Malin Aune, Silje Solberg, Kari Brattset Dale, Katrine Lunde, Marit Røsberg Jacobsen, Camilla Herrem, Sanna Solberg-Isaksen, Kristine Breistøl, Marta Tomac, Rikke Granlund.

Coach: Thorir Hergeirsson

2020 Summer Olympics (Third place)

Henny Reistad, Veronica Kristiansen, Marit Malm Frafjord, Stine Skogrand, Nora Mørk, Stine Bredal Oftedal (captain), Silje Solberg, Kari Brattset Dale, Katrine Lunde, Marit Røsberg Jacobsen, Camilla Herrem, Sanna Solberg-Isaksen, Kristine Breistøl, Marta Tomac, Vilde Johansen.

Coach: Thorir Hergeirsson

2021 World Championship (Winner)

Henny Reistad, Emilie Hegh Arntzen, Veronica Kristiansen, Nora Mørk, Stine Bredal Oftedal (captain), Malin Aune, Silje Solberg, Kari Brattset Dale, Vilde Ingstad, Katrine Lunde, Moa Högdahl, Marit Røsberg Jacobsen, Camilla Herrem, Sanna Solberg-Isaksen, Kristine Breistøl, Emilie Hovden, Rikke Granlund, Maren Aardahl.

Coach: Thorir Hergeirsson

2022 European Championship (Winner)

Marie Davidsen, Emilie Hegh Arntzen, Ragnhild Valle Dahl, Maren Aardahl, Stine Skogrand, Nora Mørk, Stine Bredal Oftedal (captain), Malin Aune, Silje Solberg-Østhassel, Kristine Breistøl, Vilde Ingstad, Katrine Lunde, Kristina Novak, Henny Reistad, Emilie Hovden, Sunniva Næs Andersen, Anniken Wollik, Thale Rushfeldt Deila, Ane Høgseth.

Coach: Thorir Hergeirsson

2023 World Championship (Second place)

Marie Davidsen, Maren Aardahl, Stine Skogrand, Nora Mørk, Stine Bredal Oftedal (captain), Silje Solberg-Østhassel, Kari Brattset Dale, Kristine Breistøl, Vilde Ingstad, Katrine Lunde, Ingvild Bakkerud, Kristina Novak, Camilla Herrem, Sanna Solberg-Isaksen, Henny Reistad, Emilie Hovden, Maja Furu Sæteren, Olivia Lykke Nygaard, Thale Rushfeldt Deila.

Coach: Thorir Hergeirsson

2024 Summer Olympics (Winner)

Veronica Kristiansen, Maren Aardahl, Stine Skogrand, Nora Mørk, Stine Bredal Oftedal (captain), Silje Solberg-Østhassel, Kari Brattset Dale, Kristine Breistøl, Vilde Ingstad, Katrine Lunde, Marit Røsberg Jacobsen, Camilla Herrem, Sanna Solberg-Isaksen, Henny Reistad, Thale Rushfeldt Deila.

Coach: Thorir Hergeirsson

2024 European Championship (Winner)

Anniken Obaidli, Maren Aardahl, Stine Skogrand, Live Rushfeldt Deila, Silje Solberg-Østhassel, Kari Brattset Dale, Kristine Breistøl, Katrine Lunde, Marit Røsberg Jacobsen, Ingvild Bakkerud, Camilla Herrem, Sanna Solberg-Isaksen, Emilie Hovden, Henny Reistad (captain), Thale Rushfeldt Deila, Eli Marie Raasok, Ane Høgseth.

Coach: Thorir Hergeirsson

2025 World Championship (Winner)

Veronica Kristiansen, Anniken Obaidli, Maren Aardahl, Stine Skogrand, Live Rushfeldt Deila, Nora Mørk, Malin Aune, Kristine Breistøl, Vilde Ingstad, Katrine Lunde, Selma Henriksen, Ingvild Bakkerud, Henny Reistad (captain), Emilie Hovden, Thale Rushfeldt Deila, Anniken Wollik, Eli Marie Raasok, June Krogh.

Coach: Ole Gjekstad

=== Coaches ===
- Ørnulf Svartberg (1962–1966)
- Tore Rasch (1966–1973)
- Frode Kyvåg (1974–1978)
- Otto Th. Pedersen (1978–1982)
- Karen Fladset (1982–1984)
- Sven-Tore Jacobsen (1984–1993)
- Marit Breivik (1994–2009)
- Thorir Hergeirsson (2009–2024)
- Ole Gustav Gjekstad (2025–)

=== Captains ===
- Hanne Hegh (World Championship 1986, Olympic Games 1988, World Championship 1990)
- Hanne Hogness (Olympic Games 1992)
- Susann Goksør Bjerkrheim (World Championship 1993, European Championship 1994, World Championship 1995, Olympic Games 1996, European Championship 1996, World Championship 1997, World Championship 1999, Olympic Games 2000)
- Kjersti Grini (European Championship 1998, World Championship 2001)
- Else-Marthe Sørlie Lybekk (European Championship 2000, European Championship 2002)
- Gro Hammerseng (World Championship 2003, European Championship 2004, European Championship 2006, World Championship 2007, Olympic Games 2008, European Championship 2010)
- Elisabeth Hilmo (World Championship 2005)
- Kristine Lunde (European Championship 2008, World Championship 2009)
- Marit Malm Frafjord (World Championship 2011, Olympic Games 2012, European Championship 2012)
- Karoline Dyhre Breivang (World Championship 2013, European Championship 2014)
- Stine Bredal Oftedal (World Championship 2015, Olympic Games 2016, European Championship 2016, World Championship 2017, European Championship 2018, World Championship 2019, European Championship 2020, Olympic Games 2020, World Championship 2021, European Championship 2022, World Championship 2023, Olympic Games 2024)
- Henny Reistad (European Championship 2024, World Championship 2025)

=== Notable players ===
Several Norwegian players have seen their individual performance recognized at international tournaments, either as Most Valuable Player, top scorer or as a member of the All-Star Team.

MVP

- Cecilie Leganger, 1993 World Championship
- Trine Haltvik, 1998 European Championship
- Gro Hammerseng, 2004 and 2006 European Championship
- Katja Nyberg, 2007 World Championship
- Kristine Lunde, 2008 European Championship
- Anja Edin, 2012 European Championship
- Stine Bredal Oftedal, 2017 World Championship
- Kari Brattset Dale, 2021 World Championship
- Henny Reistad, 2022 European Championship; 2023 and 2025 World Championship
- Katrine Lunde, 2024 Summer Olympics

All-Star Team

- Heidi Sundal, 1992 Summer Olympics; 1993 World Championship
- Cecilie Leganger, 1993, 1995, 1999 and 2001 World Championship; 1994 and 1998 European Championship
- Kjersti Grini, 1996 and 2000 Summer Olympics; 1998 European Championship
- Heidi Tjugum, 1996 European Championship; 2000 Summer Olympics
- Tonje Sagstuen, 1997 World Championship
- Kristine Duvholt Havnås, 1999 World Championship
- Lina Olsson Rosenberg, 2002 European Championship
- Gro Hammerseng, 2004, 2006 and 2010 European Championship; 2007 World Championship
- Kari Mette Johansen, 2006 European Championship
- Else-Marthe Sørlie Lybekk, 2008 Summer Olympics
- Katrine Lunde, 2008 and 2020 Summer Olympics; 2008, 2010 and 2012 European Championship; 2017 and 2025 World Championship
- Linn-Kristin Riegelhuth, 2008 European Championship; 2009 World Championship
- Tonje Larsen, 2008 European Championship
- Kristine Lunde, 2008 European Championship
- Camilla Herrem, 2009 and 2019 World Championship; 2016 and 2020 European Championship
- Heidi Løke, 2010, 2012 and 2014 European Championship; 2011 and 2015 World Championship; 2012 and 2016 Summer Olympics
- Kari Aalvik Grimsbø, 2012 and 2016 Summer Olympics
- Nora Mørk, 2014, 2016 and 2020 European Championship; 2015, 2017 and 2021 World Championship
- Silje Solberg, 2014 European Championship
- Stine Bredal Oftedal, 2015 and 2023 World Championship; 2018, 2020 and 2022 European Championship; 2024 Summer Olympics
- Henny Reistad, 2021 World Championship, 2024 European Championship
- Kari Brattset Dale, 2024 Summer Olympics
- Emilie Hovden, 2025 World Championship

Top scorers

- Kjersti Grini, 1996 European Championship (48 goals), 2000 Summer Olympics (61 goals)
- Linn-Kristin Riegelhuth, 2008 European Championship (51 goals)
- Nora Mørk, 2016 Summer Olympics (62 goals), 2016 European Championship (53 goals), 2017 World Championship (66 goals), 2020 European Championship (52 goals), 2020 Summer Olympics (52 goals), 2022 European Championship (50 goals)
- Henny Reistad, 2025 World Championship (55 goals)

=== Individual all-time records ===
Still active national team players are highlighted

==== Most matches played ====
Total number of matches played in official competitions only.

#	Player	Matches	Goals
1	Katrine Lunde	389	3
2	Camilla Herrem	332	951
3	Karoline Dyhre Breivang	305	475
4	Susann Goksør Bjerkrheim	296	844
5	Linn-Kristin Riegelhuth Koren	279	971
6	Stine Oftedal Dahmke	269	757
6	Heidi Sundal	269	731
8	Tonje Larsen	264	567
9	Annette Skotvoll	250	2
10	Karin Pettersen Ryen	244	546

Last updated: 12 April 2026
Source: handball.no

==== Most goals scored ====
Total number of goals scored in official matches only.

#	Player	Goals	Matches	Average
1	Kjersti Grini	1003	201	4.99
2	Linn-Kristin Riegelhuth Koren	971	279	3.48
3	Nora Mørk	958	207	4.63
4	Camilla Herrem	951	332	2.86
5	Cathrine Roll-Matthiesen	921	234	3.93
6	Susann Goksør Bjerkrheim	844	296	2.85
7	Trine Haltvik	834	241	3.46
8	Heidi Løke	801	226	3.54
9	Stine Oftedal Dahmke	757	269	2.81
10	Heidi Sundal	731	269	2.77

Last updated: 27 September 2026
Source: handball.no

==== Most championships played ====
Total number of championships played.

#	Player	Championships	Career
1	Katrine Lunde	25	2002–2026
2	Camilla Herrem	20	2006–2024
3	Stine Oftedal Dahmke	17	2010–2024
4	Silje Solberg-Østhassel	15	2011–
5	Karoline Dyhre Breivang	14	2000–2014
5	Tonje Larsen	14	1992–2010
5	Heidi Løke	14	2006–2020
5	Linn-Kristin Riegelhuth Koren	14	2003–2016
5	Sanna Solberg-Isaksen	14	2010–
5	Nora Mørk	14	2010–

Last updated: 2025 World Championship

==== Most medals ====
OG: Olympic Games, WC: World Championship, EC: European Championship

#	Player	OG	WC	EC	Total
1	Katrine Lunde	3 (gold) 2 (bronze)	3 (gold) 3 (silver) 1 (bronze)	7 (gold) 2 (silver)	21
2	Camilla Herrem	2 (gold) 2 (bronze)	3 (gold) 2 (silver) 1 (bronze)	6 (gold) 1 (silver)	17
3	Stine Oftedal Dahmke	1 (gold) 2 (bronze)	3 (gold) 2 (silver)	5 (gold) 1 (silver)	14
4	Nora Mørk	1 (gold) 2 (bronze)	3 (gold) 2 (silver)	5 (gold)	13
4	Kari Aalvik Grimsbø	2 (gold) 1 (bronze)	2 (gold) 2 (silver) 1 (bronze)	5 (gold)	13
4	Marit Malm Frafjord	2 (gold) 2 (bronze)	1 (gold) 1 (silver) 1 (bronze)	5 (gold) 1 (silver)	13
7	Linn-Kristin Riegelhuth Koren	2 (gold) 1 (bronze)	1 (gold) 1 (silver) 1 (bronze)	5 (gold) 1 (silver)	12
7	Silje Solberg-Østhassel	1 (gold) 1 (bronze)	2 (gold) 2 (silver)	5 (gold) 1 (silver)	12
9	Karoline Dyhre Breivang	2 (gold)	1 (gold) 1 (silver) 1 (bronze)	5 (gold) 1 (silver)	11
9	Sanna Solberg-Isaksen	1 (gold) 2 (bronze)	2 (gold) 2 (silver)	4 (gold)	11
9	Heidi Løke	1 (gold) 1 (bronze)	2 (gold) 1 (silver) 1 (bronze)	4 (gold) 1 (silver)	11
9	Tonje Larsen	1 (gold) 1 (bronze)	1 (gold) 1 (silver) 1 (bronze)	3 (gold) 2 (silver) 1 (bronze)	11

Last updated: 2025 World Championship

==== Most goals scored in a single match ====
Players with the most goals in official matches only.

#	Player	Goals	Against	Date	Tournament
1	Henny Reistad	15	Denmark	15 December 2023	2023 World Championship
2	Nora Mørk	14	Russia	18 August 2016	2016 Summer Olympics
2	Kjersti Grini	14	Australia	2 December 1999	1999 World Championship
3	Janne Tuven	13	Poland	9 March 1997	Friendly tournament
4	Stine Skogrand	12	Romania	20 March 2021	Qualification for the 2020 Summer Olympics
4	Linn-Kristin Riegelhuth Koren	12	Hungary	7 April 2006	Friendly match
4	Trine Haltvik	12	Romania	1 November 1997	Friendly match
4	Ingrid Steen	12	Russia	21 December 1985	World Women's Handball Championship Level B
5	Camilla Herrem	11	Slovenia	10 October 2021	EHF EURO Cup
5	Kari Brattset Dale	11	South Korea	25 July 2021	2020 Summer Olympics
5	Ida Alstad	11	Montenegro	16 December 2012	2012 European Championship
5	Linn Jørum Sulland	11	South Korea	1 August 2012	2012 Summer Olympics
5	Kristine Lunde-Borgersen	11	Netherlands	12 December 2005	2005 World Championship
5	Vigdis Hårsaker	11	Germany; Germany	9 December 2003; 26 October 2003	2003 World Championship; Friendly tournament
5	Lina Olsson Rosenberg	11	Russia	8 December 2002	2002 European Championship
5	Kristine Duvholt Havnås	11	Austria	11 November 1999	Friendly tournament
5	Tonje Sagstuen	11	Ivory Coast; Sweden	6 December 1995; 17 September 1994	1995 World Championship; 1994 European Championship
5	Hanne Hegh	11	Romania	12 December 1986	1986 World Championship
5	Cathrine Roll-Matthiesen	11	Netherlands; Germany	5 November 1986; 27 June 1986	Polar Cup; Friendly tournament

Last updated: 15 December 2023
Source: handball.no
