= Anne Aanestad Winter =

Norwegian handball player

Personal information
- Nationality: Norwegian

Sport
- Sport: Handball
National team
Years	Team	Apps	(Gls)
1974–1977	Norway	55	(63)

Anne Aanestad Winter is a Norwegian handball player. She played 55 matches for the Norway women's national handball team between 1974 and 1977. She participated at the 1975 World Women's Handball Championship, where the Norwegian team placed 8th.
