= Susanne Hannestad =

Norwegian handball player

Personal information
- Nationality: Norwegian
- Born: 1961 (age 64–65)

Sport
- Sport: Handball
National team
Years	Team	Apps	(Gls)
1979–1983	Norway	43	(47)

Susanne Hannestad (born 1961) is a Norwegian handball player. She played 43 matches for the Norwegian national team between 1979 and 1983. She participated at the 1982 World Women's Handball Championship, where the Norwegian team placed seventh.
