= Tonje Larsen =

Norwegian handball player (born 1975)

Personal information
- Nationality: Norwegian
- Born: 26 January 1975 (age 51) Tønsberg, Norway
- Height: 182 cm (72 in)

Sport
- Sport: Handball
- Position: Center Back
- Current club: Retired

Senior clubs
- Years: Team
- 1993–1998: Larvik HK
- 1998–1999: Viborg HK
- 1999–2015: Larvik HK
National team
Years	Team	Apps	(Gls)
1992–2010	Norway	264	(567)
Medal record
Olympic Games
Gold medal – first place	2008 Beijing	Team
Bronze medal – third place	2000 Sydney	Team
World Championship
Gold medal – first place	1999 Denmark/Norway	Team
Silver medal – second place	1997 Germany	Team
Bronze medal – third place	2009 China	Team
European Championship
Gold medal – first place	1998 Netherlands	Team
Gold medal – first place	2008 Macedonia	Team
Gold medal – first place	2010 Denmark/Norway	Team
Silver medal – second place	1996 Denmark	Team
Silver medal – second place	2002 Denmark	Team
Bronze medal – third place	1994 Germany	Team
- Updated on 19 December 2010

Tonje Larsen (born 26 January 1975) is a retired Norwegian handballer who played for the Norwegian national team. She is Olympic champion, World champion and three times European champion. As a club player she is several times Norwegian champion and once Danish champion, and has won the EHF Cup, EHF Cup Winners' Cup and the EHF Champions League.

== Personal life ==
Larsen was born in Tønsberg on 26 January 1975.

== International championships ==
Larsen made her debut with the national team in June 1992 against Denmark, seventeen years old, when Sven-Tore Jacobsen was head coach. Her first major tournament came when Marit Breivik selected her for the 1994 European Championship in Germany, where she won a bronze medal. She continued playing for the national team and received medals in the three major competitions for women's handball: gold in the 1998 European Championship, gold in the 1999 World Championship and bronze at the 2000 Summer Olympics in Sydney.

Due to jumper's knee, she was out of the team in 2001 and between 2003 and 2008. She continued playing for Larvik mostly on defense, as her knees could not tolerate the heavier stress of the offensive game. Her career seemed to be in danger, and she considered retiring. Finally, she underwent surgery successfully in 2006. As a side effect of the years she spent injured, Larsen is now considered to be an excellent defense player.

She made her comeback to the national team in 2008, winning a gold medal both at the Summer Olympics in Beijing and at the European Championship held in December in the Republic of Macedonia, where she also made the official All-Star Team as the Best left back of the championship.

As of January 2009, she has played more than 200 matches for the national team, and scored more than 500 goals.

== Club career ==
Larsen started playing handball for her hometown club Tønsberg Turn. She was recruited to Larvik HK when Marit Breivik coached the club, and has later played for Larvik, except one year with the Danish club Viborg HK, in the 1998/1999 season. With Viborg she won the Danish championship as well as the Women's EHF Cup.

With Larvik HK she won the EHF Cup Winners' Cup in 2004/2005, and again in 2007/2008. She reached the semi-final of the Women's EHF Champions League in 2002 and in 2004, and reached the final at the Women's EHF Cup in 1996. She won the Norwegian national championship title with Larvik HK in 1996, 1998, 2000, 2003, 2004, 2005, 2006 and 2007. She has won the Norwegian top League with Larvik ten times, in 1994, 1997, 2000, 2001, 2002, 2003, 2005, 2006, 2007 and 2008.

== Awards and recognitions ==
Larsen was awarded the Håndballstatuetten trophy from the Norwegian Handball Federation in 2016, for her overall career.

Her individual awards also include:

- Player of the year 2002 in the Norwegian League
- Player of the year 2003 in the Norwegian League
- Selected into the All-star-team as Best left back at the 2008 European championship
