= Cathrine Roll-Matthiesen =

Norwegian handball player (born 1967)

Personal information
- Full name: Cathrine Roll-Matthiesen
- Nationality: Norwegian
- Born: September 23, 1967 (age 59) Porsgrunn, Norway
- Height: 1.82 m (6 ft 0 in)

Sport
- Sport: Handball
- Current club: Retired

Senior clubs
- Years: Team
- –: IF Borg
- –: IL Vestar
- –: Lunner IL
- 1994–1995: Bouillargues
- 1995–1996: Larvik HK
- 1998: Tertnes Håndball
- –: Tjølling IF
National team
Years	Team	Apps	(Gls)
1985–1996	Norway	234	(921)
Medal record
Olympic Games
Silver medal – second place	1988 Seoul	Team
Silver medal – second place	1992 Barcelona	Team
World Women's Handball Championship
Bronze medal – third place	1986 Netherlands	Team
Bronze medal – third place	1993 Norway	Team

Cathrine Roll-Matthiesen, née Svendsen (born 23 September 1967, in Porsgrunn) is a Norwegian former handball player.

She played in the clubs IF Borg, IL Vestar, Lunner IL, Bouillargues (France), Larvik HK, Tertnes Håndball and Tjølling IF. Between 1985 and 1996 she played in 233 matches for the Norwegian National team, scoring 918 goals.
