= Mia Hundvin =

Norwegian handball player (born 1977)

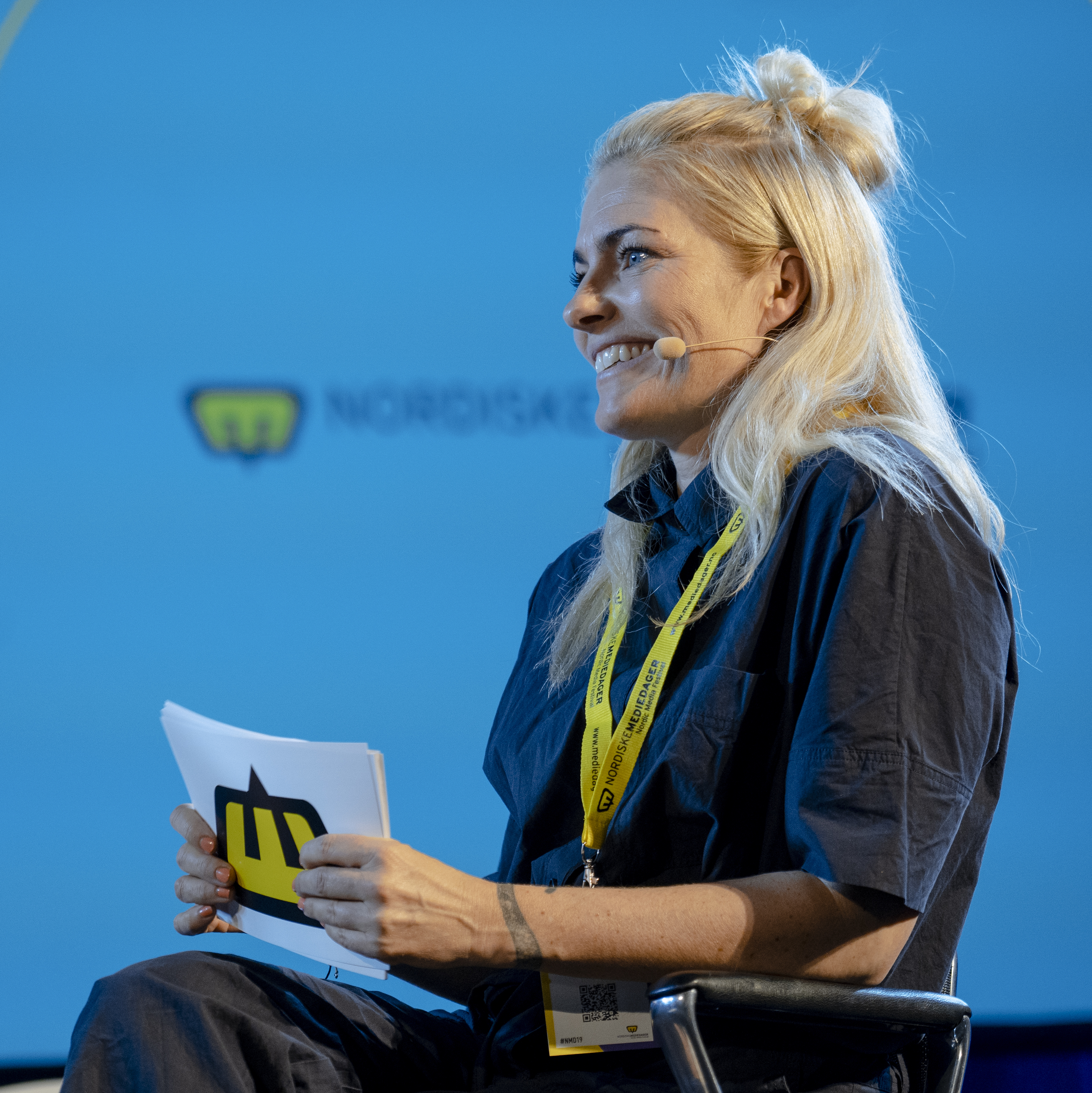
- Hundvin in 2019

Personal information
- Full name: Mia Terese Hundvin
- Nationality: Norwegian
- Born: 7 March 1977 (age 49) Bergen, Norway
- Height: 1.65 m (5 ft 5 in)

Sport
- Sport: Handball
- Position: Left wing

Senior clubs
- Years: Team
- 1986–1989: Løv-Ham
- 1989–1996: Tertnes HE
- 1996–1997: Gjerpen IF
- 1997–2000: Tertnes IL
- 2000–2001: FIF
- 2001–2003: Slagelse DT
- 2003–2004: Aalborg DH
- 2004–2008: Nordstrand IF
National team
Years	Team	Apps	(Gls)
1998–2002	Norway	72	(174)
Medal record
Olympic Games
Bronze medal – third place	2000 Sydney	Team
World Women's Handball Championship
Gold medal – first place	1999 Denmark/Norway
European Women's Handball Championship
Gold medal – first place	1998 Netherlands
Silver medal – second place	2002 Denmark

Mia Terese Hundvin (born 7 March 1977) is a Norwegian former handball player.

== Career ==
Hundvin played 72 matches for Norway's national handball team in addition to playing for professional clubs. She was part of national teams that won the European Women's Handball Championship in 1998, the World Women's Handball Championship in 1999, and Olympic bronze in 2000. Hundvin scored the game-winner as Norway beat South Korea, 22–21.

She became pregnant by partner Terje Håkonsen in 2003, which interrupted her playing for the Danish team Aalborg DH. In addition to her handball career, Hundvin has been training to be a photographer and works for Danish television.

In 2002, she starred in an episode in the Danish sitcom Langt fra Las Vegas. The episode is called "Mia Hundvin".

== Personal life ==
In 2000, she entered a registered partnership with Danish handball player Camilla Andersen, but the couple split three years later. Sports Illustrated ran a lengthy feature on the two, who are much-discussed celebrities in their countries. According to Sports Illustrated, Andersen had been the lover of handball legend Anja Andersen after they won the gold for Denmark in 1996.

After her split from Andersen, Hundvin moved in with Norwegian snowboarder Terje Håkonsen, the world's top snowboarder in the 1990s. They had two children. However, they split when their children were 8 and 11 years old. Hundvin is now enganged to Jørgen Høst.

Hundvin has the latest years participated in several reality-TV shows, like 71 grader nord kjendis in 2020 and Ikke lov å le på hytta in 2021. In 2024 she was a finalist on The Traitors on TV 2.

== See also ==
- Eirik Hundvin, her father
