= Birgitte Sættem =

Norwegian handball player (born 198)

Personal information
- Full name: Birgitte Sættem Jomaas
- Nationality: Norwegian
- Born: 9 July 1978 (age 48) Molde, Norway
- Height: 178 cm (70 in)

Sport
- Sport: Handball
- Position: Left back
- Current club: Retired

Senior clubs
- Years: Team
- 1997–1998: Sportsklubben Rival
- 1998–2006: Larvik HK
National team
| Years | Team | Apps | (Gls) |
| 1998–2003 | Norway | 81 | (165) |
Medal record
Olympic Games
| Bronze medal – third place | 2000 Sydney | Team |
World Women's Handball Championship
| Gold medal – first place | 1999 Denmark/Norway |
European Women's Handball Championship
| Silver medal – second place | 2002 Denmark |

Birgitte Sættem (born July 9, 1978 in Molde) is a retired Norwegian handball player and Olympic medalist and World Champion. She received a bronze medal at the 2000 Summer Olympics in Sydney with the Norwegian national team. At the 1999 World Championship at home soil she won a gold medal.

== Playing career ==
She started playing handball at her hometown club Sportsklubben Rival. In 1997 she joined the Norwegian top league team Larvik HK. Here she won the Norwegian championship and Norwegian cup 5 times each, as well as the EHF Cup Winners' Cup in 2005. In 2003 she missed the World Championship due to a shoulder injury. The shoulder injury would continued to affect her for the rest of her career. She retired in 2006, partly due to injuries and partly due to pregnancy.

== Coaching ==
In 2009 she became a youth coach at Flint Tønsberg. After 4 months she took over the first team, which played in the 2. Division.

== Private life ==
She is married to former Norwegian handball player Geir Jomaas, and they have three kids together.
