= Berit Moen Johansen =

Norwegian handball player

Personal information
- Nationality: Norwegian

Sport
- Sport: Handball
National team
Years	Team	Apps	(Gls)
1967–1971	Norway	33	(10)

Berit Moen Johansen is a Norwegian handball player. She played 33 matches for the Norway women's national handball team between 1967 and 1971. She participated at the 1971 World Women's Handball Championship, where the Norwegian team placed 7th.
