= Liv Bjørk =

Norwegian handball player

Personal information
- Nationality: Norwegian
- Born: 1946 (age 79–80)

Sport
- Sport: Handball
- Position: Goalkeeper

Senior clubs
- Years: Team
- -1968: Strömm IL
- 1968-1970: Frigg Oslo FK
- 1970-1979: Glassverket IF
- 1979-1983: Bækkelagets SK
National team
Years	Team	Apps	(Gls)
1969–1982	Norway	126	(0)

Liv Bjørk (born 1946) is a Norwegian handball goalkeeper. She played 126 matches for the Norway women's national handball team between 1969 and 1982. She participated at the 1971, 1973, 1975 and 1982 World Women's Handball Championship.

Bjørk was awarded the Håndballstatuetten trophy from the Norwegian Handball Federation in 2010.
