= Unni Anisdahl =

Norwegian handball player (born 1947)

Personal information
- Nationality: Norwegian
- Born: 27 September 1947 (age 79)

Sport
- Sport: Handball

Senior clubs
- Years: Team
- –: Harstad IL
- –: IL Vestar
National team
Years	Team	Apps	(Gls)
1971–1977	Norway	72	(58)

Unni Marie Anisdahl (born 27 September 1947) is a Norwegian former handball player, and later sports reporter for the Norwegian Broadcasting Corporation.

She was born in Harstad. She got work as a sports journalist and was a radio sports reporter in NRK.

Anisdahl started playing handball at Harstad IL, and later played for IF Sturla, IL Vestar, Ull/Kisa IL and Årvoll IL. She won six straight league championship with Vestar from 1972 through 1977, and two cup championships in 1972 and 1977. She was a playing head coach in lower leagues of Ull/Kisa from 1978 to 1982 and Årvoll from 1983 to 1984.

Anisdahl played 72 matches for the national handball team in the 1970s, including the 1971, 1973 and 1975 World Women's Handball Championships.
