= Sissel Buchholdt =

Norwegian handball player (born 1951)

Personal information
- Nationality: Norwegian
- Born: 17 June 1951 (age 75) Levanger, Norway

Sport
- Sport: Handball

Senior clubs
- Years: Team
- –: Ronglan IL
- –: SK Freidig
- –: Skogn IL
National team
Years	Team	Apps	(Gls)
1969–1984	Norway	186	(415)

Sissel Karin Buchholdt, née Brenne (born 17 June 1951) is a Norwegian handball player.

== Personal life ==
Buchholdt was born in Levanger, as Sissel Karin Brenne, on 17 June 1951.

== Handball career ==
Buchholdt played for the clubs Ronglan IL, SK Freidig and Skogn IL. She played 186 matches for the Norway women's national handball team, scoring 415 goals, from 1969 to 1984. She participated at the 1971, 1973, 1975 and 1982 World Women's Handball Championships.

Buchholdt was awarded the Håndballstatuetten trophy from the Norwegian Handball Federation in 1999.

== Athletics career ==
She also competed in javelin throw at a national level. Representing the club IL Nybrott, she won a silver medal at the Norwegian championships in 1972 and a bronze medal in 1973. Her personal best throw was 46.84 metres, achieved in May 1974 at Bislett stadion.
