= Hjørdis Høsøien =

Norwegian handball player

Personal information
- Nationality: Norwegian

Sport
- Sport: Handball
National team
Years	Team	Apps	(Gls)
1966–1975	Norway	54	(21)

Hjørdis Høsøien is a Norwegian handball player. She played 54 matches for the Norway women's national handball team between 1966 and 1975. She participated at the 1973 and 1975 World Women's Handball Championship.
