= Ole Gustav Gjekstad =

Norwegian handball player (born 1967)

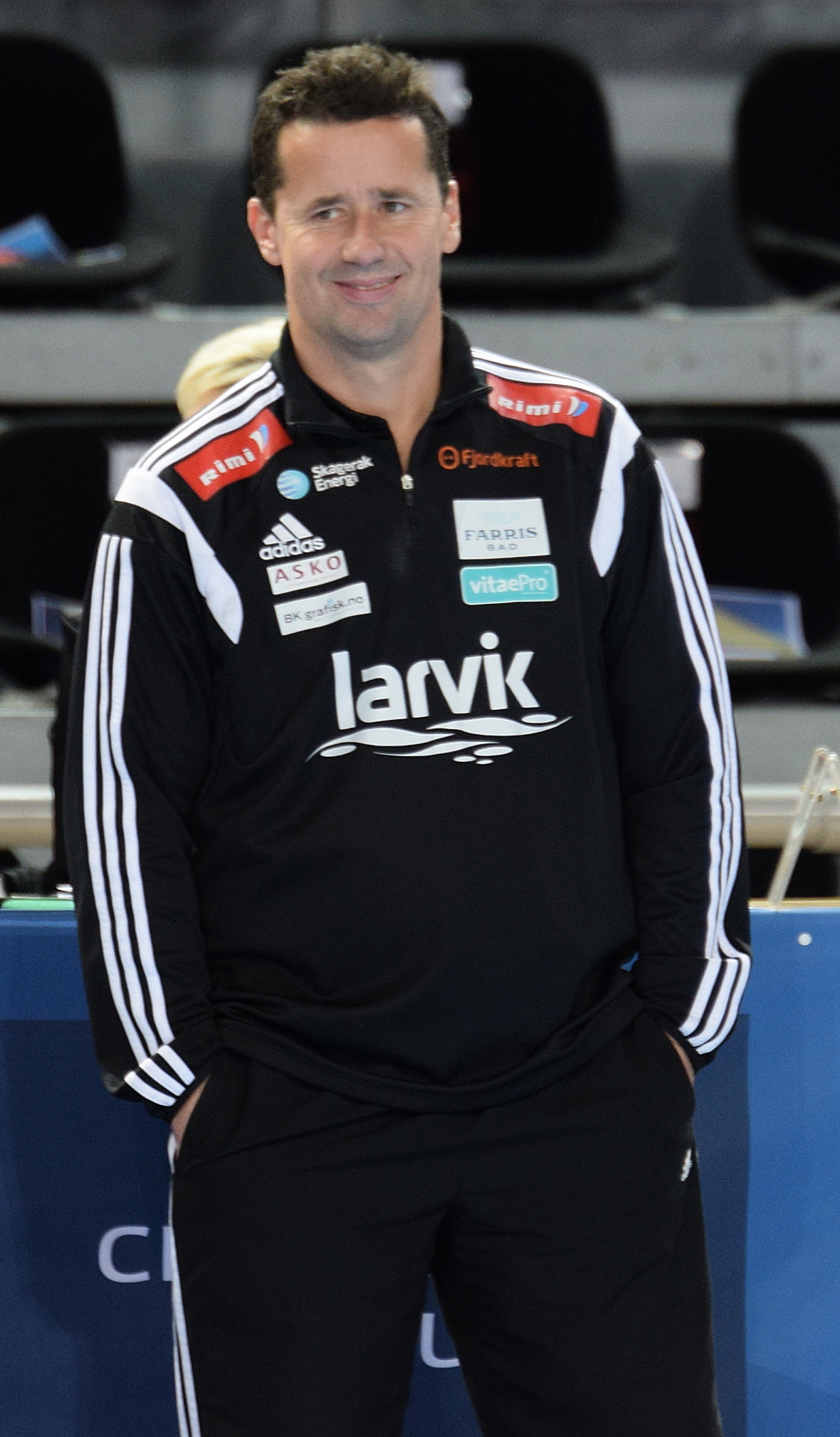
- Ole Gustav Gjekstad (2014)

Personal information
- Nationality: Norwegian
- Born: 29 November 1967 (age 58) Sandefjord, Norway

Sport
- Sport: Handball
- Position: Right wing

Senior clubs
- Years: Team
- –: Sandefjord HK
- 1995–1996: BSV Borba Luzern
National team
| Years | Team | Apps | (Gls) |
| 1986–1995 | Norway | 151 | (561) |

Teams managed
- 1998–2005: Larvik HK
- 2005–2008: Drammen HK
- 2011–2015: Larvik HK
- 2018–2023: Vipers Kristiansand
- 2023–2025: Odense Håndbold
- 2025–: Norway (women)

Ole Gustav Gjekstad (born 29 November 1967) is a former Norwegian handball player and current head coach of the Norwegian national handball team.

As player he won the Norwegian league and cup with Sandefjord HK, and he scored more than five hundred goals for the Norway men's national handball team.

His achievements as coach include winning national titles, the EHF cup and the Women's EHF Champions League with Larvik HK, and leading the Women's club Vipers Kristiansand to national titles and victories in the Women's EHF Champions League.

== Playing career ==
Born on 29 November 1967, Gjekstad spent most of his playing career with Sandefjord HK, and won the Norwegian league and the cup with this club. From 1994 to 1996 he played for the Swiss club BSV Borba Luzern.

He played 151 matches and scored 561 goals for the Norway men's national handball team between 1986 and 1995. He participated at the 1993 World Men's Handball Championship.

Gjekstad was awarded the Håndballstatuetten trophy from the Norwegian Handball Federation in 2011.

== Coaching career ==
Gjekstad coached women's club Larvik HK 1998–2005. and again from 2011–2015. Larvik HK won the 2004–05 EHF Women's Cup Winners' Cup and the 2010–11 EHF Women's Champions League with Gjekstad.

With Gjekstad, Larvik HK won the Norwegian League ten times, and won eight national titles. The club placed second in the EHF Women's Champions League in 2013 and 2015, and reached the semi final in 2002, 2004 and 2012.

From 2005 to 2008, he coached the men’s club Drammen HK. During this period Drammen HK won the Norwegian league twice and once the Norwegian cup.

From 2018 to 2023, he was coaching Vipers Kristiansand. With Vipers he won the Norwegian women's league in 2019, 2020, 2021, 2022 and 2023, and the Women's EHF Champions League in 2021, 2022 and 2023. In 2023 he became the head coach of Odense Håndbold on a three year contract. Here he won the 2024-25 Danish Championship by managing the team to a perfect 26 wins out of 26 in the regular season and then beating Team Esbjerg in the finals. This resulted in him being named Danish Women's Coach of the year by Dansk Håndbold.

On 1 October 2024, Gjekstad was named the new head coach of the Norwegian women's national team, starting January 1, 2025, following the end of the contract of Þórir Hergeirsson. His first major international tournament with the national team was the 2025 World Women's Handball Championship. Norway won gold medals, winning every single match except the final against Germany with nine or more goals. His team was in many ways a continuation of Hergeirsson's team, with most players being former world champions, including Reistad, Lunde, Mørk and, Skogrand among others.

== Honours ==
- EHF Champions League Best coach: 2021
