= Tveten =

Tveten is a Norwegian surname. Notable people with the surname include:

- Alf Tveten (1912–1997), Norwegian sailor
- Olav Tveten (1907–1980), Norwegian architect

== See also ==
- Tveter
