= Bjørg Andersen =

Norwegian handball player (born 1942)

Bjørg Andersen (born 15 June 1942 in Borge, Norway) is a Norwegian handball player, who played for the clubs Skjeberg IF, Østsiden IL and Lisleby FK. She won the Norwegian Championship in indoor handball in 1969, and the Norwegian outdoor championship in 1964, 1966 and 1968. She played 143 matches on the Norway women's national handball team from 1960 to 1977. She participated at the 1971, 1973 and 1975 World Women's Handball Championships.

She is the mother of football manager Jørn Andersen and grandmother of former Werder Bremen player Niklas Andersen.

Andersen was awarded the Håndballstatuetten trophy from the Norwegian Handball Federation in 2000.
