= Ragnhild Aamodt =

Norwegian handball player (born 1980)

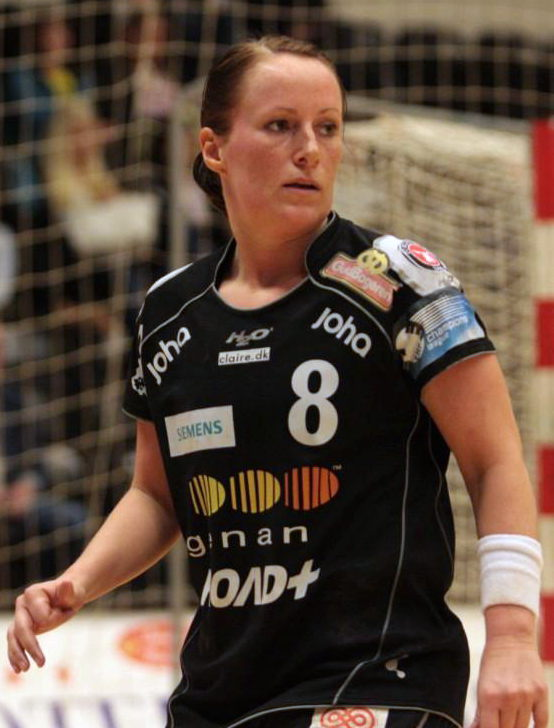

Personal information
- Full name: Ragnhild Margrethe Aamodt
- Nationality: Norwegian
- Born: 9 September 1980 (age 46) Sarpsborg, Norway
- Height: 1.63 m (5 ft 4 in)

Sport
- Sport: Handball
- Position: Right wing
- Current club: Retired

Senior clubs
- Years: Team
- –2003: Skjeberg HK
- 2003–2005: GOG Svendborg
- 2005–2009: FC Midtjylland
- 2009–2012: Sarpsborg IL
National team
Years	Team	Apps	(Gls)
2002–2009	Norway	133	(314)
Medal record
Olympic Games
Gold medal – first place	2008 Beijing	Team
World Championship
Silver medal – second place	2007 France	Team
European Championship
Gold medal – first place	2004 Hungary	Team
Gold medal – first place	2006 Sweden	Team
Gold medal – first place	2008 Macedonia	Team

Ragnhild Margrethe Aamodt (born 9 September 1980) is a Norwegian former handball player. She retired in 2012, while playing for the Norwegian 2nd tier club Sarpsborg. Until March 2009 she also played for the Norwegian national team.

== Life and career ==
Born in Sarpsborg on 9 September 1980, Aamodt made her debut on the Norwegian national team in 2002, and played 133 matches and scored 314 goals until her retirement in March 2009. She is a 3 time European champion, from 2004 to 2008. She received a silver medal at the 2007 World Women's Handball Championship and a gold medal at the 2008 Summer Olympics in Beijing.
