= Mimi Kopperud Slevigen =

Norwegian handball player (born 1977)

Medal record

Representing Norway

Women's handball

World Championship
Silver medal – second place	2001 Italy	Team

European Championship
Silver medal – second place	2002 Denmark	Team

Mimi-Johanne Kopperud Slevigen (born 1 February 1977) is a Norwegian team handball player.

== Biography ==
Born on 1 February 1977, Slevigen played for the club Larvik HK in the Women's EHF Champions League from 2000 to 2004. She made her debut on the Norway women's national handball team in 1999, and played 59 matches for the national team. She won a silver medal at the World Women's Handball Championship in 2001, and a silver medal at the European Championship in 2002.

She resides in Trømborg.
