= Kari Mette Johansen =

Norwegian handball player (born 1979)

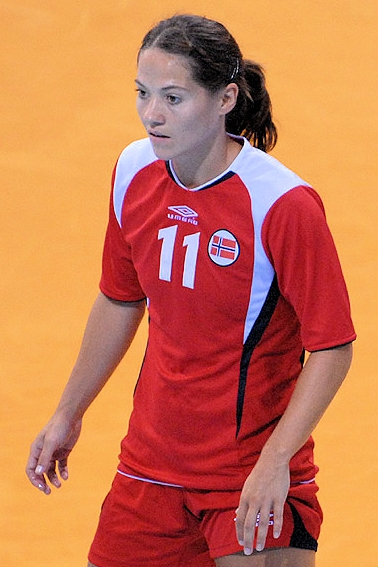
- Kari Mette Johansen during the Olympic Games in Beijing 2008.

Personal information
- Nationality: Norwegian
- Born: 11 January 1979 (age 47) Fredrikstad
- Height: 172 cm (68 in)

Sport
- Sport: Handball
- Position: Left wing
- Current club: Retired

Youth career
- Years: Team
- 1987–1997: Lisleby
- 1997–1998: Skjeberg HK

Senior clubs
- Years: Team
- 1998–2014: Larvik HK
National team
Years	Team	Apps	(Gls)
2004–2012	Norway	203	(493)
Medal record
Women's handball
Representing Norway
Olympic Games
Gold medal – first place	2008 Beijing	Team
Gold medal – first place	2012 London	Team
World Championship
Gold medal – first place	2011 Brazil	Team
Silver medal – second place	2007 France	Team
Bronze medal – third place	2009 China	Team
European Championship
Gold medal – first place	2004 Hungary	Team
Gold medal – first place	2006 Sweden	Team
Gold medal – first place	2008 Macedonia	Team
Gold medal – first place	2010 Denmark/Norway	Team

Kari Mette Johansen (born 11 January 1979) is a Norwegian team handball player, a two time Olympic champion, once a world champion and four times European champion. She was voted into the All star team at the 2006 European Women's Handball Championship, where she won gold medal with the Norwegian National Team.

== Career ==
Born in Fredrikstad on 11 January 1979, Kari Mette Johansen played for the Norwegian club Larvik HK her entire senior career. With Larvik she won 12 Norwegian Championships, 11 Norwegian Cups and the 2010-11 Champions League. She also won two EHF Cup Winners' Cups. She retired in 2014 after 16 seasons and 552 matches for the club. After retirement she was made an honorary member at Larvik HK.

=== National team ===
She made her debut on the national team in 2004, where she played 203 matches and scored 493 goals. At her first major international tournament, she won gold medals at the 2004 European Championship.

She won Olympic gold medals in 2008 and 2012.

At the 2006 European Championship, she won gold medals with Norway, and was selected for the tournament all-star team. In the final against Russia, she scored 9 goals from 9 shots.

At the 2007 Championship she won silver medals, losing the France in the final. The year after she won her third European gold at the 2008 European Championship. At the 2011 World Championship she won a gold medal. Her last major international tournament was the 2010 European Championship, where she won her 4th gold medal from four tournaments.

She retired from the national team in 2012. She was awarded the trophy Håndballstatuetten from the Norwegian Handball Federation in 2018.

== Titles ==
- Norwegian League
  - Gold: 99/00, 00/01, 01/02, 02/03, 04/05, 05/06, 06/07, 07/08, 08/09, 09/10, 10/11, 11/12, 12/13, 13/14
- Norwegian Women's Handball Cup
  - Gold: 99/00, 02/03, 03/04, 04/05, 2005, 2006, 2008, 2009, 2010, 2011, 2012, 2013, 2014
- EHF Champions League
  - Gold: 2011
  - Silver: 2013
- EHF Cup Winners' Cup
  - Gold: 2005, 2008
  - Silver: 2009
