= Monica Sandve =

Norwegian handball player (born 1973)

Personal information
- Nationality: Norwegian
- Born: 3 December 1973 (age 52) Stavanger, Norway
- Height: 168 cm (66 in)

Sport
- Sport: Handball
- Position: Left wing

Senior clubs
- Years: Team
- –: Vigrestad IK
- –: Bryne IL
- –: Hinna IL
- 1994–2005: Nordstrand IF
- –: Ekeberg HK
National team
Years	Team	Apps	(Gls)
1995–2003	Norway	94	(245)
Medal record
Representing Norway
Women's handball
Olympic Games
Bronze medal – third place	2000 Sydney	Team
World Championship
Silver medal – second place	2001 Italy	Team
European Championship
Silver medal – second place	2002 Denmark	Team

Monica Sandve (born 3 December 1973) is a Norwegian team handball player and Olympic medalist. She received a bronze medal at the 2000 Summer Olympics in Sydney with the Norwegian national team. She played 94 matches and scored 245 goals for the Norwegian national handball team between 1995 and 2003. In addition to the bronze medal at the 2000 Olympics, Sandve represented Norway when the team won a silver medal at the 2001 World Women's Handball Championship in Italy, as well as winning a silver medal at the 2002 European Women's Handball Championship in Denmark.
