= Anette Hovind Johansen =

Norwegian handball player (born 1980)

Personal information
- Nationality: Norwegian
- Born: 24 March 1980 (age 46) Fredrikstad, Norway

Sport
- Sport: Handball
- Position: Left back
- Current club: retired

Youth career
- Years: Team
- –: Kråkerøy IL
- 1997–1998: Skjeberg IF
- 1998–1999: Lisleby FK

Senior clubs
- Years: Team
- 1999–2000: Lisleby FK
- 2000–2004: Nordstrand IF
- 2004–2008: GOG Svendborg TGI
National team
Years	Team	Apps	(Gls)
2000–2008	Norway	99	(231)
Medal record
Representing Norway
Women's handball
World Championship
Silver medal – second place	2007 France	Team competition
European Championship
Gold medal – first place	2006 Sweden	Team competition
Silver medal – second place	2002 Denmark	Team competition

Anette Hovind Johansen (born 24 March 1980) is a Norwegian handball player. She played for Lisleby FK and Nordstrand IF in Norway and for the Danish club GOG Svendborg TGI.

She made her debut on the Norwegian national team in 2000, and played 99 matches and scored 231 goals for the national team between 2000 and 2008. She is European champion from 2006. She received a silver medal at the 2007 World Women's Handball Championship.
