= Kjelsås IL =

Norwegian sports club

Kjelsås Idrettslag is a Norwegian multi-sports club from Nordre Aker, Oslo. The club has sections for association football, team handball, basketball, Nordic skiing, alpine skiing, snowboarding and orienteering.

The club was founded on 16 March 1913. The club colours are blue and white.

Aside from its football section, the club is mainly known for Nordic skiing. Spearheaded by Trude Dybendahl and Marit Mikkelsplass, Kjelsås won the women's relay at the Norwegian Cross-Country Championships on 13 of 15 occasions between 1985 and 1999, every year except for 1987 and 1995. Then, in 2023 the club won the cross-country relay for both women and men. Their best known male skier is Eirik Brandsdal.

Among the handball players to have represented Kjelsås are Astri Bech and Kristian Kjelling.
