= Wenche Wensberg =

Norwegian handball player

Personal information
- Nationality: Norwegian

Sport
- Sport: Handball
National team
Years	Team	Apps	(Gls)
1973–1977	Norway	50	(15)

Wenche Wensberg is a Norwegian handball player. She played 50 matches for the Norway women's national handball team between 1973 and 1977. She participated at the 1973 and 1975 World Women's Handball Championship.
