= Anne Hilmersen =

Norwegian handball player

Personal information
- Nationality: Norwegian

Sport
- Sport: Handball
National team
Years	Team	Apps	(Gls)
1966–1972	Norway	34	(4)

Anne Hilmersen is a Norwegian handball player. She played 34 matches for the Norway women's national handball team between 1966 and 1972. She participated at the 1971 World Women's Handball Championship, where the Norwegian team placed 7th.
