= Randi Elisabeth Dyrdal =

Norwegian handball player

Personal information
- Nationality: Norwegian

Sport
- Sport: Handball
National team
Years	Team	Apps	(Gls)
1974–1977	Norway	35	(13)

Randi Elisabeth Dyrdal is a Norwegian handball player. She played 35 matches for the Norway women's national handball team between 1974 and 1977. She participated in the 1975 World Women's Handball Championship.
