= Monica Vik Hansen =

Norwegian handball player (born 1973)

Personal information
- Nationality: Norwegian
- Born: 3 August 1973 (age 53) Norway

Sport
- Sport: Handball
- Position: Left wing

Senior clubs
- Years: Team
- –: Larvik HK
- –: Tertnes HE
- –: Stabæk Håndball
National team
Years	Team	Apps	(Gls)
1996–1997	Norway	29	(46)
Medal record
World Championship
Silver medal – second place	1997 Germany
European Championship
Silver medal – second place	1996 Denmark

Monica Vik Gabrielsen (née Hansen) is a former Norwegian handball player.

== Biography ==
Hansen played 29 matches for the national handball team in 1996 and 1997. She won a silver medal with the Norwegian team at the 1996 European Women's Handball Championship in Denmark, and participated at the 1997 World Women's Handball Championship in Germany, where the Norwegian team placed second.

At club level she played her entire career in Norway, representing the clubs Larvik Håndballklubb, Tertnes IL and Stabæk Håndball.
