= Ellen Mitchell =

Norwegian handball player (born 1974)

Medal record

Women's handball

World championship
Silver medal – second place	1997 Germany	Team

European championship
Silver medal – second place	1996 Denmark	Team

Ellen Mitchell, née Thomsen (born 1974) is a Norwegian handball player. She played 28 matches for the Norway women's national handball team from 1996 to 1998. She participated at the 1996 European Women's Handball Championship, where the Norwegian team placed second, and at the 1997 World Women's Handball Championship, where Norway also finished second, and once again losing to Denmark in the final.

Her clubs include Åssiden IF and Stabæk.
