= Heidi Tjugum =

Norwegian handball player (born 1973)

Personal information
- Nationality: Norwegian
- Born: 5 September 1973 (age 53) Drammen, Norway
- Height: 178 cm (70 in)

Sport
- Sport: Handball
- Position: Goalkeeper

Youth career
- Years: Team
- –: Åssiden IF
- –: Glassverket IF

Senior clubs
- Years: Team
- 1991–1997: Bækkelagets SK
- 1997–2003: Viborg HK
- 2003–2005: Nordstrand IF
- 2007: HC Leipzig
- 2007–2009: Storhamar IL
National team
Years	Team	Apps	(Gls)
1992–2008	Norway	175	(0)
Medal record
Olympic Games
Silver medal – second place	1992 Barcelona	Team
Bronze medal – third place	2000 Sydney	Team
World Championship
Gold medal – first place	1999 Denmark/Norway	Team
Silver medal – second place	1997 Germany	Team
European Championship
Gold medal – first place	1998 Netherlands	Team
Silver medal – second place	1996 Denmark	Team
Silver medal – second place	2002 Denmark	Team

Heidi Marie Tjugum (born 5 September 1973) is a Norwegian team handball player and goalkeeper, and World Champion from 1999.

== Personal life ==
Tjugum was born in Drammen on 5 September 1973.

== Career ==
=== Club career ===
As a youth player Tjugum representer the clubs Åssiden IF and Glassverket IF. From 1991 to 1997 she played for Bækkelagets SK, and then from 1997 to 2003 for the Danish club Viborg HK. She played for Nordstrand IF from 2003 to 2005, then for the German club HC Leipzig in 2007, and for Storhamar IL from 2007 to 2009.

=== International career ===
Playing for the Norway women's national handball team, she received a silver medal at the 1992 Summer Olympics in Barcelona. She received a bronze medal at the 2000 Summer Olympics in Sydney.

At the 1998 European Championship she won gold medals. This was the first time ever, Norway one said tournament. A year later she won gold medals at the 1999 World Championship.

=== Awards and recognotions ===
Tjugum was awarded the Håndballstatuetten trophy from the Norwegian Handball Federation in 2010.

== Titles ==
Norwegian Champion x 2: 1992 and 2003
EHF Cup x 1: 1999
Danish Champion x 4: 1998, 1999, 2000, 2001
German Cup: 2007
