= Åse Nygård Pedersen =

Norwegian handball player

Åse Nygård
Personal information
- Nationality: Norwegian
- Born: 1955 (age 70–71)

Sport
- Sport: Handball
National team
Years	Team	Apps	(Gls)
1978–1984	Norway	76	(96)

Åse Nygård is a Norwegian handball player. She played 76 matches and scored 96 goals for the Norwegian national team between 1978 and 1984. She participated at the 1982 World Women's Handball Championship, where the Norwegian team placed seventh.
