= Unni Nyhamar Hinkel =

Norwegian handball player

Personal information
- Nationality: Norwegian
- Born: 19 January 1979 (age 47)

Sport
- Sport: Handball
- Position: Goalkeeper

Senior clubs
- Years: Team
- 1995–2007: Nordstrand IF
National team
Years	Team	Apps	(Gls)
2001–2003	Norway	50	(60)
Medal record
World Championship
Silver medal – second place	2001 Italy	Team

Unni Nyhamar Hinkel (born 19 January 1979) is a Norwegian former handball player. She played fifty matches for the Norway women's national handball team between 2001 and 2003. Hinkel was part of the Norwegian team which won a silver medal at the 2001 World Women's Handball Championship in Italy. Norway lost the final 25-30 to Russia. She retired from the Norwegian national team in 2003.

She played her entire career at Nordstrand IF. She retired in 2007 after multiple years with injuries.

She missed the 2001 EHF Cup Winners' Cup final, where Nordstrand lost to Ukrainian Motor Zaporizhzhia.
