= Turid Sannes =

Norwegian handball player

Personal information
- Nationality: Norwegian
- Born: 8 July 1942 (age 84)

Sport
- Sport: Handball
National team
Years	Team	Apps	(Gls)
1975–1977	Norway	54	(122)

Turid Sannes (born 8 July 1942) is a Norwegian handball player. She played 54 matches and scored 122 goals for the Norway women's national handball team between 1975 and 1977. She participated in the 1975 World Women's Handball Championship, where the Norwegian team placed 8th.

She holds the record for the oldest debutant on the Norwegian women's national team at 32 years and 198 days.

Her grand daughter Thea Sannes Sweder is a volleyball player.
