= Isabel Blanco =

Norwegian handball player (born 1979)

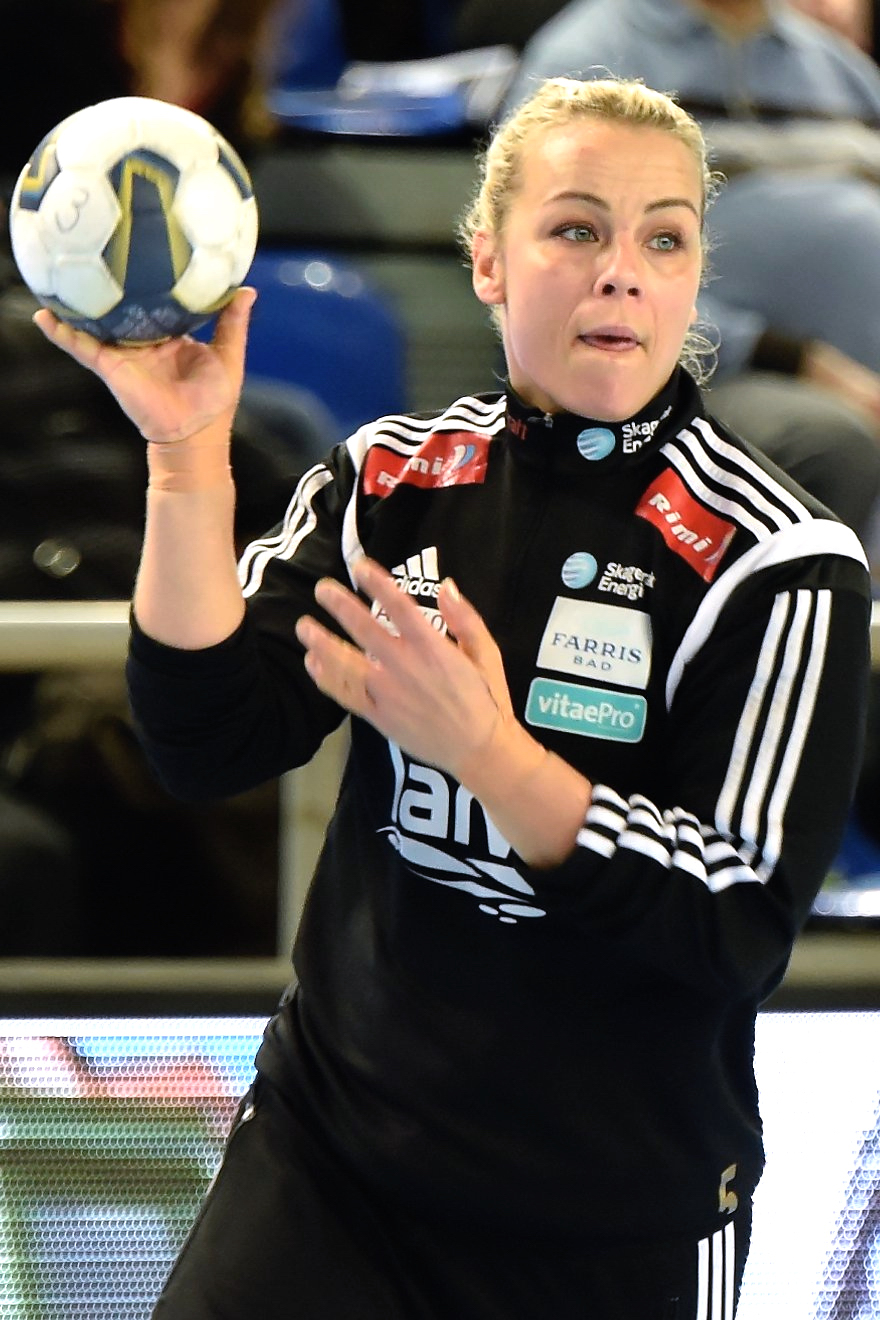

Personal information
- Nationality: Norwegian
- Born: 10 May 1979 (age 47) Bergen, Norway
- Height: 1.75 m (5 ft 9 in)

Sport
- Sport: Handball
- Position: Pivot
- Current club: Halden HK

Youth career
- Years: Team
- –: Vadmyra
- –: Kjøkkelvik
- –: Nordnes

Senior clubs
- Years: Team
- -1998: Tertnes IL
- 1998-1999: Ferrobus Mislata
- 1999-2000: Tertnes IL
- 2000-2004: Ikast-Bording EH
- 2004-2006: Aalborg DH
- 2006-2011: Ikast-Bording EH/FCM
- 2011-2015: Larvik HK
- 2016: Molde HK
- 2016-2017: Halden HK
National team
| Years | Team | Apps | (Gls) |
| 2004–2014 | Norway | 86 | (165) |

Teams managed
- 2016-2017: Halden HK (assistant)
Medal record
European Championship
| Gold medal – first place | 2004 Hungary | Team |
| Gold medal – first place | 2008 Macedonia | Team |
- Updated on 6 June 2016

Isabel Blanco (born 10 May 1979) is a Norwegian former handball player.

== Club career ==
Blanco has previously played for the clubs Kjøkkelvik, Vadmyra, Nordnes, Tertnes HE, Club El Ferrobus Mislata, Aalborg DH, FC Midtjylland, Larvik HK and Molde Elite. She earned a silver medal in the 2005 and 2008 Danish Championships, and a bronze medal in 2006, when she was voted Pivot of the Year in the Danish league.

== National team ==
She won a gold medal at the 2004 European Women's Handball Championship with the Norwegian national team and again at the 2008 European Women's Handball Championship.

== Personal life ==
Blanco was born in Bergen. Her father is Fernando Blanco Jiménez, a former Deportivo de La Coruña football player. She has not lived in Spain except for the one year at Club El Ferrobus Mislata.
