= Inger-Johanne Tveter =

Norwegian handball player

Personal information
- Nationality: Norwegian
- Born: December 30, 1947 (age 78) Skjeberg, Norway

Sport
- Sport: Handball
- Position: Back

Senior clubs
- Years: Team
- 1964–1989: Skjeberg IF
National team
Years	Team	Apps	(Gls)
1966–1974	Norway	67	(41)

Inger-Johanne Tveter (born 30 December 1947) is a Norwegian handball player. She played 67 matches for the Norway women's national handball team between 1966 and 1974. She participated at the 1971 and 1973 World Women's Handball Championship.

She played for Skjeberg IF from 1964 to 1989, where she was the club captain and a key part of the team, that earned the nickname 'Skjeberg-jenterne'.
