= Frode Kyvåg =

Norwegian handball coach and sports administrator

- Born: 8 September 1945 (age 80)
- Occupations: Handball coach and sports official
- Known for: Head coach of the Norway women's national handball team 1974–1978 Secretary-general for Norway Cup from 1975 to 2014
- Spouse: Monica Løken (m. 1995)
- Children: 2

Frode Kyvåg (born 8 September 1945) is a Norwegian team handball coach and sports administrator.

== Career ==
Kyvåg was head coach for the Norway women's national handball team from 1974 to 1978. He coached the women's team of Bækkelagets SK from 1983 to 1988 and from 1991 to 2000, when the team had great success internationally, winning the EHF Women's Cup Winners' Cup in 1998 and 1999. He has been made an honorary member of the club. He has also been a handball coach for the clubs Nordstrand IF, Gjerpen IF and Fjellhammer IL.

He was secretary-general for the international youth football tournament Norway Cup from 1975 to 2014. He is also a former speed skater and competed for Nordstrand IF in the seasons 1958/59–1964/65.

In the 2015 Norwegian local elections he was elected as a member of Oslo city council.

== Personal life ==
Kyvåg was born on 8 September 1945. He married Monica Løken in 1995.
