= Sven-Tore Jacobsen =

Norwegian handball player and coach (born 1954)

Personal information
- Nationality: Norwegian
- Born: 18 August 1953 (age 73)

Sport
- Sport: Handball

Senior clubs
- Years: Team
- 1971–1979: Refstad IL
- 1979–1981: SK Rapp
National team
Years	Team	Apps	(Gls)
1975–1978	Norway	33	(45)

Teams managed
- 1981–1984: Sverresborg IF
- 1984–1993: Norway (women)
- 2012–2014: Kolstad Håndball
- 2015–: Strindheim IL
Medal record
Olympic Games
Silver medal – second place	1988 Seoul	Coach
Silver medal – second place	1992 Barcelona	Coach
World Championship
Bronze medal – third place	1986 Netherlands	Coach
Bronze medal – third place	1993 Norway	Coach

Sven-Tore Jacobsen (born 18 August 1953) is a former Norwegian team handball player, and former head coach for the Norway women's national handball team. In 1994 he was awarded the Olavsstatuetten.

== Career ==
Born on 18 August 1953, Jacobsen played 33 matches for the Norway men's national handball team between 1975 and 1978. At club level he played for Refstad IL and SK Rapp. He won the Norwegian Cup twice, once with Refstad in 1976-77 and once with Rapp in 1979-80.

In 1981 he became the head coach of Sverresborg IF As coach from 1984 to 1993 he led the national team at the World Women's Handball Championship to a Bronze medal in 1986, which was the first time the Norwegian national team won a medal. He later won silver medals at the 1988 and the 1992 Summer Olympics, and a second bronze medal at the 1993 World Championship. The press coverage and popularity of female handball in Norway increased significantly during this period, and is considered the breakthrough period that would lead to Norway becoming one of the strongest national teams in the world.

18 years after retiring as a coach, he made a comeback, when he became the head coach of Kolstad Håndball's men's team. 18 months later he left the position, and became part of the coaching staff. He was replaced by Stian Gomo Nilsen. In 2015 he became the head coach of the 1st Division club Strindheim IL.

He has worked for the Trondheim branch of the agricultural cooperative Felleskjøpet, and as CEO for the wholesaler Maske Gruppen. He has also been the chairperson of the central Norway department of the Norwegian Trotting Association.

== Achievements ==
=== As player ===
- Norwegian Cup: 1978, 1980

=== As Coach ===
Olympic Games

- 1988: 2nd
- 1992: 2nd

World Championships

- 1986: 3rd
- 1990: 6th
- 1993: 3rd

Sporting positions
Preceded by Karen Fladset	Norway women's national handball team head coach 1984 – 1993	Succeeded by Marit Breivik
