= Siri Keul =

Norwegian handball player

Personal information
- Nationality: Norwegian
- Born: 1948 (age 77–78)

Sport
- Sport: Handball
- Position: Goalkeeper
National team
Years	Team	Apps	(Gls)
1970–1976	Norway	54	(0)

Siri Keul is a Norwegian handball goalkeeper. She played 54 matches for the Norway women's national handball team between 1970 and 1976. She participated at the 1971, 1973 and 1975 World Women's Handball Championship.

After her handball career she has worked as a high school teacher.
