= Kristine Moldestad =

Norwegian handball player (born 1969)

Personal information
- Nationality: Norwegian
- Born: 10 April 1969 (age 57) Bærum, Norway
- Height: 169 cm (67 in)

Sport
- Sport: Handball
- Position: Right wing

Senior clubs
- Years: Team
- –: Larvik HK
National team
- Years: Team
- –: Norway

Kristine Moldestad (born 10 April 1969) is a Norwegian handball player who played for the club Larvik HK and the Norwegian national team in the 1990s. She was born in Bærum. She competed at the 1996 Summer Olympics in Atlanta, where the Norwegian team finished fourth.
