= Svanhild Sponberg =

Norwegian handball player

Personal information
- Nationality: Norwegian

Sport
- Sport: Handball
National team
Years	Team	Apps	(Gls)
1965–1973	Norway	28	(4)

Svanhild Sponberg is a Norwegian handball player. She played 28 matches for the Norway women's national handball team between 1965 and 1973. She participated at the 1973 World Women's Handball Championship, where the Norwegian team placed 8th.
