= Astri Knudsen Bech =

Norwegian handball player

Astri Knudsen Bech (née Astri Knudsen, 11 March 1950 in Oslo) is a Norwegian handball player. She played 103 matches for the Norway women's national handball team between 1970 and 1977. She participated at the 1971, 1973 and 1975 World Women's Handball Championship. She played her entire career from 1967 to 1980 for Kjelsås IL.

In 1999 she received the Norwegian handball award Håndballstatuetten.
