= Lunner IL =

Norwegian sports club

- Full name: Lunner Idrettslag

Lunner Idrettslag is a Norwegian sports club from Lunner, Oppland. It currently only has a section for team handball.

The club is best known for its women's handball team. It played in the highest Norwegian league for many years, and became runners-up in the Norwegian Cup in 1989. Kjersti Grini became league top goalscorer and player of the year in 1990, and Cathrine Svendsen became player of the year in 1991. Eli Fallingen also played internationally for Norway. In addition, Jøran Lien Grymyr was a men's international in 1987. The women's team now plays in the Second Division, the third tier.

The men's football team played in the Third Division for some years, last in 2002. After the season the team entered a cooperation with neighbors Grindvoll IL, who played one tier higher. The new cooperation team was named Hadeland Fotball. This team was steadily relegated and went defunct after the 2010 season. A new club Lunner FK was founded on 8 January 2008, and plays in the Fourth Division.

The club was formerly active in athletics. Long-distance runner Leiv Egge has the most national championship medals for the club. He won 5000 metres silver medals in 1953 and 1954 behind Øistein Saksvik, a 10,000 metres bronze medal in 1953 behind Saksvik and Martin Stokken, and a 3 km cross-country silver medal in 1954 behind Ernst Larsen. P. Ottosen also won a 25 km road race silver medal behind John Systad at the national championships in 1947, Magne Aabraaten became national 10,000 metres champion in 1955, and Sverre Øverby became shot put champion in 1953. Their leading athlete was Jorun Askersrud Nygaard, decathlete and Olympic cross-country skier. However, she only represented Lunner IL during her youth.
