= IL Vestar =

Sports club from Oslo, Norway

Idrettslaget Vestar was a Norwegian sports club from Oslo established in 1953, with sections for team handball and athletics.

It was founded as Vestlendingenes IL, indicating its status as a club for people from Western Norway who had moved to Oslo. It took the name IL Vestar in 1960.

It is best known for its women's handball team, which dominated the First Division for much of the 1970s, winning seven titles in a row between 1972 and 1978. This makes it the championship's second most successful club after Larvik HK. Its major international success was reaching the semifinals of the 1977 European Cup, where it was defeated by SC Leipzig. Its best known players were Karen Fladset, Kristin Midthun, Linn Siri Jensen, Ingrid Steen and Cathrine Svendsen.

In athletics, their best known athlete was sprinter Richard Simonsen. One other sprinter won national gold medals; Kåre Magne Åmot in the 100 metres in 1980 and 1981. Handball player Karen Fladset was also a good discus thrower with two Norwegian championships. Leif Rise won national silver and bronze medals in the discus throw and shot put, Astrid Skei won one silver medal in the javelin throw, and John Kristian Johnsen and Oddvin Moland won silver and bronze medals in the triple jump.

== Titles ==
- First Division
  - 1972, 1973, 1974, 1975, 1976, 1977, 1978
- Norwegian Cup
  - 1976, 1977
