= Posten Cup =

Women's handball tournament

The Posten Cup, formerly known as the Møbelringen Cup and Intersport Cup, is an annual women's handball tournament arranged by the Norwegian Handball Federation. Norway plus three invited national teams compete for the title, normally in a single round-robin format.

The tournament is usually held in November, prior to the European or World Championship. It was first arranged in 2001, when the Norwegian Handball Federation reached an agreement with furniture company Møbelringen. From 2019 to 2022 it was known as Intersport Cup, after which it was renamed to Posten Cup since 2023.

== Results ==
Year	Winner	Runner-up	Third	Fourth
2001	Russia	Norway	Sweden	Yugoslavia
2002	Denmark	Norway	France	Sweden
2003	Norway	Hungary	Denmark	Russia
2004	Norway	France	Russia	Croatia
2005	Denmark	Russia	Norway	China
2006	Norway	Russia	France	Germany
2007	Norway	Russia	Denmark	Angola
2008	Norway	Russia	Denmark	Iceland
2009	Norway	Russia	Romania	Croatia
2010	Norway	Serbia	Denmark	Iceland
2011	Norway	Germany	Sweden	Spain
2012	France	Denmark	Norway	Sweden
2013	Norway	Netherlands	South Korea	Russia
2014	Denmark	Norway	France	Serbia
2015	Russia	Norway	Sweden	Netherlands
2016	Norway	Denmark	Russia	France
2017	Norway	Russia	Hungary	South Korea
2018	Norway	France	Denmark	Hungary
2019	Norway	Japan	Brazil	Argentina
2020	Cancelled due to the COVID-19 pandemic			
2021	Norway	Russia	Netherlands	South Korea
2022	Netherlands	Norway	Denmark	Brazil
2023	Norway	Poland	Angola	Iceland
2024	Norway	Denmark	Netherlands	Germany

== See also ==
- GF World Cup
- Carpathian Trophy (women's handball)
- IHF Emerging Nations Championship
