= Intersport Cup 2022 =

Tournament details
- Host country: Norway
- Venue(s): 1 (in 1 host city)
- Dates: 27–30 October
- Teams: 4 (from 2 confederations)

Final positions
- Champions: Netherlands (1st title)
- Runners-up: Norway
- Third place: Denmark
- Fourth place: Brazil

Tournament statistics
- Matches played: 6
- Goals scored: 321 (53.5 per match)
- Top scorer(s): (Brazil) Adriana Cardoso (17 goals)

The Intersport Cup 2022 was a friendly women's handball tournament held between 27 and 30 October 2022, organised by the Norwegian Handball Federation as preparation for the home team for the 2022 European Women's Handball Championship and named Intersport for sponsorship reasons. It was the last edition with this name, after it was renamed Posten Cup for the 2023 edition. Netherlands won the tournament for the first time ever.

== Results ==
Team	Pld	W	D	L	GF	GA	GD	Pts
Netherlands	3	3	0	0	86	75	+11	6
Norway	3	2	0	1	79	82	-3	4
Denmark	3	1	0	2	86	76	+10	2
Brazil	3	0	0	3	70	88	-18	0

== Round robin ==
All times are local (UTC+2).

27 October; 18:10	Netherlands	33-24	Norway	DNB Arena, Stavanger
27 October; 18:10	Malestein 7	(18–13)	Mørk 6	DNB Arena, Stavanger
27 October; 18:10	2× (yellow card) 6× (suspension)	Rapport		DNB Arena, Stavanger

October 27; 20:30	Denmark	34–22	Brazil	DNB Arena, Stavanger; Attendance: 600
October 27; 20:30	Jørgensen 6	(17–10)	Cardoso 9	DNB Arena, Stavanger; Attendance: 600
October 27; 20:30	1× (yellow card) 3× (suspension)	Rapport	1× (suspension)	DNB Arena, Stavanger; Attendance: 600

October 29; 14:00	Netherlands	27–26	Brazil	DNB Arena, Stavanger
October 29; 14:00	Bont, Housheer 5	(14–11)	Cardoso 10	DNB Arena, Stavanger
October 29; 14:00	3× (suspension)	Rapport	4× (suspension)	DNB Arena, Stavanger

October 29; 16:25	Norway	28–27	Denmark	DNB Arena, Stavanger; Attendance: 4,242
October 29; 16:25	Reistad 9	(12–14)	Heindahl, Petersen 6	DNB Arena, Stavanger; Attendance: 4,242
October 29; 16:25	3× (suspension)	Rapport	2× (yellow card) 6× (suspension)	DNB Arena, Stavanger; Attendance: 4,242

October 30; 14:30	Denmark	25–26	Netherlands	DNB Arena, Stavanger
October 30; 14:30	Petersen 4	(13–11)	Malestein 11	DNB Arena, Stavanger
October 30; 14:30	4× (suspension)	Rapport	2× (suspension)	DNB Arena, Stavanger

October 30; 16:45	Brazil	22–27	Norway	DNB Arena, Stavanger
October 30; 16:45	Cardoso 7	(11–11)	Novak 7	DNB Arena, Stavanger
October 30; 16:45	1× (suspension)		2× (suspension)	DNB Arena, Stavanger

== Topscorer ==
#	Name	Team	Goals		
#	Name	Team	Field goals	7 m's	Total
1	Adriana Cardoso	Brazil	12	14	26
2	Angela Malestein	Netherlands	12	6	18
3	Henny Reistad	Norway	13	2	15
4	Kathrine Heindahl	Denmark	13	–	13
4	Merel Freriks	Netherlands	13	–	13
6	Vilde Ingstad	Norway	11	–	11
6	Bruna de Paula	Brazil	11	–	11
8	Kristina Jørgensen	Denmark	10	–	10
8	Laura van der Heijden	Netherlands	10	–	10
8	Simone Petersen	Denmark	7	3	10
