= Møbelringen Cup 2013 =

Norwegian women's handball tournament

Møbelringen Cup 2013 was the 13th edition of the women's handball tournament Møbelringen Cup. It was played in Drammen in Norway from 29 November to 1 December 2013, as a lead up to the 2013 World Championship. France was the defending champion, and Norway won the tournament.

== Results ==
Team	Pts	Pld	W	D	L	PF	PA
Norway	6	3	3	0	0	86	71
Netherlands	3	3	1	1	1	87	88
South Korea	2	3	0	2	1	90	95
Russia	1	3	0	1	2	87	95

29 November 2013

Russia	36–36	South Korea
Norway	28–26	Netherlands

30 November 2013

South Korea	33–33	Netherlands
Norway	32–24	Russia

1 December 2013

Netherlands	28–27	Russia
Norway	26–21	South Korea

== All Star Team ==
Position	Name
Goalkeeper	(Norway) Silje Solberg
Right wing	(South Korea) Woo Sun-hee
Right back	(Norway) Linn Jørum Sulland
Centre back	(Netherlands) Nycke Groot
Left back	(South Korea) Kim Eun-kyeong
Left wing	(Norway) Camilla Herrem
Pivot	(Norway) Heidi Løke
