= Trondheim Spektrum =

Multi-purpose indoor arena in Norway

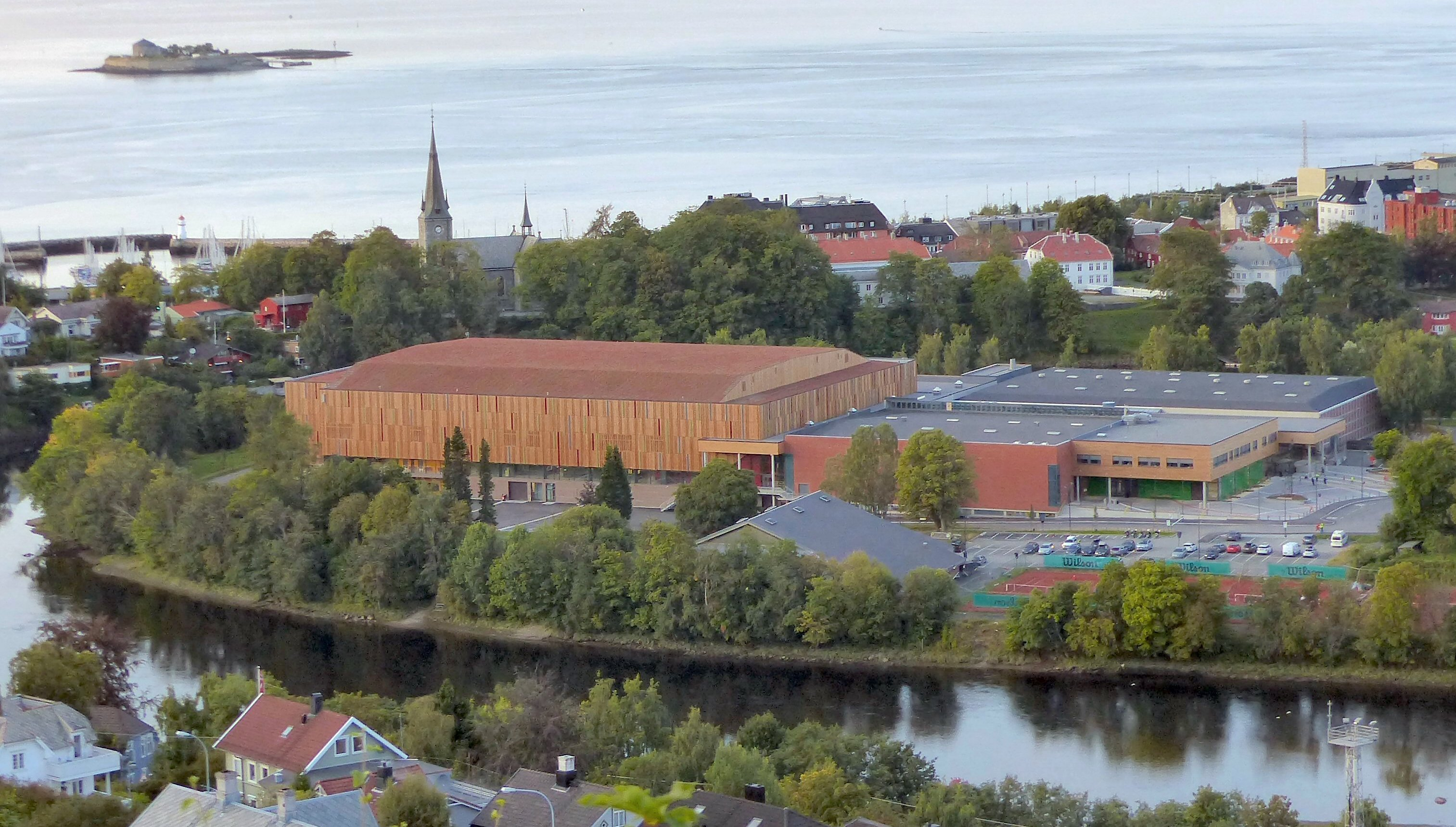
- Trondheim Spektrum in September 2019
- Interactive map of Trondheim Spektrum
- Former names: Nidarøhallen (1961–2002)
- Location: Øya, Trondheim, Norway
- Coordinates: 63°25′38.190″N 10°22′38.107″E
- Owner: Trondheim Spektrum AS
- Capacity: 8,600 seats (handball); 12,000 (concerts)
- Surface: Wood
- Public transit: Trondheim Spektrum, AtB route 12; Skansen, AtB route 9 Skansen Station, Trønderbanen

Construction
- Opened: 1963 (as Nidarøhallen); 4 October 2019
- Renovated: 2017–19
- Expanded: 1971; 1980; 1988; 2000
- Architects: Pran & Torgersen (1963–71); Lien & Risan (1988); Veidekke (renovation)

Tenants
- Nidaros Jets (Basketligaen Norge, 2021–); Kolstad Håndball (EHF Champions League, 2023–2025); Byåsen HE (Eliteserien, 1980's–2020)

Website
- https://trondheimspektrum.no/

Trondheim Spektrum (formerly Nidarøhallen) is a multi-purpose indoor arena in Trondheim, Norway. It is located on the peninsula of Øya next to the Nidelven river. It is the home arena for men's basketball team Nidaros Jets, and was the alternate arena for Kolstad Håndball when playing EHF Champions League matches from 2023 to 2025. A new arena was completed in 2019 and replaced the largest multi-use hall in the same location. The eight former halls originally went by the name Nidarøhallen.

Next to the halls is the athletics facility Øya stadion and the Trondhjems Tennis Club (TTK) with four outdoor clay courts and indoor tennis hall.

== History ==
=== Old building ===
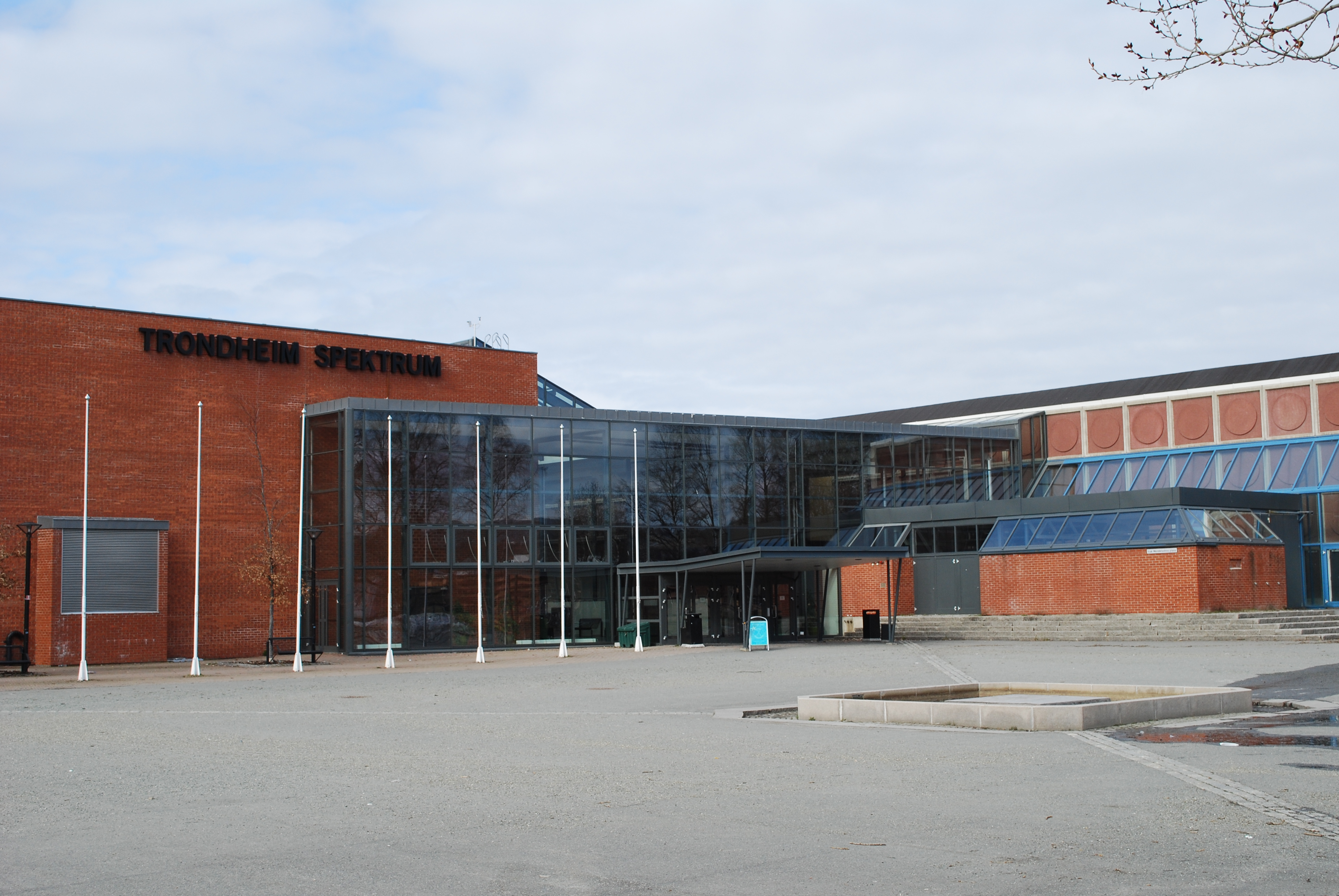
Entrance to the arena in April 2009

The original halls were built in three stages. Halls A and B were designed by architects Pran & Torgersen and were opened in 1963. Further halls was added in 1971 (hall C) and 1980 (hall G), this was followed by stage 3 (halls D and E/H) in 1988 which was designed by Lien & Risan architectural office. The eighth (hall F) was added in 2000. The old Trondheim Spectrum had a floor area of 15,000 m^{2} spread over eight multi-use halls. The main hall had 3,400 seats and space for around 4,500 people standing.

Trondheim Spektrum also had 1,000 square meters of meeting rooms in different sizes from 80 to 480 square meters. The facility had its own press center which consisted of two study rooms, three offices and a meeting room. A tennis club, with four outdoor courts, and a catering company also had premises within the complex.

=== New modern building ===
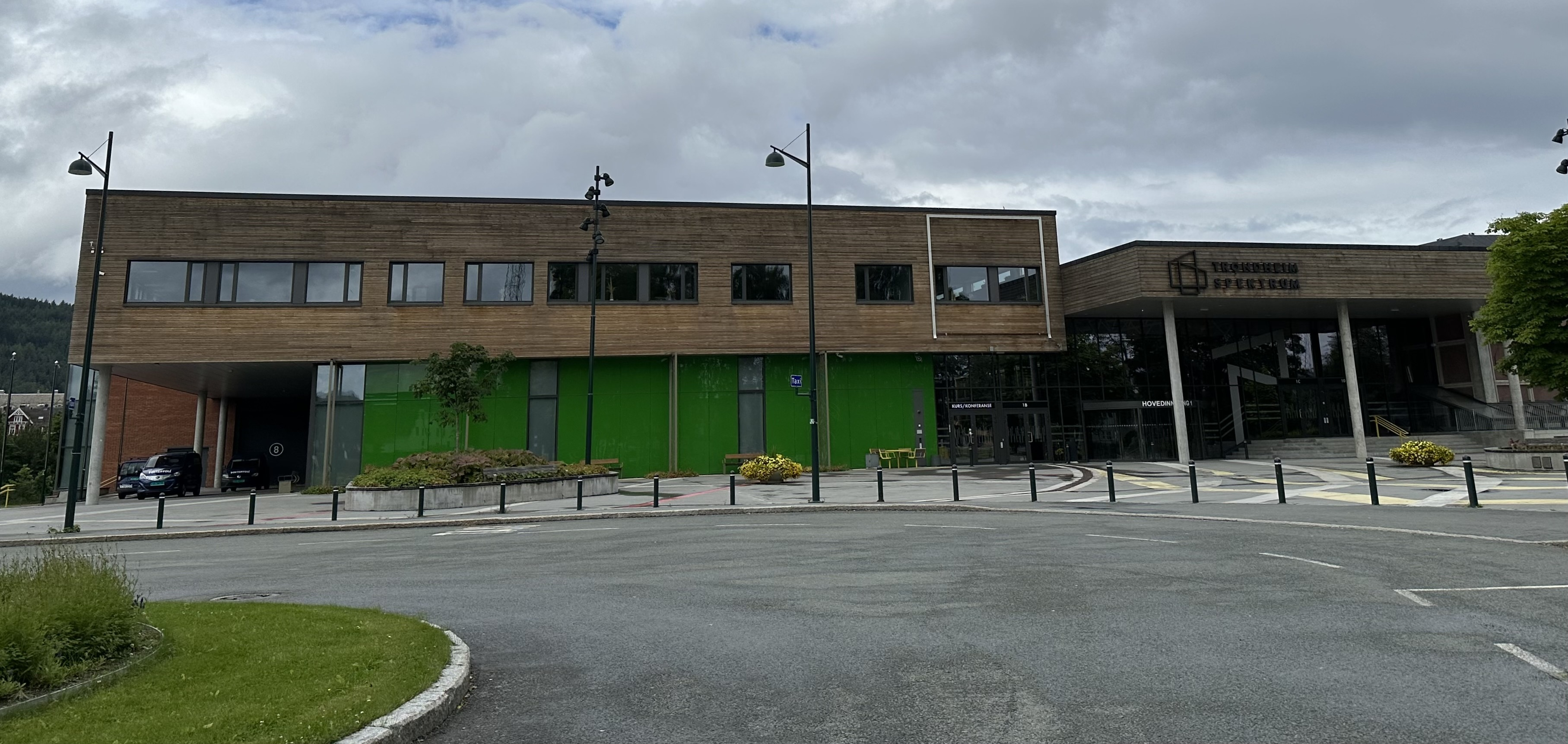
Trondheim Spektrum in July 2023

From summer 2017, Trondheim Spektrum underwent a significant renovation and extension. In June 2017, Veidekke Entreprenør won the contract valued at NOK 317 million (excluding VAT) to build the new multi-purpose hall. Construction work started in September 2017 and was completed in the autumn of 2019. The new venue has nine full-size handball courts and six children's mini courts. The main hall has 8,600 seats and concerts can be arranged with up to 12,000 spectators.

In June 2019, Eventim Norway was announced as the official ticketing partner. The venue opened on 4 October 2019 with a performance by John Mayer during the European leg of his 2019 concert tour, I Guess I Just Feel Like World Tour.

== Events ==
Besides sports and concerts, the halls are regularly used for courses, seminars, congresses, stand-up comedy and trade fairs; for example, the fish farming fair Aqua Nor and the fishing fair Nor-Fishing. It also hosts a wide variety of other events, only some of which are listed on Spektrum's own websites.

=== Sport ===
Trondheim Spektrum was one of the arenas where matches were played in the preliminary rounds of the European Handball Championship in 2020 for men, and was planned to do the same for women. Previously, matches during the IHF World Women's Handball Championship have also been held here in both 1993 and 1999, and during the 2008 European Men's Handball Championship. It was a proposed venue for the 2025 World Men's Handball Championship, however in January 2024 negotiations with the city fell through due to financial reasons.

Other sporting events to be held here include the Møbelringen Cup (in 2005 and 2009) and the 2016 Northern European Gymnastics Championships.

On 22 October 2022, Trondheim Spektrum was the arena for the elite series match between Kolstad and Elverum, which had an audience record of 9,083 spectators where Kolstad won 26-24 over arch-rival Elverum.

=== Music and concerts ===
On 15 February 2020, the final of Melodi Grand Prix 2020 took place. This was the first time that Trondheim hosted a Melodi Grand Prix final, and marked the first time since Melodi Grand Prix 1989 that the final was not arranged in Oslo. The venue then hosted the final of Melodi Grand Prix 2023 and Melodi Grand Prix 2024.

== Venues ==
The Trondheim Spektrum building is a multi-hall facility, of which five are suited for sports.

=== Hall A ===
The one used for big events, including handball championship matches (including the 2020 European Men's Handball Championship and the 2023 World Women's Handball Championship), Melodi Grand Prix, concerts, and the 2025 Idrettsgallaen. Kolstad Håndball used it for matches in the EHF Champions League from 2023 through 2025, before getting dispensation to host such matches in their regular arena (Kolstad Arena) for economic reasons, but have continued to host many of their domestic home matches against Elverum Håndball in Spektrum.

Occasionally, the hall has also been used for less high-profile events where expectations for spectators have been much lower, including, but not limited to, the above-mentioned trade fairs, the Norwegian International Taekwon-Do Federation championships, late 2022 upper secondary school exams, the 2024 Dodgeball Northern European Championship, and motor shows.

The stand configurations available include two-tier U-shaped main stands, and a single-tier stand on one of the short ends that can be extended for big matches, and retracted for concerts and ice rink events. Less commonly, the lower tier of the main stands can also be retracted when hosting trade expos.

The ice rink configuration is virtually never used, though it did host Disney on Ice in February 2024, and was the focus of Norway's bid for the 2027 IIHF World Championship before the bid was withdrawn.

The hall is scheduled to host the 2026 Davis Cup World Group I match between Norway and China on 18–19 September 2026. A clay court was configured for the occasion.

=== Hall D ===
Was initially the primary home of Byåsen HE before they moved to Kolstad Arena in 2020. The hall has seating for 3,000. All four stands can be retracted for the use of various amateur and youth clubs.

The hall was also used for the 2023 World Cheese Awards. It is used as the FanZone during handball championships.

The hall was used for the men's 2021 Gjensidige Cup handball 4-nations tournament, as Hall A had already been booked for the ITF Taekwon-Do Norwegian championships well in advance.

As of December 2023, it is the only hall in Spektrum where futsal at amateur and youth level is permitted.

Hall D hosted the women's roller derby match betweeb Nidaros Roller Derby and Sundsvall Demolition Rollers in 2024.

=== Hall F ===
Has one sole grandstand with seating for 1,033, and is used by Nidaros Jets in the men's Basketligaen Norge. The stand can be retracted for the use of various amateur and youth clubs.

=== Hall G ===
Dedicated to tennis, with two indoor hardcourts. Seating is almost non-existent in its default configuration. It is associated with the four nearby outdoor clay courts.

=== Hall E ===
Used primarily by youth clubs. As the hall is located in the basement, has a low roof, and has various support poles, it is unsuited to host full-size fields for virtually any sport. It did however host the card collector meeting Collect63 in September 2026.

== Transport ==
=== Bus ===
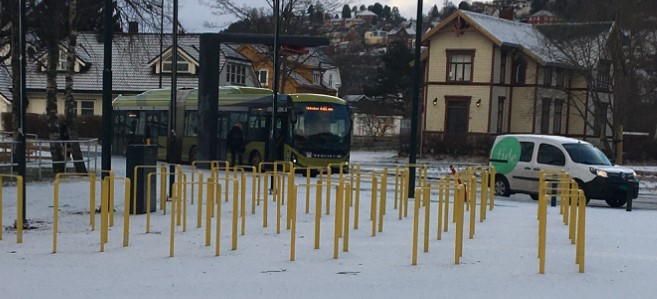
A Bus from AtB at the Bus Charging Station Nidarø, beside the main building.

To get to the Arena, AtB Line 12 trafficates the bus stop Nidarø right beside one of the entrances. Other approaches may include taking Metrobus Line 3 or regular lines 11, 21, 28, 26 or 75 to Skansen a bit north of the facility, and walking over the north-south bridge connecting the two parts.

From the southern and eastern suburbs, AtB line 1 and 2, as well as VærnesEkspressen southbound (but not northbound), allow transit to Line 12 at Studentersamfundet or Nidaros Cathedral, or simply walking to Spektrum from Studentersamfundet.

For northbound long-distance regional buses with blue exteriors, the closest stop is Olav Kyrres Gate. The closest southbound with the same bus type is Dronningens gate.

The Møre og Romsdal regional bus company Fram operate their own lines 902 and 905 (both of them known as Mørelinjen) from either Molde, Ålesund, or Sunndalsøra, whose closest stop is St. Olavs Hospital.

Vy route VY710 from Lillehammer has its closest stop at Olav Kyrres gate

The Innlandet regional bus company Innlandstrafikk route 135 from Alvdal Municipality or Tynset Municipality has its closest stop at St. Olavs Hospital.

=== Airport ===
Trondheim Airport in Stjørdal Municipality is 37 kilometres (23 mi) away. A much less common option is Ørland Airport 105km away.

=== Train ===
Trondheim Central Station is 1.7km away. For regional trains (Trønderbanen), Skansen Station is approximately 550m away.

The closest tram station (Gråkallbanen) is also at Skansen, approximately 500 metres (1,600 ft) away.

=== Boats ===
Express boats from Vanvikan, Brekstad, and further southwest from Kristiansund, arrive 1.9 kilometres (1.2 mi) away. The Norwegian Coastal Express arrive approximately 2.9km away.

=== Other ===
A west-east bridge allow pedestrian (and to some degree bicycle) access from downtown Trondheim (an area commonly known as Midtbyen), Leüthenhaven, and Kalvskinnet.

== See also ==
- List of indoor arenas in Norway
- List of indoor arenas in Nordic countries
