= Møbelringen Cup 2017 =

2017 Møbelringen Cup
Tournament details
- Host country: Norway
- Venue: 1 (in 1 host city)
- Dates: 23–26 November
- Teams: 4 (from 2 confederations)

Final positions
- Champions: Norway (12th title)
- Runners-up: Russia
- Third place: Hungary
- Fourth place: South Korea

Tournament statistics
- Matches played: 6
- Goals scored: 370 (61.67 per match)
- Attendance: 13,740 (2,290 per match)
- Top scorer(s): Gwon Han-na (KOR); Daria Dmitrieva (RUS) (20)

Møbelringen Cup 2017 was the 17th edition of the handball tournament Møbelringen Cup. It held in Fjell Municipality in Norway, just west of the city of Bergen. The tournament started on 23 November and finished on 26 November 2017 in the lead up to the 2017 World Women's Handball Championship in Germany.

== Results ==
Team	Pts	Pld	W	D	L	PF	PA
Norway	5	3	2	1	0	95	79
Russia	5	3	2	1	0	96	90
Hungary	2	3	1	0	2	85	91
South Korea	0	3	0	0	3	85	101

All times are Central European Time (UTC+1)

November 23, 2017; 18:15	Norway	39–28	South Korea	Sotra Arena, Fjell Municipality outside Bergen; Attendance: 3650; Referees: Samir Krichen, Samir Mahklouf (Tunisia)
November 23, 2017; 18:15	Løke, Kurtović 7	(22–12)	Ha Rang 8	Sotra Arena, Fjell Municipality outside Bergen; Attendance: 3650; Referees: Samir Krichen, Samir Mahklouf (Tunisia)
November 23, 2017; 18:15	2× (yellow card) 3× (suspension)	Report	0× (yellow card) 3× (suspension)	Sotra Arena, Fjell Municipality outside Bergen; Attendance: 3650; Referees: Samir Krichen, Samir Mahklouf (Tunisia)

November 23, 2017; 20:30	Russia	35–33	Hungary	Sotra Arena, Fjell Municipality outside Bergen; Attendance: 420; Referees: Mads Fremstad, Markus Pedersen (Norway)
November 23, 2017; 20:30	Dmitrieva 8	(18–17)	Kovacsics 8	Sotra Arena, Fjell Municipality outside Bergen; Attendance: 420; Referees: Mads Fremstad, Markus Pedersen (Norway)
November 23, 2017; 20:30	2× (yellow card) 4× (suspension)	Report	2× (yellow card) 3× (suspension)	Sotra Arena, Fjell Municipality outside Bergen; Attendance: 420; Referees: Mads Fremstad, Markus Pedersen (Norway)

November 25, 2017; 16:00	South Korea	30–34	Russia	Sotra Arena, Fjell Municipality outside Bergen; Referees: Kjersti Arntsen, Guro Røen (Norway)
November 25, 2017; 16:00	Gwon 8	(14–16)	Dmitrieva 6	Sotra Arena, Fjell Municipality outside Bergen; Referees: Kjersti Arntsen, Guro Røen (Norway)
November 25, 2017; 16:00	2× (yellow card) 3× (suspension)	Report	3× (yellow card) 3× (suspension)	Sotra Arena, Fjell Municipality outside Bergen; Referees: Kjersti Arntsen, Guro Røen (Norway)

November 25, 2017; 18:15	Norway	29–24	Hungary	Sotra Arena, Fjell Municipality outside Bergen; Attendance: 3700; Referees: Samir Krichen, Samir Mahklouf (Tunisia)
November 25, 2017; 18:15	Løke 7	(11–12)	Kovács 5	Sotra Arena, Fjell Municipality outside Bergen; Attendance: 3700; Referees: Samir Krichen, Samir Mahklouf (Tunisia)
November 25, 2017; 18:15	2× (yellow card) 4× (suspension)	Report	3× (yellow card) 6× (suspension)	Sotra Arena, Fjell Municipality outside Bergen; Attendance: 3700; Referees: Samir Krichen, Samir Mahklouf (Tunisia)

November 26, 2017; 16:00	Hungary	28–27	South Korea	Sotra Arena, Fjell Municipality outside Bergen; Attendance: 2000; Referees: Kjersti Arntsen, Guro Røen (Norway)
November 26, 2017; 16:00	Anita Görbicz 9	(13–12)	Ryu Eun-hee 7	Sotra Arena, Fjell Municipality outside Bergen; Attendance: 2000; Referees: Kjersti Arntsen, Guro Røen (Norway)
November 26, 2017; 16:00	2× (yellow card) 2× (suspension)	Report	3× (yellow card) 2× (suspension)	Sotra Arena, Fjell Municipality outside Bergen; Attendance: 2000; Referees: Kjersti Arntsen, Guro Røen (Norway)

November 26, 2017
18:15
Norway
32–31
Russia
Sotra Arena, Fjell Municipality outside Bergen
Attendance: 3970
Referees: Samir Krichen, Samir Mahklouf (Tunisia)
Løke, Skogrand, Mørk 4
(13–12)
Dmitrieva 6
2× (yellow card) 2× (suspension)
Report
3× (yellow card) 2× (suspension)

FT: 27–27 Pen: 5–4

== All-Star Team ==
The All-Star Team was announced on 26 November 2017.

- Goalkeeper: Katrine Lunde (NOR)
- Right wing: Iuliia Managarova (RUS)
- Right back: Nora Mørk (NOR)
- Centre back: Stine Bredal Oftedal (NOR)
- Left back: Daria Dmitrieva (RUS)
- Left wing: Nadine Schatzl (HUN)
- Pivot: Heidi Løke (NOR)
