= Møbelringen Cup 2012 =

Norwegian women's handball tournament

Møbelringen Cup 2012 was the 12th edition of the women's handball tournament Møbelringen Cup. It was played in Bergen in Norway from 23 to 25 November 2012 as preparation for the 2012 European Women's Handball Championship. Norway was the defending champion, and France won the tournament.

== Results ==
Team	Pts	Pld	W	D	L	PF	PA
France	6	3	3	0	0	82	77
Denmark	4	3	2	0	1	95	87
Norway	2	3	1	0	2	79	92
Sweden	0	3	0	0	3	75	85

23 November 2012

France	24–22	Sweden
Norway	27–31	Denmark

24 November 2012

Denmark	33–35	France
Norway	30–28	Sweden

25 November 2012

Sweden	25–31	Denmark
Norway	22–23	France

== All Star Team ==
Position	Name
Goalkeeper	(Denmark) Sandra Toft
Right wing	(Norway) Linn-Kristin Riegelhuth Koren
Right back	(Denmark) Line Jørgensen
Centre back	(Sweden) Isabelle Gulldén
Left back	(Denmark) Kristina Kristiansen
Left wing	(France) Paule Baudouin
Pivot	(Norway) Heidi Løke
