= Møbelringen Cup 2016 =

Norwegian women's handball tournament

Møbelringen Cup 2016 was the 16th edition of the women's handball tournament Møbelringen Cup. It was played in Stavanger in Norway from 24 to 27 November 2016, as preparation for the 2016 European Championship. Russia was the defending champion, and Norway won the tournament.

== Results ==
Team	Pts	Pld	W	D	L	PF	PA
Norway	6	3	3	0	0	88	71
Denmark	2	3	1	0	2	74	73
Russia	2	3	1	0	2	78	81
France	2	3	1	0	2	63	78

24 November 2016

France	23–30	Russia
Norway	31–25	Denmark

26 November 2016

Russia	22–30	Denmark
Norway	29–20	France

27 November 2016

Denmark	19–20	France
Norway	28–26	Russia

== All Star Team ==
Position	Name
Goalkeeper	(Norway) Kari Aalvik Grimsbø
Right wing	(Russia) Anna Vyakhireva
Right back	(Denmark) Mette Tranborg
Centre back	(Russia) Daria Dmitrieva
Left back	(Norway) Veronica Kristiansen
Left wing	(Norway) Camilla Herrem
Pivot	(Norway) Marit Malm Frafjord
