= Møbelringen Cup 2015 =

Norwegian women's handball tournament

Møbelringen Cup 2015 was the 15th edition of the women's handball tournament Møbelringen Cup. It was played in Gjøvik and Lillehammer in Norway from 26 to 29 November 2015. Denmark was the defending champion, and Russia won the tournament, which were decided on penalty throws.

== Results ==
Team	Pts	Pld	W	D	L	PF	PA
Russia	5	3	2	1	0	85	76
Norway	5	3	2	1	0	85	81
Sweden	2	3	1	0	2	82	87
Netherlands	0	3	0	0	3	56	84

26 November 2015

Sweden	31–27	Netherlands
Norway	26–26 (3–4 on penalties)	Russia

28 November 2015

Russia	32–24	Sweden
Norway	31–28	Netherlands

29 November 2015

Netherlands	26–27	Russia
Norway	28–27	Sweden

== All Star Team ==
The all star team was decided by a jury consisting of Arne Hole from Aftenposten and Harald Bredeli and Bent Svele for TV 2 (Norway).

Position	Name
Goalkeeper	(Russia) Anna Sedoykina
Right wing	(Russia) Anna Vyakhireva
Right back	(Norway) Nora Mørk
Centre back	(Norway) Stine Bredal Oftedal
Left back	(Russia) Ekaterina Ilina
Left wing	(Sweden) Louise Sand
Pivot	(Norway) Heidi Løke
