= Møbelringen Cup 2018 =

Norwegian women's handball tournament

Møbelringen Cup 2018 was the 18th edition of the women's handball tournament Møbelringen Cup. It was played in Fornebu, near Oslo in Norway from 22 to 25 November 2018. It was the last edition, where the tournament was called Møbelringen Cup 2018. In 2019 it changed name to Intersport Cup 2019. Norway was the defending champion, and won the tournament for the third time in a row and 12th time in total.

== Results ==
Team	Pts	Pld	W	D	L	PF	PA
Norway	6	3	3	0	0	76	62
France	4	3	2	0	1	62	61
Denmark	2	3	1	0	2	65	66
Hungary	0	3	0	0	3	53	67

22 November 2018

Norway	25–19	Hungary
France	22–20	Denmark

24 November 2018

Hungary	18–19	France
Norway	28–22	Denmark

25 November 2018

Denmark	23–16	Hungary
Norway	23–21	France

== All Star Team ==
Norway's goalkeeper Silje Solberg was named the tournament MVP.

Position	Name
Goalkeeper	(France) Amandine Leynaud
Right wing	(Norway) Malin Aune
Right back	(Norway) Linn Jørum Sulland
Centre back	(Hungary) Szimonetta Planéta
Left back	(France) Estelle Nze Minko
Left wing	(France) Siraba Dembélé Pavlović
Pivot	(Norway) Heidi Løke
