= Møbelringen Cup 2011 =

Norwegian women's handball tournament

Møbelringen Cup 2011 was the 11th edition of the women's handball tournament Møbelringen Cup. It was played in Stavanger in Norway from 18 to 20 November 2011 as preparation for the 2011 World Women's Handball Championship. Norway was the defending champion, and won the tournament for the sixth time in a row.

== Results ==
Team	Pts	Pld	W	D	L	PF	PA
Norway	5	3	2	1	0	85	68
Germany	4	3	2	0	1	75	71
Sweden	2	3	1	0	2	67	77
Spain	1	3	0	1	2	67	78

18 November 2011; 16:15	Sweden	27-19	Spain	Stavanger Idrettshall, Stavanger; Attendance: 1980; Referees: Arntsen & Gullaksen (NOR)
18 November 2011; 16:15	Islas Helgesson 8	(15-9)	Martín 7	Stavanger Idrettshall, Stavanger; Attendance: 1980; Referees: Arntsen & Gullaksen (NOR)
18 November 2011; 16:15	1× (yellow card) 2× (suspension)	Report	3× (yellow card) 1× (suspension)	Stavanger Idrettshall, Stavanger; Attendance: 1980; Referees: Arntsen & Gullaksen (NOR)

18 November 2011; 18:15	Norway	27-24	Germany	Stavanger Idrettshall, Stavanger
18 November 2011; 18:15	Jørum Sulland 10	(14-9)	Mietzner & Nadgornaja 6	Stavanger Idrettshall, Stavanger
18 November 2011; 18:15	?× (yellow card) 4× (suspension) 1× (red card)	Report	?× (yellow card) 2× (suspension)	Stavanger Idrettshall, Stavanger

19 November 2011; 14:45	Germany	26-22	Sweden	SYSCO arena, Førresfjorden
19 November 2011; 14:45	Krause 7	(11-8)	Ahlm 6	SYSCO arena, Førresfjorden
19 November 2011; 14:45	?× (yellow card)	Report	?× (yellow card) 1× (suspension)	SYSCO arena, Førresfjorden

19 November 2011; 16:45	Norway	26-26	Spain	Tysvær Arena, Haugesund; Referees: Coulibaly & Diabate (CIV)
19 November 2011; 16:45	3 players 4	(14-12)	Alonso Bernardo & Pena 5	Tysvær Arena, Haugesund; Referees: Coulibaly & Diabate (CIV)
19 November 2011; 16:45	3× (yellow card) 4× (suspension)	Report	1× (yellow card) 1× (suspension)	Tysvær Arena, Haugesund; Referees: Coulibaly & Diabate (CIV)

20 November 2011; 13:15	Germany	25-22	Spain	Stavanger Idrettshall, Stavanger; Referees: Augestad & Arntsen (NOR)
20 November 2011; 13:15	Richter 7	(9-8)	Mangué 4	Stavanger Idrettshall, Stavanger; Referees: Augestad & Arntsen (NOR)
20 November 2011; 13:15	3× (yellow card) 2× (suspension)	Report	2× (yellow card) 2× (suspension)	Stavanger Idrettshall, Stavanger; Referees: Augestad & Arntsen (NOR)

2 November 2011; 15:15	Norway	32-18	Sweden	Stavanger Idrettshall, Stavanger
2 November 2011; 15:15	Løke 6	(14-9)	Roberts 5	Stavanger Idrettshall, Stavanger
2 November 2011; 15:15	?× (yellow card) 2× (suspension)	Report	?× (yellow card) 1× (suspension)	Stavanger Idrettshall, Stavanger
