= Møbelringen Cup 2003 =

Norwegian Women's Handball Tournament

The Møbelringen Cup 2003 was the third edition of the Handball tournament Møbelringen Cup. The tournament started on 7 November 2003 and finished on 9 November as a lead up to the 2003 World Women's Handball Championship. It was contested by the hosts, Norway as well as Russia, Denmark and Hungary. Norway won the event ahead of Hungary.

== Results ==
Team	Pts	Pld	W	D	L	PF	PA	GD
Norway	4	3	1	2	0	79	71	+8
Hungary	3	3	1	1	1	85	83	+2
Denmark	3	3	1	1	1	67	69	-2
Russia	2	3	1	0	2	78	86	-8

Date	Team 1	Team 2	Result
7.11	Denmark	Russia	22-21
7.11	Norway	Hungary	26-26
8.11	Denmark	Hungary	26-29
8.11	Norway	Russia	34-26
9.11	Hungary	Russia	30-31
9.11	Norway	Denmark	19-19
Source (in Norwegian)
