= Intersport Cup 2021 =

Tournament details
- Host country: Norway
- Venue(s): 1 (in 1 host city)
- Dates: 25–28 November
- Teams: 4 (from 2 confederations)

Final positions
- Champions: Norway (2nd title)
- Runner-up: Russia
- Third place: Netherlands
- Fourth place: South Korea

Tournament statistics
- Matches played: 6
- Goals scored: 357 (59.5 per match)
- Top scorer(s): (Netherlands) Dione Housheer (17 goals)

The Intersport Cup 2021 is a friendly women's handball tournament held between 25 and 28 November 2021, organised by the Norwegian Handball Federation as preparation for the home team for the 2021 World Women's Handball Championship and named Intersport for sponsorship reasons.

== Results ==
Team	Pld	W	D	L	GF	GA	GD	Pts
Norway	3	2	0	1	99	73	+26	4
Russia	3	2	0	1	92	84	+8	4
Netherlands	3	2	0	1	94	90	+4	4
South Korea	3	0	0	3	71	110	-39	0

== Round robin ==
All times are local (UTC+2).

November 25; 18:15	Norway	36-21	Netherlands	Åsane Arena, Åsane
November 25; 18:15	Solberg 7	(19-11)	Housheer , Snelder, Vollebregt, van Wetering 4	Åsane Arena, Åsane
November 25; 18:15	1× (yellow card) 4× (suspension)	Report	2× (yellow card) 5× (suspension)	Åsane Arena, Åsane

November 25; 20:30	Russia	34-24	South Korea	Åsane Arena, Åsane
November 25; 20:30	Tazhenova 6	(23-12)	Song 4	Åsane Arena, Åsane
November 25; 20:30	1× (yellow card) 6× (suspension)	Report	1× (yellow card) 3× (suspension)	Åsane Arena, Åsane

November 27; 14:30	Netherlands	32-29	Russia	Åsane Arena, Åsane
November 27; 14:30	Snelder 5	(16-11)	Skorobogatchenko 4	Åsane Arena, Åsane
November 27; 14:30	1× (yellow card) 7× (suspension)	Report	1× (yellow card) 8× (suspension)	Åsane Arena, Åsane

November 27; 16:45	Norway	35-23	South Korea	Åsane Arena, Åsane
November 27; 16:45	Herrem 7	(11-13)	Ryu 5	Åsane Arena, Åsane
November 27; 16:45	0× (yellow card) 3× (suspension)	Report	0× (yellow card) 2× (suspension)	Åsane Arena, Åsane

November 28; 14:30	South Korea	25-41	Netherlands	Åsane Arena, Åsane
November 28; 14:30	Kim 5	(12-20)	Dulfer, Housheer, Snelder, Vollebregt 4	Åsane Arena, Åsane
November 28; 14:30	1× (yellow card) 2× (suspension)	Report	2× (yellow card) 3× (suspension)	Åsane Arena, Åsane

November 28; 16:45	Norway	28-29	Russia	Åsane Arena, Åsane
November 28; 16:45	Herrem 5	(12-15)	Mikhaylichenko	Åsane Arena, Åsane
November 28; 16:45	1× (yellow card) 2× (suspension)	Report	1× (yellow card) 5× (suspension)	Åsane Arena, Åsane
