= Møbelringen Cup 2008 =

Women's handball competition

Møbelringen Cup 2008 was the 8th edition of the handball tournament Møbelringen Cup. It was held in Norway, in the cities of Oslo, Gjøvik and Lillestrøm. The tournament started on 21 November and finished on 23 November 2008. Norway won the event by winning all their matches.

== Results ==
Team	Pts	Pld	W	D	L	PF	PA
Norway	6	3	3	0	0	101	63
Russia	3	3	1	1	1	83	80
Denmark	3	3	1	1	1	75	81
Iceland	0	3	0	0	3	57	92

All times are Central European Time (UTC+1)

November 21, 2008; 17:00	Denmark	27 – 27	Russia	Oppsal Arena, Oslo; Attendance: 2,300; Referees: Andersen, Sødal (NOR)
November 21, 2008; 17:00	Skov 6	(Report)	Poltoratskaya 7	Oppsal Arena, Oslo; Attendance: 2,300; Referees: Andersen, Sødal (NOR)

November 21, 2008; 19:15	Norway	36 – 15	Iceland	Oppsal Arena, Oslo; Attendance: 3,017; Referees: Lindroos, Leandersson (FIN)
November 21, 2008; 19:15	Frafjord, Riegelhuth 7	(Report)	Bjørnsdottir 3	Oppsal Arena, Oslo; Attendance: 3,017; Referees: Lindroos, Leandersson (FIN)

November 22, 2008; 14:00	Russia	33 – 20	Iceland	Gjøvik Olympiske Fjellhall, Gjøvik; Attendance: 3,862; Referees: Andersen, Sødal (NOR)
November 22, 2008; 14:00	Vetkova 5	(Report)	Stefansdottir 5	Gjøvik Olympiske Fjellhall, Gjøvik; Attendance: 3,862; Referees: Andersen, Sødal (NOR)

November 22, 2008; 16:15	Norway	32 – 25	Denmark	Gjøvik Olympiske Fjellhall, Gjøvik; Attendance: 5,250; Referees: Lindroos, Leandersson (FIN)
November 22, 2008; 16:15	Larsen 6	(Report)	Grigel 6	Gjøvik Olympiske Fjellhall, Gjøvik; Attendance: 5,250; Referees: Lindroos, Leandersson (FIN)

November 23, 2008; 17:00	Iceland	22 – 23	Denmark	Skedsmohallen, Lillestrøm; Attendance: 4,013; Referees: Andersen, Sødal (NOR)
November 23, 2008; 17:00	Stefansdottir 5	(Report)	Mikkelsen 7	Skedsmohallen, Lillestrøm; Attendance: 4,013; Referees: Andersen, Sødal (NOR)

November 23, 2008; 19:15	Norway	33 – 23	Russia	Skedsmohallen, Lillestrøm; Attendance: 4,007; Referees: Lindroos, Leandersson (FIN)
November 23, 2008; 19:15	Riegelhuth 8	(Report)	Poltoratskaya 5	Skedsmohallen, Lillestrøm; Attendance: 4,007; Referees: Lindroos, Leandersson (FIN)

== All-Star Team ==
- Goalkeeper: Katrine Lunde Haraldsen (NOR)
- Left Wing: Kari Mette Johansen (NOR)
- Back Player: Tonje Larsen (NOR)
- Back Player: Rikke Skov (DEN)
- Back Player: Irina Poltoratskaya (RUS)
- Right Wing: Linn-Kristin Riegelhuth (NOR)
- Line Player: Marit Malm Frafjord (NOR)
