= Møbelringen Cup 2006 =

Women's handball tournament in Norway

Official logo

The 2006 Møbelringen Cup was the 6th edition of the handball tournament Møbelringen Cup. It was held in Hamar, Gjøvik and Lillehammer, Norway. The tournament started on 24 November 2006 and finished on 26 November. Norway won the event by winning all their matches. Russia who also won their first two matches, was beaten in the last match of the tournament, when Norway won by 29-26.

After Norway won the tournament, Norway's coach Marit Breivik had to decline suggestions that Norway were favourites for the European Championships in December. Regardless, Norwegian newspaper Aftenposten said that Russia were no longer the major favourites for the EC.

== Results ==
Team	Pts	Pld	W	D	L	PF	PA
Norway	6	3	3	0	0	94	72
Russia	4	3	2	0	1	82	74
France	2	3	1	0	2	64	76
Germany	0	3	0	0	3	68	86

24 November 2006, Hamar

Germany	23–28	Russia
Norway	31–18	France

25 November 2006, Gjøvik

France	22–28	Russia
Norway	34–28	Germany

26 November 2006, Lillehammer

France	24–17	Germany
Norway	29–26	Russia

== All-Star Team ==
- Goalkeeper: Kari Aalvik Grimsbø (NOR)
- Left Wing: Emilia Turey (RUS)
- Back Player: Linn-Kristin Riegelhuth (NOR)
- Back Player: Gro Hammerseng (NOR)
- Back Player: Anna Kareyeva (RUS)
- Right Wing: Stéphanie Cano (FRA)
- Line Player: Else-Marthe Sørlie Lybekk (NOR)
