= Ole Eliasen =

Danish handball player

Personal information
- Nationality: Danish
- Born: 21 June 1952 (age 74) Aarhus, Denmark

Sport
- Sport: Handball

Youth career
- Years: Team
- –: Aarhus Fremad
- –: AGF Håndbold

Senior clubs
- Years: Team
- 1971–1976: AGF Håndbold
- 1976–1978: HEI
- 1978–1981: Aarhus KFUM
National team
Years	Team	Apps	(Gls)
1974–1976	Denmark	32	(67)

Teams managed
- –: Aarhus KFUM
- 1986–1990: Denmark Women's national team
- 1999–2000: Hypo Niederösterreich
- 2000–2004: Austria Women's national team

Ole Eliasen (born 21 June 1952) is a former handball player and coach.

Eliasen played his junior years for Aarhus Fremad and AGF Håndbold. In the latter he started his senior career, and he stayed there from 1971 to 1976. He switched to Hjortshøj-Egaa Idrætsforening (1976–1978). His last club as a player was Aarhus KFUM from 1978 to 1981, where he in 1980 won the Danish Men's Handball League. He debuted for the national team in 1974 and played 32 matches, scoring 67 goals.

After his playing career Eliasen became a coach for Aarhus KFUM and Silkeborg KFUM. In the years 1986–1990 he was the coach for Denmark's women's national team. During the 1990s he coached the Austrian team Hypo Niederösterreich and later and the Austrian women's national team.

In the 1980s he said "life is too short for women's handball"; a sentence that has become infamous in Danish handball, especially during the 'Iron Ladies' golden generation in the 1990s where the Denmark Women's national team won 1996 Olympics gold medals and the World Women's Handball Championship.

Later he was the coach of IF Lyseng's handball department.

In addition to handball he has also worked at VIA University College.

== Bibliography ==
- Håndbold – et åbent spil af Ole Eliasen ISBN 978-87-87937-98-6
