= Møbelringen Cup 2007 =

The 2007 Møbelringen Cup was the 7th edition of the handball tournament Møbelringen Cup. It was held in Sandefjord, Skien and Drammen, Norway. The tournament started on 23 November 2007 and finished on 25 November. Norway won the event on goal difference ahead of Russia and Denmark.

== Results ==
Team	Pts	Pld	W	D	L	PF	PA	GD
Norway	4	3	2	0	1	83	63	+20
Russia	4	3	2	0	1	82	72	+10
Denmark	4	3	2	0	1	76	83	-7
Angola	0	3	0	0	3	66	89	-23

23 November 2007, Sandefjord

Denmark	25–24	Russia
Norway	26–17	Angola

24 November 2007, Skien

Russia	32–24	Angola
Norway	34–20	Denmark

25 November 2007, Drammen

Angola	25–31	Denmark
Norway	23–26	Russia
