= Møbelringen Cup 2014 =

Norwegian women's handball tournament

Møbelringen Cup 2014 was the 14th edition of the women's handball tournament Møbelringen Cup. It was played in Larvik and Oslo in Norway from 27 to 30 November 2014 in the lead up to 2014 European Women's Handball Championship in Hungary and Croatia. Norway was the defending champion, and Denmark won the tournament.

== Results ==
Team	Pts	Pld	W	D	L	PF	PA
Denmark	6	3	3	0	0	82	64
Norway	4	3	2	0	1	72	62
France	2	3	1	0	2	65	65
Serbia	0	3	0	0	3	56	84

27 November 2014

Serbia	18–22	France
Denmark	24–21	Norway

28 November 2014

Denmark	32–20	Serbia
Norway	21–20	France

30 November 2014

Norway	30–18	Serbia
France	23–26	Denmark

== All Star Team ==
Position	Name
Goalkeeper	(Norway) Kari Aalvik Grimsbø
Right wing	(Norway) Linn-Kristin Riegelhuth Koren
Right back	(Denmark) Kristina Kristiansen
Centre back	(France) Allison Pineau
Left back	(Denmark) Lotte Grigel
Left wing	(France) Paule Baudouin
Pivot	(Denmark) Susan Thorsgaard
