= Møbelringen Cup 2005 =

The Møbelringen Cup 2005 was the fifth edition of the Handball tournament Møbelringen Cup. It was held in Bodø, Steinkjer, and Trondheim, Norway. The tournament started on 24 November 2005 and finished on 27 November. Denmark won the event on goal difference ahead of Russia. It was the first edition, where a non-European team participated.

== Results ==
| Team | Pts | Pld | W | D | L | PF | PA | GD |
|---|---|---|---|---|---|---|---|---|
| Denmark | 5 | 3 | 2 | 1 | 0 | 100 | 69 | +31 |
| Russia | 5 | 3 | 2 | 1 | 0 | 86 | 66 | +20 |
| Norway | 2 | 3 | 1 | 0 | 2 | 74 | 81 | -7 |
| China | 0 | 3 | 0 | 0 | 3 | 65 | 109 | -44 |

All times are Central European Time (UTC+1)

| 24 November 2005; 19:00 | Norway | 31 – 25 | China | Bodø Spektrum |
| 24 November 2005; 19:00 | Thorsen 7 | (18 – 11) | Li 9 | Bodø Spektrum |
| 24 November 2005; 19:00 | | (Report) | | Bodø Spektrum |

| 25 November 2005; 19:00 | Russia | 26 – 26 | Denmark | Lånkehallen |
| 25 November 2005; 19:00 | Polenova 6 | (13 – 13) | Wangsøe, Lund 5 | Lånkehallen |
| 25 November 2005; 19:00 | | (Report) | | Lånkehallen |

| 26 November 2005; 16:15 | Norway | 21 – 25 | Russia | Steinkjerhallen |
| 26 November 2005; 16:15 | Rokne 10 | (11 – 14) | Polenova 6 | Steinkjerhallen |
| 26 November 2005; 16:15 | | (Report) | | Steinkjerhallen |

| 26 November 2005; 18:15 | Denmark | 43 – 21 | China | Meldalshallen |
| 26 November 2005; 18:15 | Bille 8 | (23 – 13) | Wang 6 | Meldalshallen |
| 26 November 2005; 18:15 | | (Report) | | Meldalshallen |

| 27 November 2005; 14:00 | China | 19 – 35 | Russia | Trondheim Spektrum |
| 27 November 2005; 14:00 | Wang, Li 7 | (9 – 20) | Bodnieva 6 | Trondheim Spektrum |
| 27 November 2005; 14:00 | | (Report) | | Trondheim Spektrum |

| 27 November 2005; 16:15 | Denmark | 31 – 22 | Norway | Trondheim Spektrum |
| 27 November 2005; 16:15 | Vestergaard, Fruelund, Brødsgaard 5 | (14 – 13) | A.H. Johansen 7 | Trondheim Spektrum |
| 27 November 2005; 16:15 | | (Report) | | Trondheim Spektrum |
