= Møbelringen Cup 2010 =

Norwegian women's handball tournament

Møbelringen Cup 2010 was the 10th edition of the women's handball tournament Møbelringen Cup. It was played in Tromsø and Bodø in Norway from 26 to 28 November 2010. Norway was the defending champion, and won the tournament for the fifth time in a row.

== Results ==
Team	Pts	Pld	W	D	L	PF	PA
Norway	6	3	3	0	0	91	57
Serbia	4	3	2	0	1	89	79
Denmark	2	3	1	0	2	69	84
Iceland	0	3	0	0	3	66	95

26 November 2010

Norway	35–14	Iceland
Denmark	21–34	Serbia

27 November 2010

Denmark	30–24	Iceland
Norway	30–25	Serbia

28 November 2010

Iceland	28–30	Serbia
Norway	26–18	Denmark
