= Intersport Cup 2019 =

Tournament details
- Host country: Norway
- Venue(s): 1 (in 1 host city)
- Dates: 26–29 September
- Teams: 4 (from 3 confederations)

Final positions
- Champions: Norway
- Runner-up: Japan
- Third place: Brazil
- Fourth place: Argentina

Tournament statistics
- Matches played: 6
- Goals scored: 307 (51.17 per match)
- Top scorer(s): (Brazil) Adriana Cardoso de Castro (Brazil) Bruna de Paula (13 goals)

The Intersport Cup 2019 was a friendly women's handball tournament held in Stavanger, Norway at the DBN Arena between 23–29 September, organised by the Norwegian Handball Federation as preparation for the home team for the 2019 World Women's Handball Championship and named Intersport for sponsorship reasons, and was a continuation of the Møbelringen Cup.

== Results ==
Team	Pld	W	D	L	GF	GA	GD	Pts
Norway	3	3	0	0	94	69	25	6
Japan	3	1	1	1	75	72	3	3
Brazil	3	1	1	1	77	75	2	3
Argentina	3	0	0	3	61	91	–30	0

== Round robin ==
All times are local (UTC+2).

September 26; 18:25	Norway	37–23	Argentina	DNB Arena, Stavanger
September 26; 18:25	Arntzen, Solberg 5	(22–12)	Karsten 5	DNB Arena, Stavanger
September 26; 18:25	3× (yellow card) 3× (suspension)	Report	2× (yellow card) 3× (suspension)	DNB Arena, Stavanger

September 26; 20:45	Brazil	26–26	Japan	DNB Arena, Stavanger
September 26; 20:45	Morena, Araújo 5	(15–15)	three players 4	DNB Arena, Stavanger
September 26; 20:45	3× (yellow card) 3× (suspension)	Report	2× (yellow card) 3× (suspension)	DNB Arena, Stavanger

September 27; 18:25	Norway	29–24	Brazil	DNB Arena, Stavanger
September 27; 18:25	Oftedal, Bakkerud 6	(13–11)	de Paula 7	DNB Arena, Stavanger
September 27; 18:25	2× (yellow card) 3× (suspension)	Report	2× (yellow card) 2× (suspension)	DNB Arena, Stavanger

September 27; 20:45	Japan	27–18	Argentina	DNB Arena, Stavanger
September 27; 20:45	Sunami 5	(15–6)	Karsten 4	DNB Arena, Stavanger
September 27; 20:45	2× (yellow card) 4× (suspension)	Report	1× (yellow card) 3× (suspension)	DNB Arena, Stavanger

September 29; 16:00	Argentina	20–27	Brazil	DNB Arena, Stavanger
September 29; 16:00	Pizzo 6	(7–13)	Rodrigues 6	DNB Arena, Stavanger
September 29; 16:00	2× (yellow card) 3× (suspension)	Report	2× (yellow card) 5× (suspension)	DNB Arena, Stavanger

September 29; 18:25	Norway	28–22	Japan	DNB Arena, Stavanger
September 29; 18:25	Waade 5	(13–8)	Hara 5	DNB Arena, Stavanger
September 29; 18:25	2× (yellow card) 2× (suspension)	Report	1× (yellow card) 4× (suspension)	DNB Arena, Stavanger

== Final standing ==
Rank	Team
Gold medal	Norway
2	Japan
3	Brazil
4	Argentina
