= Karl Erik Bøhn =

Norwegian handball player and coach (1965-2014)

Personal information
- Nationality: Norwegian
- Born: 14 February 1965
- Died: 2 February 2014 (aged 48) Oslo

Sport
- Sport: Handball

Senior clubs
- Years: Team
- –: Sandefjord Håndball
National team
Years	Team	Apps	(Gls)
1986–1993	Norway	126	(114)

Teams managed
- 2005–2011: Larvik HK
- 2011–2013: Hungary
- 2011–2012: Győri ETO KC

Karl Erik Bøhn (14 February 1965 – 2 February 2014) was a Norwegian teacher, team handball player and coach. His achievements as coach for the women's club Larvik HK include several victories in the Norwegian League and the Norwegian Cup, and participations in the Women's EHF Champions League. Starting from August 2011 he served as the head coach of the Hungarian women's national team, and since November 2011 he was also in charge of the Hungarian top division side Győri ETO KC.

== Career ==
Bøhn played 126 matches for the Norway men's national handball team between 1986 and 1993. At club level he played for Sandefjord Håndball, where he was the club captain.

He was head coach for the Norwegian women's club Larvik HK from 2005 until early 2011. Among his achievements as coach for Larvik HK were several Norwegian championships, victory in the EHF Women's Cup Winners' Cup in 2007/2008, and semifinalist in the EHF Women's Champions League in 2009/2010.

Bøhn ended his assignment with Larvik HK in January 2011, due to a controversy when Larvik player Heidi Løke, who was also Bøhn's girlfriend, signed a contract with the Hungarian club Győri ETO KC.

On 30 August 2011 Bøhn was announced as the new head coach of the Hungarian women's national team, thus becoming the first ever coach from outside Hungary to manage the national selection. He got a mandate until the 2016 Summer Olympics.

Three months later, on 23 November 2011 Bøhn took the coaching position of Hungarian top club Győri ETO KC, signing a contract until the end of that season.

Bøhn was awarded the Håndballstatuetten trophy from the Norwegian Handball Federation in 2011.

He died in Oslo on 2 February 2014, after a long fight with cancer, leukemia.

== Achievements ==
- The Norwegian League (Postenserien): Victories in 2005/2006, 2006/2007, 2007/2008, 2008/2009, 2009/2010.
- The Norwegian cup: Victories in 2005/2006, 2006/2007, 2008/2009, 2009/2010, 2010/2011
- The Norwegian championship: Victories in 2005/2006, 2006/2007, 2007/2008, 2008/2009, 2009/2010
- EHF Women's Champions League Participated in 2005/2006, 2006/2007, 2007/2008, 2008/2009, 2009/2010, 2010/2011, 2011/2012, with best achievement reaching the final in 2011/2012
- EHF Women's Cup Winners' Cup: Victory in 2007/2008.
