= Anastasia Lagina =

Russian handball player

Personal information
- Nationality: Russian
- Born: 11 August 1995 (age 31) Yaroslavl, Russia
- Height: 1.80 m (5 ft 11 in)

Sport
- Sport: Handball
- Position: Goalkeeper
- Current club: Handball Club Lada
- Number: 1

Senior clubs
- Years: Team
- 2012–2016: Zvezda Zvenigorod
- 2016–2017: KSK Luch Moscow
- 2017–2021: Handball Club Lada
- 2021: Rostov-Don
National team
| Years | Team | Apps | (Gls) |
| 2019– | Russia | 11 | (2) |
Medal record
World Championship
| Bronze medal – third place | 2019 Japan |
- Updated on 30 August 2025

Anastasia Aleksandrovna Lagina (Russian: Анастасия Александровна Лагина; born 11 August 1995) is a Russian handball player for Handball Club Lada and the Russian national handball team.

She represented Russia at the 2019 World Women's Handball Championship, where Russia won bronze medals. At the 2020 Olympics she was part of the team, but did not play a single match.

== Club career ==
Lagina started playing handball aged 9. Her senior career started at the third team of Zvezda Zvenigorod, followed by the second team, before she was promoted to the first team.

In order to find more playing time she joined KSK Luch Moscow in 2016. A year later she joined Handball Club Lada. Here she came second in the 2018, 2019 and 2020 season.

In 2021 she joined Rostov-Don. Here she won the 2022 Russian championship and 2025 Russian cup.
