= Nora Mørk =

Norwegian handball player (born 1991)

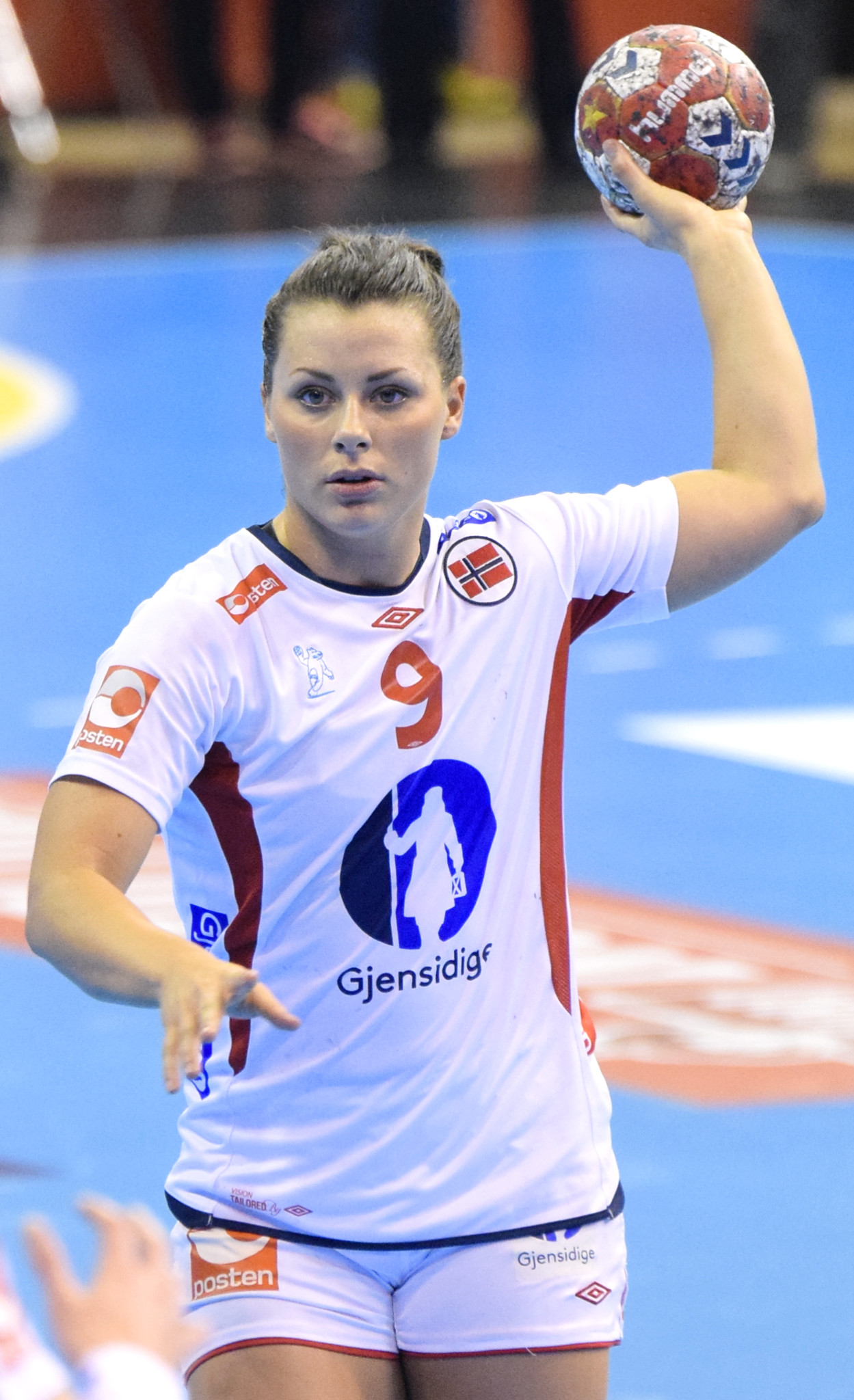
- Mørk in 2015

Personal information
- Nationality: Norwegian
- Born: 5 April 1991 (age 35) Oslo, Norway
- Height: 1.67 m (5 ft 6 in)

Sport
- Sport: Handball
- Position: Right back
- Current club: Team Esbjerg
- Number: 9

Youth career
- Years: Team
- –: Bækkelaget

Senior clubs
- Years: Team
- 2007: Bækkelaget
- 2007: Aalborg DH
- 2008: Bækkelaget
- 2008–2009: Njård IL
- 2009–2016: Larvik HK
- 2016–2019: Győri ETO KC
- 2019–2020: CSM București
- 2020–2022: Vipers Kristiansand
- 2022–: Team Esbjerg
National team
Years	Team	Apps	(Gls)
2010–	Norway	207	(958)
Medal record
Olympic Games
Gold medal – first place	2024 Paris	Team
Bronze medal – third place	2016 Rio de Janeiro	Team
Bronze medal – third place	2020 Tokyo	Team
World Championship
Gold medal – first place	2015 Denmark
Gold medal – first place	2021 Spain
Gold medal – first place	2025 Germany/Netherlands
Silver medal – second place	2017 Germany
Silver medal – second place	2023 Denmark/Norway/Sweden
European Championship
Gold medal – first place	2010 Denmark/Norway
Gold medal – first place	2014 Croatia/Hungary
Gold medal – first place	2016 Sweden
Gold medal – first place	2020 Denmark
Gold medal – first place	2022 Slovenia/North Macedonia /Montenegro
Junior World Championship
Gold medal – first place	2010 South Korea
Junior European Championship
Gold medal – first place	2009 Hungary

Nora Mørk (born 5 April 1991) is a Norwegian handball player for Team Esbjerg and the Norwegian national team.

She made her debut on the Norwegian national team on 21 September 2010.

Before joining Team Esbjerg, she played for Bækkelaget, Aalborg DH, Njård, Larvik, Győr, CSM București and Vipers Kristiansand.

Her achievements include winning the EHF Champions League six times with three clubs. She has won three gold medals and two silver medals at the IHF World Women's Handball Championship, five gold medals at the European Women's Handball Championship, and one Olympic gold medal and two Olympic bronze medals.

== Career ==
=== Club career ===
Mørk played for the clubs Bækkelaget, Aalborg DH, and Njård IL, and then for Larvik HK from 2009 to 2016. With Larvik she won the Norwegian League and the Norwegian Cup five times, and won the EHF Champions League in 2011.

From 2016 to 2019, she played for the Hungarian club Győri ETO KC, winning the Hungarian Championship three times, in 2016/2017, 2017/2018, and 2018/2019. She also won the EHF Champions League with Győri three times, in 2017, 2018, and 2019. From 2019 to 2020, she played for the Romanian club CSM București, but was injured with a raptured ACL the whole season.

She played for the club Vipers Kristiansand from 2020–2022, and won both the Norwegian League and Norwegian Cup twice with Vipers, as well as winning the EHF Champions League in 2021 and 2022.

From 2022, she started playing for the Danish club Team Esbjerg.

=== International career ===
Playing for the Norwegian national team, Mørk won gold medal at the 2010 European Women's Handball Championship, debuting as a right wing. After that Mørk had over 3 years troubling with knee injuries before making a comeback at the 2013 World Women's Handball Championship, where Norway placed 5th.

At the 2014 European Women's Handball Championship she won another gold medal, and she also was selected all-star right back of the championship. She won gold medal with Norway at the 2015 World Women's Handball Championship, and was again selected all-star right back. At the 2016 Summer Olympics she won bronze medal with Norway, and was top scorer of the tournament with a total of 62 goals.

At the 2016 European Women's Handball Championship in Sweden she won a gold medal with the Norwegian team, she was top scorer with 53 goals, and was selected all-star right back. She was also top scorer at the 2017 World Women's Handball Championship in Germany (with 66 goals), when Norway won the silver medals, after losing to France in the final. After that Mørk had another 3 years suffering from knee injuries.

She made another comeback and won another gold medal with Norway at the 2020 European Women's Handball Championship in Denmark, and was top scorer with 52 goals. At the 2020 Summer Olympics held in 2021, she was again top scorer with 62 goals, winning the bronze medal with the Norwegian team. She won gold medal with the Norwegian team at the 2021 World Women's Handball Championship, and a gold medal at the 2022 European Women's Handball Championship, where she was top scorer with 50 goals.

At the 2023 World Championship on home soil, she won a silver medal with the Norwegian team, losing to France in the final. She was the top scorer in the final with 8 goals.

At the 2025 World Championship she won her third World Championship gold medal.

== Achievements ==
=== National team ===
- Olympic Games:
  - Winner: 2024
  - Bronze Medalist: 2016, 2020
- World Championship:
  - Winner: 2015, 2021, 2025
  - Silver Medalist: 2017
- European Championship:
  - Winner: 2010, 2014, 2016, 2020, 2022
- Junior World Championship:
  - Winner: 2010
- Junior European Championship:
  - Winner: 2009

=== European ===
- EHF Champions League:
  - Winner: 2010/2011, 2016/2017, 2017/2018, 2018/2019, 2020/2021, 2021/2022
  - Bronze medalist: 2023/2024

=== Domestic ===
- Norwegian League:
  - Winner: 2009/2010, 2010/2011, 2013/2014, 2014/2015, 2015/2016, 2020/2021, 2021/2022
- Norwegian Cup:
  - Winner: 2009, 2010, 2013, 2014, 2015, 2020, 2021
- Hungarian Championship:
  - Winner: 2016/2017, 2017/2018, 2018/2019
- Romanian Supercup:
  - Winner: 2019
- Danish League:
  - Winner: 2023, 2024, 2026
- Danish Cup:
  - Winner: 2022, 2023, 2024

== Individual awards ==
MVP

- Most Valuable Player of the Junior European Championship: 2009
- Most Valuable Player of Postenligaen: 2013/2014
- Most Valuable Player of Grundigligaen: 2014/2015, 2015/2016

Top Scorer

- Topscorer of the Summer Olympics: 2016 (62 goals), 2020 (52 goals)
- Topscorer of the European Championship: 2016 (53 goals), 2020 (52 goals), 2022 (50 goals)
- Topscorer of the World Championship: 2017 (66 goals)

All-Star Team

- All-Star Right Back of the European Youth Championship: 2007
- All-Star Right Back of the European Open Championship: 2008
- All-Star Right Back of Eliteserien: 2008/2009
- All-Star Right Back of the Junior European Championship: 2009
- All-Star Right Wing of Eliteserien: 2009/2010
- All-Star Right Wing of Postenligaen: 2010/2011
- All-Star Right Back of Postenligaen: 2013/2014
- All-Star Right Back of the European Championship: 2014, 2016, 2020
- All-Star Right Back of Grundigligaen: 2014/2015, 2015/2016
- All-Star Right Back of the World Championship: 2015, 2017, 2021
- All-Star Right Back of the EHF Champions League: 2015, 2016, 2017, 2021, 2022
- All-Star Right Back of Møbelringen Cup: 2015, 2017

Others

- NISO Best Young Player of the Year: 2008
- Best Rookie of Eliteserien: 2008/2009
- Foreign Handballer of the Year in Hungary: 2017
- Handball-Planet.com All-Star Right Back: 2015, 2016, 2020, 2021
- Handball-Planet.com Player of the Year: 2017, 2021
- EHF Excellence Awards Best right back of the season: 2022/23

== Personal life ==
She is the twin sister of Thea Mørk.

She is in a relationship with fellow handballer, Jerry Tollbring. On 28 October 2024, they announced they were expecting their first child in May 2025. She gave birth to a daughter in May 2025.
