= Olga Shcherbak =

Russian handball player

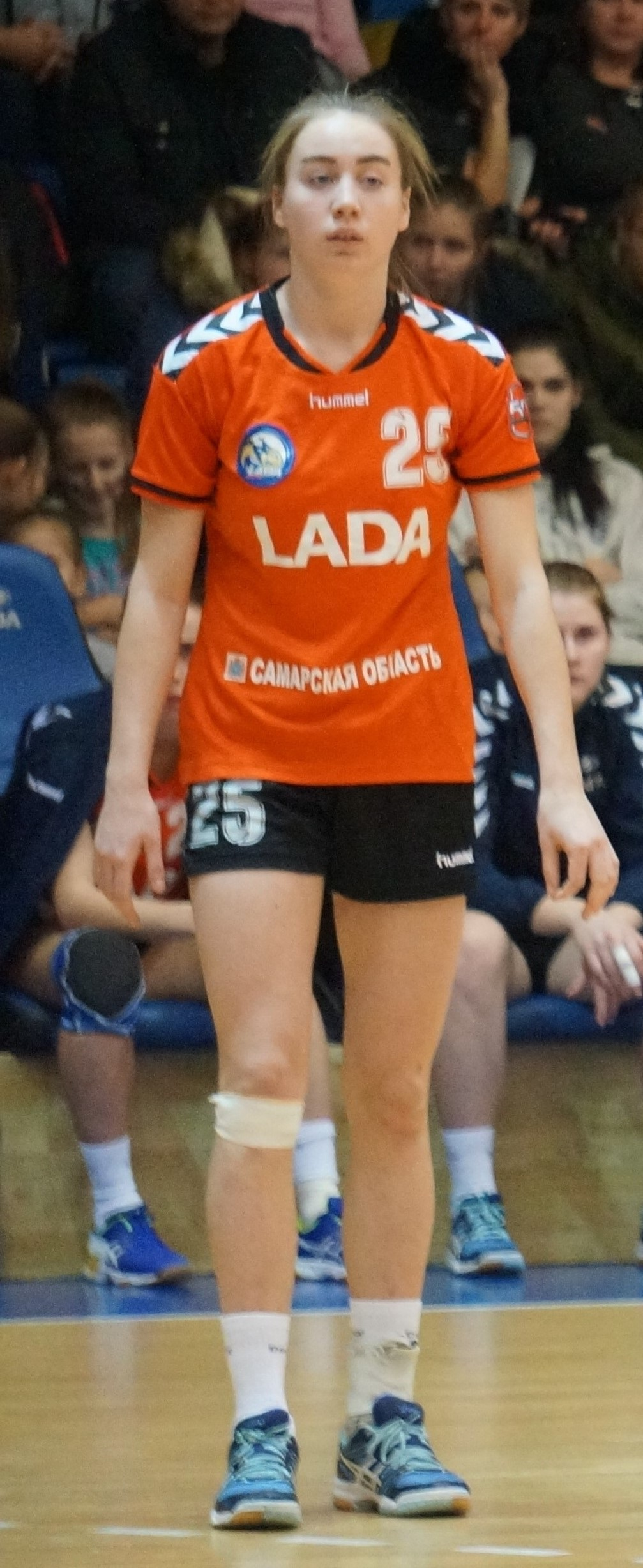

Personal information
- Full name: Olga Viktorovna Shcherbak
- Nationality: Russian
- Born: 14 March 1998 (age 28) Sevastopol, Ukraine
- Height: 1.77 m (5 ft 10 in)

Sport
- Sport: Handball
- Position: Back
- Current club: HC CSKA Moscow
- Number: 86

Senior clubs
- Years: Team
- 2016–2023: Handball Club Lada
- 2023–: HC CSKA Moscow
National team
Years	Team	Apps	(Gls)
2021–	Russia	2	(5)
- Updated on 19 August 2024

Olga Viktorovna Shcherbak (Russian: Ольга Викторовна Щербак; born 14 March 1998) is a Russian handball player who plays for HC CSKA Moscow.

== Achievements ==
- Russian Super League:
  - Winner: 2024, 2025
  - Silver Medalist: 2017, 2018, 2019, 2020
- Russian Cup:
  - Winner: 2024, 2025
