= Yevgeni Trefilov =

Russian handball coach

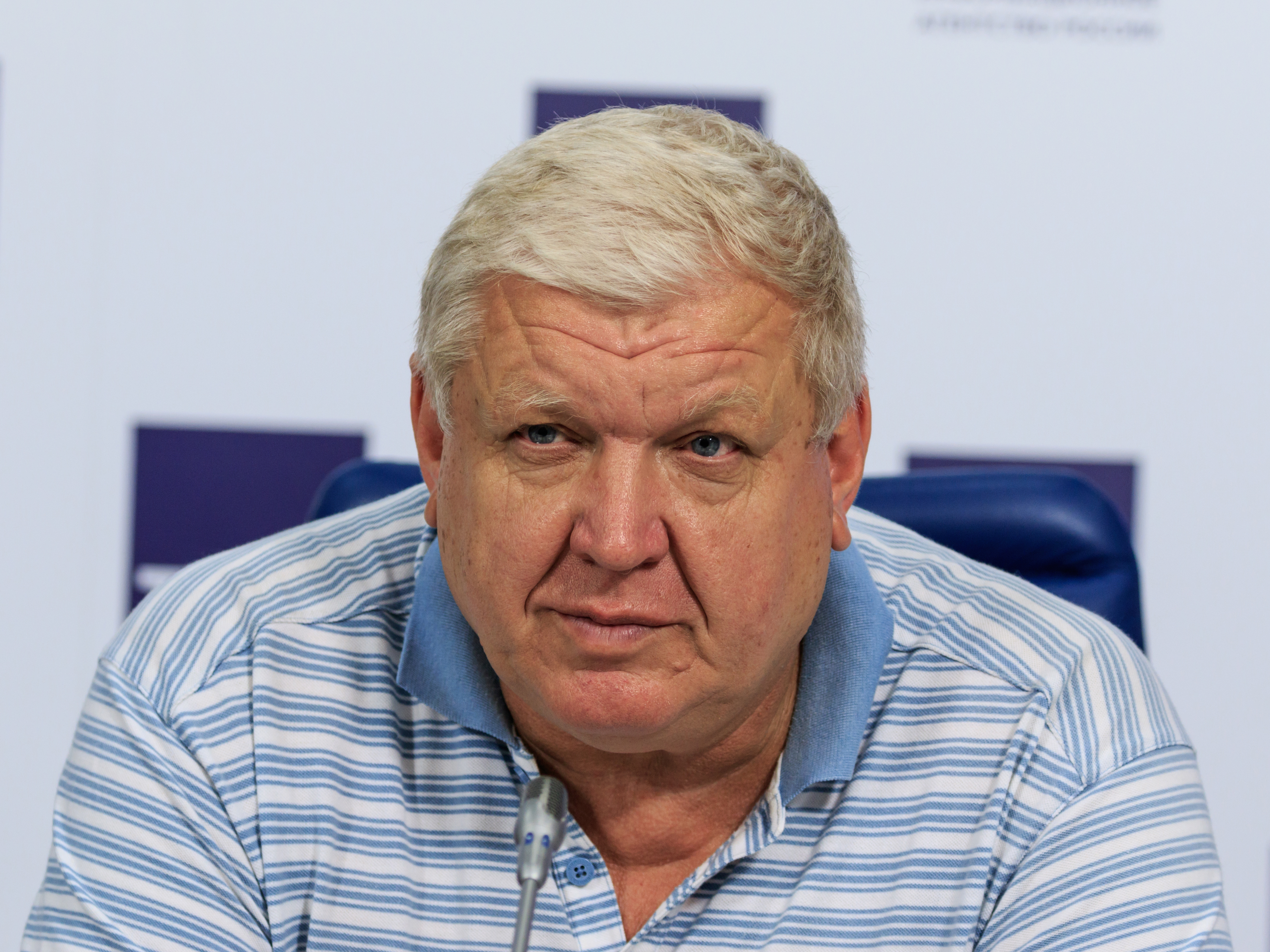
- Trefilov in 2016

Personal information
- Nicknames: King Tref (King of Clubs, Король Треф)
- Born: 4 September 1955 (age 71) Khutor Bezlesny, Ust-Labinsky District, Krasnodar Krai, Russian SFSR, Soviet Union

Yevgeni Vasilyevich Trefilov (Russian: Евгений Васильевич Трефилов; born 4 September 1955) is a former handball head coach of the Russian women's national team. He has led the Russian team to win the IHF World Women's Handball Championship four times, in 2001, 2005, 2007 and 2009. He rejoined the national team on 16 September 2013. Under his supervision, Russia won the 2016 Summer Olympics.

He coached Lada Togliatti to the Cup Winners’ Cup title and Zvezda Zvenigorod to their titles in the EHF Cup and the Champions League. Zvezda Zvenigorod was the first ever debutant to win the Champions League trophy.

Trefilov is known for his dictatorial style of coaching and physical abuse of female athletes. Despite this, he was highly regarded in the former Soviet Union and is now in Russia. Trefilov considers himself a Soviet patriot and has espoused xenophobic views.
