= Møbelringen Cup 2009 =

Møbelringen Cup 2009 was the ninth edition of the International handball tournament Møbelringen Cup. It was held in Norway, in the cities of Orkanger and Trondheim. The tournament started on 20 November and finished on 22 November 2009. Norway won the event by winning all their matches.

== Results ==
Team	Pts	Pld	W	D	L	PF	PA
Norway	6	3	3	0	0	92	80
Russia	4	2	0	1	1	89	88
Romania	2	3	1	0	2	90	93
Croatia	0	3	0	0	3	84	94

20 November 2009, Orkanger

Romania	31–33	Russia
Norway	31–28	Croatia

21 November 2009, Trondheim

Russia	35–30	Croatia
Norway	34–31	Romania

22 November 2009, Trondheim

Croatia	26–28	Romania
Norway	27–21	Russia
