= Daria Dmitrieva (handballer) =

Russian handball player (born 1995)

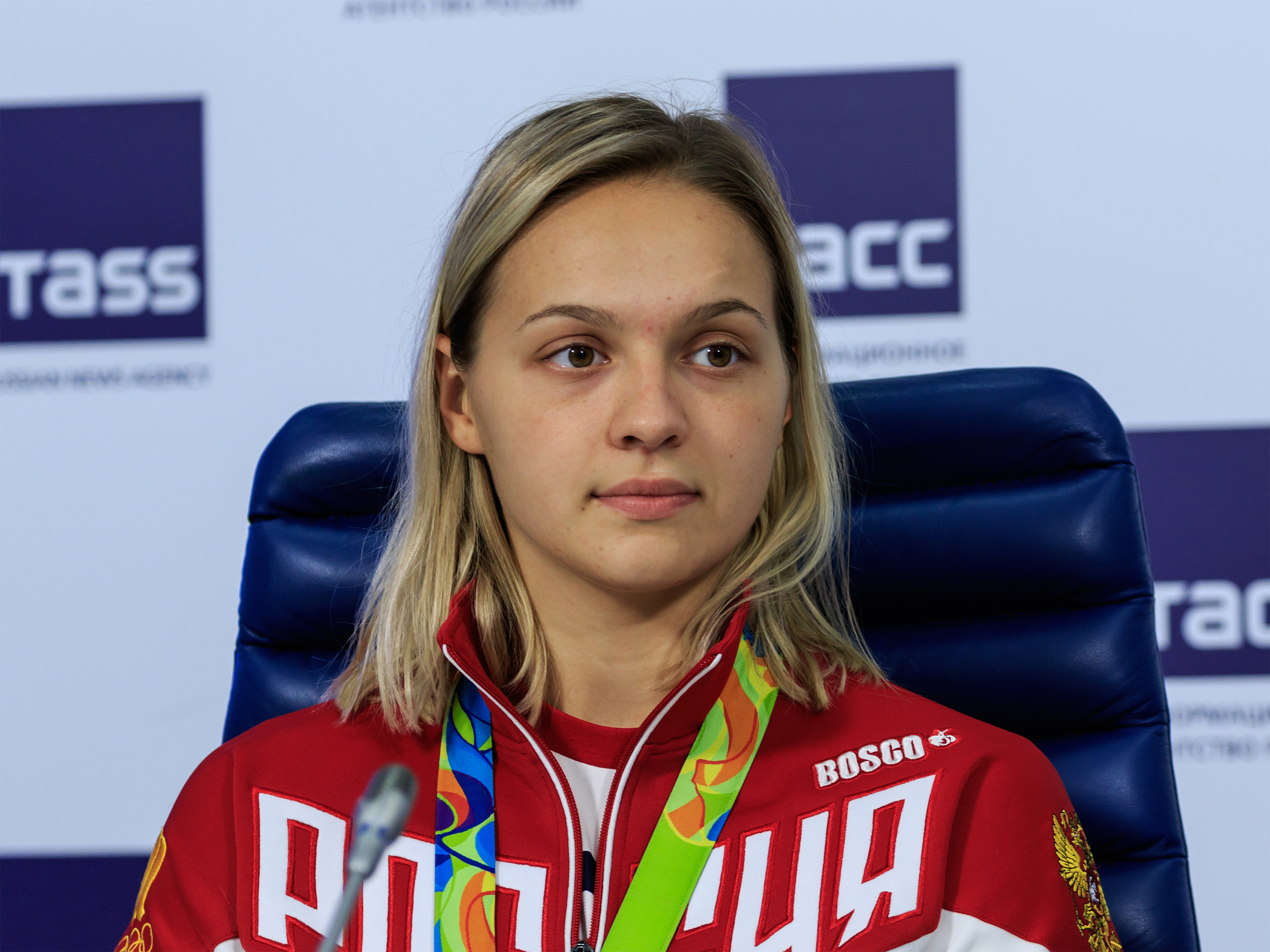
- Dmitrieva in 2016

Personal information
- Full name: Daria Evgenyevna Dmitrieva
- Nationality: Russian
- Born: 9 August 1995 (age 31) Tolyatti, Russia
- Height: 1.78 m (5 ft 10 in)

Sport
- Sport: Handball
- Position: Centre back
- Current club: Ferencvárosi TC
- Number: 11

Youth career
- Years: Team
- –2009: Lada Togliatti
- 2009–2015: Dinamo Volgograd
- 2015: Lada Togliatti

Senior clubs
- Years: Team
- 2011–2015: Dinamo Volgograd
- 2015–2019: Lada Togliatti
- 2019–2022: HBC CSKA Moscow
- 2022–2024: RK Krim
- 2024–2026: Ferencvárosi TC
- 2026–: CSM București
National team
Years	Team	Apps	(Gls)
2013–2021	Russia	104	(352)
Medal record
Representing ROC
Olympic Games
Silver medal – second place	2020 Tokyo	Team
Representing Russia
Olympic Games
Gold medal – first place	2016 Rio de Janeiro	Team
European Championship
Silver medal – second place	2018 France	Team
IHF Junior World Championship
Silver medal – second place	2014 Croatia	Team
World Youth Championship
Silver medal – second place	2012 Montenegro	Team
European Junior Championship
Gold medal – first place	2013 Denmark	Team
European Youth Championship
Gold medal – first place	2011 Czech Republic	Team

Daria Evgenyevna Dmitrieva (Russian: Дарья Евгеньевна Дмитриева; born 9 August 1995) is a Russian female handballer, who plays for Romanian club CSM București and Russian national team.

== Biography ==
=== Childhood and youth handball ===
Dmitrieva's father is a former ice hockey player. She trained under Irina Kos at Lada Togliatti, but when the coach decided to leave, Dmitrieva and some of her teammates joined the other Russian handball center in Volgograd. Dmitrieva was a 14-year-old when she made that decision in 2009. She instead joined Dinamo Volgograd, where she made her senior debut. With Volgograd, she won the 2013 and 2014 Russian Championship.

Dmitrieva and Anna Vyakhireva were considered the rising stars at the 2013 European Junior Championship. She was also voted world's second best young playmaker of the 2013/2014 season by the Handball-Planet.com fans, after Deborah Nunes.

=== Return to Lada ===
In 2015, Dmitrieva returned to Lada Togliatti.

=== CSKA Moscow ===
After 4 years, Dmitrieva joined HBC CSKA Moscow.

In August 2019, she ruptured her achilles during a friendly game. She only returned to the team for the 2020-21 season. In 2021, she won the Russian championship.

In August 2021, she decided to take a break from her professional handball career, due to exhaustion. She returned to her club, HBC CSKA Moscow after missing the first half of the season.

=== RK Krim ===
For the 2022-23 season, Dmitrieva joined Slovenian top club RK Krim on loan. Here, she won both the Slovenian cup and championship. She returned to CSKA in May 2023, where she could play in the final games of the Russian championship. Here, she won her second championship in the same season.

The following season, she joined RK Krim on a permanent basis.

=== Ferencváros ===
In the summer of 2024, Dmitrieva joined Hungarian side Ferencvárosi TC.

== National team ==
=== Youth national teams ===
Dmitrieva was part of the Russian team that won the 2011 U17 European Championship. In the same year, she played at the U19 European Championship. With 43 goals, she scored the 5th most goals at the tournament.

A year later, she won silver medals at the 2012 U18 World Championship, losing to Denmark in the final. The same year, she plated at the U20 World Championship, where she played a single game.

At the 2013 U19 European Championship, she won a gold medal with the Russian team, as was selected for the tournament all star team.

At the 2014 U20 World Championship, she won silver medals, and was once again part of the tournament all star team.

=== Senior national team ===
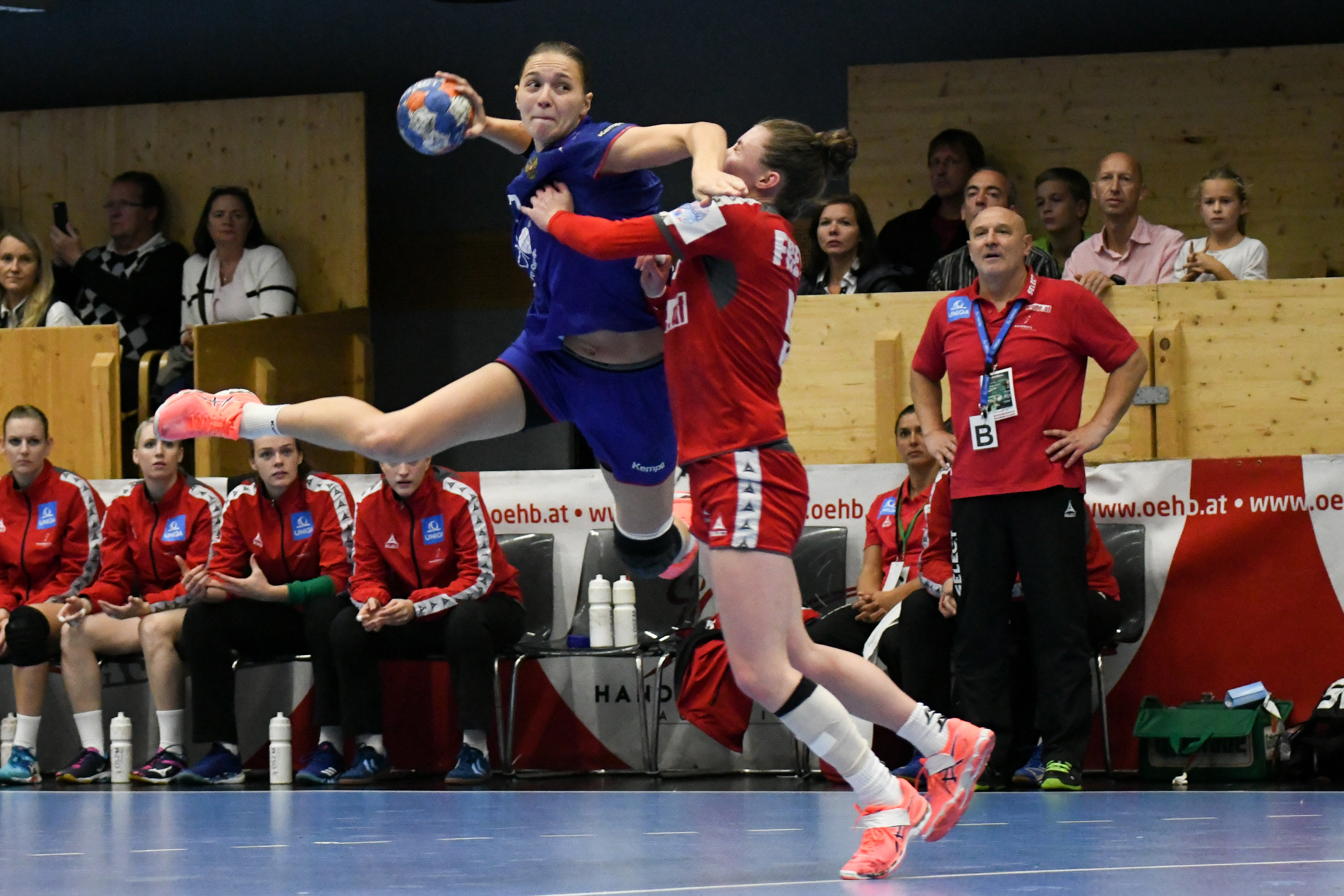
Dmitrieva (with the Ball) against Austria's Sonja Frey

In 2014, Dmitrieva was for the first time part of the Russian senior national team at the 2014 European Championship. The Russian team went out in the group stage.

A year later, she represented Russia at the 2015 World Championship, where Russia finished 5th.

At the 2016 Olympics, she won gold medals. She scored 28 goals and was selected for the tournament allstar team.

She then represented Russia at the 2016 European Championship and 2017 World Championship without winning anything. At the 2018 European Championship, she won her second international medal, when Russia won silver medals, losing to France in the final.

She missed the 2019 World Championship due to injury. She was back in the Russian team for the 2020 European Championship, where Russia finished 5th.

After her return, she won silver medals at the 2020 Olympics, once again losing to France in the final. Dmitrieva scored 33 goals during the tournament.

== Achievements ==
- Russian Super League:
  - Gold Medalist: 2012, 2013, 2014, 2021, 2023
- Slovenian Championship

Gold Medalist: 2023, 2024

- Slovenian Cup

Gold Medalist: 2023

- EHF Cup Winners' Cup:
  - Semifinalist: 2012
- European Junior Championship:
  - Gold Medalist: 2013
- World Youth Championship:
  - Silver Medalist: 2012
- European Youth Championship:
  - Gold Medalist: 2011

== Individual awards ==
- All-Star Playmaker of the European Junior Championship: 2013
- All-Star Playmaker of the World Junior Championship: 2014
- All-Star Centre Back of the Summer Olympics: 2016
- Handball-Planet.com World Young Female Handball Player: 2014–15
- Handball-Planet.com World Young Female Playmaker: 2014–15
- All star team of the Møbelringen Cup 2016
