= Posten Cup 2023 =

Tournament details
- Host country: Norway
- Venue(s): 2 (in 2 host cities)
- Dates: 23–26 November
- Teams: 4 (from 2 confederations)

Final positions
- Champions: Norway
- Runner-up: Poland
- Third place: Angola
- Fourth place: Iceland

Tournament statistics
- Matches played: 6
- Goals scored: 326 (54.33 per match)
- Attendance: 9,404 (1,567 per match)
- Top scorer(s): (Angola) Natália Bernardo (23 goals)

The Posten Cup 2023 was a friendly women's handball tournament held between 23 and 26 November 2023, organised by the Norwegian Handball Federation as preparation for the home team for the 2023 World Women's Handball Championship and named Posten Cup for sponsorship reasons. Norway won the tournament. This was the first edition, where it was called Posten Cup, after previously having the name Intersport Cup. It was hosted in Boligpartner Arena in Hamar and Håkons Hall i Lillehammer.

== Arenas ==
(Norway) Hamar	(Norway) Lillehammer
Boligpartner Arena; Capacity: 1,715	Håkons Hall; Capacity: 11,500

== Results ==
Team	Pld	W	D	L	GF	GA	GD	Pts
Norway	3	3	0	0	90	70	+20	6
Poland	3	2	0	1	87	80	+7	4
Angola	3	1	0	2	81	89	-8	2
Iceland	3	0	0	3	68	87	-19	0

== Round robin ==
All times are local (UTC+2).

23 November; 16:45	Poland	29-23	Iceland	Boligpartner Arena, Hamar; Attendance: 667; Referees: Borge, Nygren
23 November; 16:45	Rosiak 5	(14-10)	three players 4	Boligpartner Arena, Hamar; Attendance: 667; Referees: Borge, Nygren
23 November; 16:45	1× (yellow card) 6× (suspension)	Rapport	5× (suspension)	Boligpartner Arena, Hamar; Attendance: 667; Referees: Borge, Nygren

November 23; 19:15	Norway	32–24	Angola	Boligpartner Arena, Hamar; Attendance: 1600; Referees: Pepe, Merisi
November 23; 19:15	Herrem 5	(16-14)	Bernardo 8	Boligpartner Arena, Hamar; Attendance: 1600; Referees: Pepe, Merisi
November 23; 19:15	3× (suspension)	Rapport	3× (suspension)	Boligpartner Arena, Hamar; Attendance: 1600; Referees: Pepe, Merisi

November 25; 16:45	Norway	31–21	Iceland	Håkons Hall, Lillehammer; Attendance: 3,583; Referees: Pepe, Merisi
November 25; 16:45	Ingstad 6	(20–8)	Erlingsdóttir 8	Håkons Hall, Lillehammer; Attendance: 3,583; Referees: Pepe, Merisi
November 25; 16:45	2× (suspension)	Rapport	3× (suspension)	Håkons Hall, Lillehammer; Attendance: 3,583; Referees: Pepe, Merisi

November 25; 19:15	Angola	30–33	Poland	Håkons Hall, Lillehammer; Attendance: 300; Referees: Borge, Nygren
November 25; 19:15	Bernardo 9	(14–19)	Balsam 7	Håkons Hall, Lillehammer; Attendance: 300; Referees: Borge, Nygren
November 25; 19:15	5× (suspension)	Rapport	4× (suspension)	Håkons Hall, Lillehammer; Attendance: 300; Referees: Borge, Nygren

November 26; 14:45	Norway	27–25	Poland	Håkons Hall, Lillehammer; Attendance: 3,004; Referees: Pepe, Merisi
November 26; 14:45	Herrem 5	(15–10)	Galińska 6	Håkons Hall, Lillehammer; Attendance: 3,004; Referees: Pepe, Merisi
November 26; 14:45	2× (suspension)	Rapport	3× (suspension)	Håkons Hall, Lillehammer; Attendance: 3,004; Referees: Pepe, Merisi

November 26; 17:15	Iceland	24–27	Angola	Håkons Hall, Lillehammer; Attendance: 250; Referees: Borge, Nygren
November 26; 17:15	Ásgeirsdóttir 5	(11–13)	Bernardo 6	Håkons Hall, Lillehammer; Attendance: 250; Referees: Borge, Nygren
November 26; 17:15	3× (suspension)		1× (yellow card) 7× (suspension)	Håkons Hall, Lillehammer; Attendance: 250; Referees: Borge, Nygren
