= Denmark women's national handball team =

Women's national handball team representing Denmark

Denmark

Information
- Nickname: Håndboldkvinderne (The handball women)
- Association: Danish Handball Federation
- Coach: Helle Thomsen
- Assistant coach: Bojana Popović
- Captain: Trine Østergaard; Anne Mette Hansen; Anna Kristensen; Mie Højlund
- Most caps: Janne Kolling (250)
- Most goals: Camilla Andersen (846)

Colours
1st	2nd

Results

Summer Olympics
- Appearances: 5 (First in 1996)
- Best result: (gold) 1st (1996, 2000, 2004)

World Championship
- Appearances: 23 (First in 1957)
- Best result: (gold) 1st (1997)

European Championship
- Appearances: 16 (First in 1994)
- Best result: (gold) 1st (1994, 1996, 2002)
- Last updated on Unknown.

Denmark women's national handball team
Medal record

Olympic Games
Gold medal – first place	1996 Atlanta	Team
Gold medal – first place	2000 Sydney	Team
Gold medal – first place	2004 Athens	Team
Bronze medal – third place	2024 Paris	Team

World Championship
Gold medal – first place	1997 Germany	
Silver medal – second place	1962 Romania	
Silver medal – second place	1993 Norway	
Bronze medal – third place	1995 Austria/Hungary	
Bronze medal – third place	2013 Serbia	
Bronze medal – third place	2021 Spain	
Bronze medal – third place	2023 Denmark/Norway/Sweden	

European Championship
Gold medal – first place	1994 Germany	
Gold medal – first place	1996 Denmark	
Gold medal – first place	2002 Denmark	
Silver medal – second place	1998 Netherlands	
Silver medal – second place	2004 Hungary	
Silver medal – second place	2022 Slovenia/Montenegro/North Macedonia	
Silver medal – second place	2024 Austria/Hungary/Switzerland	

The Denmark women's national handball team is the national team of Denmark. It is governed by the Danish Handball Federation (DHF).

In 1997, it became the first Women's Handball team to hold all three major titles simultaneously (The World Championship, The Olympic Championship and The European Championship).

Denmark women's handball team is the only team (women's and men's) in handball history to win the Olympic Games three consecutive times, earning the gold medal in 1996, 2000, and 2004.

Despite tremendous results, the Danish handball team has seen a steady decline. As of 2026, the team has not won a gold medal since the Olympic Games 2004. However, at the World Championship 2013, the team won its first medal (bronze) at a World Championship since 1997 when the team won gold. It was also the first medal the Danish team had won in 9 years.

Since 2021, the team has won medals at five championships in a row: Bronze at the 2021 World Championship, silver at the 2022 European Championship, bronze at the 2023 World Championship, bronze at 2024 Summer Olympics and silver at the 2024 European Championship. At the 2025 World Championship, Denmark was knocked out in the quarter final, marking the first time since 2021 that Denmark left a major international tournament without any medals.

== Honours ==
Competition	1st place, gold medalist(s)	2nd place, silver medalist(s)	3rd place, bronze medalist(s)	Total
Olympic Games	3	0	1	4
World Championship	1	2	4	7
European Championship	3	4	0	7
Total	7	6	5	18

== Competitive record ==
Champions Runners-up Third place Fourth place

=== Olympic Games ===
Games	Position	Pld	W	D	L	GF	GA	GD
(Canada) 1976 Montreal	Did not qualify							
(Soviet Union) 1980 Moscow	Did not qualify							
(United States) 1984 Los Angeles	Did not qualify							
(South Korea) 1988 Seoul	Did not qualify							
(Spain) 1992 Barcelona	Did not qualify							
(United States) 1996 Atlanta	1st	5	5	0	0	149	114	+35
(Australia) 2000 Sydney	1st	7	6	0	1	214	165	+49
(Greece) 2004 Athens	1st	7	5	2	0	224	182	+42
(China) 2008 Beijing	Did not qualify							
(United Kingdom) 2012 London	9th	5	1	0	4	113	121	−8
(Brazil) 2016 Rio de Janeiro	Did not qualify							
(Japan) 2020 Tokyo	Did not qualify							
(France) 2024 Paris	3rd	8	6	0	2	206	191	+15
(United States) 2028 Los Angeles	TBD							
Total	5/14	32	23	2	7	906	773	+133

=== World Championship ===
Year	Position	Pld	W	D	L	GS	GA	±
(Socialist Federal Republic of Yugoslavia) 1957	5th	5	3	1	1	37	26	+11
(Romania) 1962	2nd	5	4	0	1	42	28	+14
(West Germany) 1965	5th	4	2	0	2	31	36	−5
(Netherlands) 1971	6th	5	2	1	2	50	54	−4
(Socialist Federal Republic of Yugoslavia) 1973	7th	5	2	2	1	57	47	+10
(Soviet Union) 1975	9th	5	1	0	4	62	69	−7
(Czechoslovakia) 1978	Did not qualify							
(Hungary) 1982	Did not qualify							
(Netherlands) 1986	Did not qualify							
(South Korea) 1990	10th	7	2	0	5	145	137	+8
(Norway) 1993	2nd	7	5	0	2	189	167	+22
(Austria) (Hungary) 1995	3rd	8	6	0	2	221	178	+43
(Germany) 1997	1st	9	7	1	1	281	202	+79
(Denmark) (Norway) 1999	6th	9	7	0	2	263	186	+77
(Italy) 2001	4th	9	7	0	2	258	210	+48
(Croatia) 2003	13th	5	2	1	2	113	119	−6
(Russia) 2005	4th	10	5	1	4	295	277	+18
(France) 2007	Did not qualify							
(China) 2009	5th	9	6	0	3	250	230	+20
(Brazil) 2011	4th	9	7	0	2	240	175	+65
(Serbia) 2013	3rd	9	6	0	3	255	214	+41
(Denmark) 2015	6th	9	5	0	4	239	208	+31
(Germany) 2017	6th	7	4	0	3	186	163	+23
(Japan) 2019	9th	8	4	2	2	204	172	+32
(Spain) 2021	3rd	9	8	0	1	281	182	+99
(Denmark) (Norway) (Sweden) 2023	3rd	9	7	0	2	280	212	+68
(Germany) (Netherlands) 2025	5th	7	6	0	1	240	181	+59
(Hungary) 2027	TBD							
(Spain) 2029	TBD							
(Czech Republic) (Poland) 2031	TBD							
Total	23/28	162	102	9	51	3979	3292	+687

=== European Championship ===
Year	Position	Pld	W	D	L	GS	GA	±
(Germany) 1994	1st	7	7	0	0	186	151	+35
(Denmark) 1996	1st	7	7	0	0	197	146	+51
(Netherlands) 1998	2nd	7	5	0	2	189	163	+26
(Romania) 2000	10th	6	1	1	4	151	159	−8
(Denmark) 2002	1st	8	8	0	0	200	171	+29
(Hungary) 2004	2nd	8	6	0	2	202	189	+13
(Sweden) 2006	11th	6	2	0	4	148	156	−8
(North Macedonia) 2008	11th	6	2	1	3	145	160	−15
(Denmark) (Norway) 2010	4th	8	5	0	3	192	175	+17
(Serbia) 2012	5th	7	5	0	2	217	206	+11
(Hungary) (Croatia) 2014	8th	6	3	1	2	155	147	+8
(Sweden) 2016	4th	8	4	1	3	189	185	+4
(France) 2018	8th	6	3	0	3	151	164	−13
(Denmark) 2020	4th	8	5	0	3	209	186	+23
(Slovenia) (North Macedonia) (Montenegro) 2022	2nd	8	6	0	2	223	195	+28
(Austria) (Hungary) (Switzerland) 2024	2nd	9	7	0	2	266	234	+32
(Czech Republic) (Poland) (Romania) (Slovakia) (Turkey) 2026	Qualified							
(Denmark) (Norway) (Sweden) 2028	Qualified as co-host							
(Belgium) (France) 2030	To be determined							
(Denmark) (Germany) (Poland) 2032	Qualified as co-host							
Total	18/20	115	76	4	35	3020	2787	+233

=== Performance in other tournaments ===
- Carpathian Trophy 1980 – Fifth place
- Carpathian Trophy 1997 – Winner
- GF World Cup '06 – Third place
- GF World Cup '08 – Second place
- Møbelringen Cup 2002 – Winner
- Møbelringen Cup 2003 – Third place
- Møbelringen Cup 2005 – Winner
- Møbelringen Cup 2007 – Third place
- Møbelringen Cup 2008 – Third place
- Møbelringen Cup 2010 – Second place
- Møbelringen Cup 2012 – Second place
- Møbelringen Cup 2014 – Winner
- Møbelringen Cup 2016 – Second place
- Møbelringen Cup 2018 – Third place
- Intersport Cup 2022 – Second place
- Golden League 2012-13 – Winner
- Golden League 2014-15 – Winner
- Golden League 2016-17 – Third place

== Team ==
=== Current squad ===
The squad chosen for the 2026 European Women's Handball Championship.

Head coach: Helle Thomsen

Caps and goals as of 9 November 2026.

No.	Pos.	Name	Date of birth (age)	Height	App.	Goals	Club
1	GK	Sandra Toft	18 October 1989 (age 37)	1.74 m	199	2	(Hungary) Győri ETO KC
2	CB	Stine Nørklit Lønborg	21 December 1998 (age 27)	1.70 m	7	9	(France) JDA Dijon Handball
4	RB	Helene Kindberg	13 January 1998 (age 28)	1.79 m	31	46	(Denmark) Team Esbjerg
6	CB	Helena Elver	1 March 1998 (age 28)	1.75 m	62	148	(Hungary) Győri ETO KC
8	LB	Anne Mette Hansen (c)	25 August 1994 (age 32)	1.82 m	209	606	(Romania) CSM București
10	P	Kathrine Heindahl	26 March 1992 (age 34)	1.82 m	150	287	(Denmark) Ikast Håndbold
12	GK	Anna Kristensen (c)	25 October 2000 (age 26)	1.84 m	66	0	(Hungary) Ferencvárosi TC
15	P	Sofie Bardrum	3 April 1996 (age 30)	1.75 m	13	37	(Denmark) Viborg HK
23	CB	Kristina Jørgensen	17 January 1998 (age 28)	1.87 m	157	482	(France) Metz Handball
25	RW	Trine Østergaard (c)	17 October 1991 (age 35)	1.66 m	224	478	(Denmark) Viborg HK
28	LB	Laura Borg	21 February 2004 (age 22)	1.87 m	24	7	(Denmark) Ikast Håndbold
32	LB	Mie Højlund (c)	24 October 1997 (age 29)	1.80 m	129	276	(Denmark) Odense Håndbold
33	LW	Emma Friis	31 October 1999 (age 27)	1.62 m	99	286	(Romania) CSM București
41	LW	Elma Halilcevic	18 June 2000 (age 26)	1.68 m	60	146	(Denmark) Odense Håndbold
42	CB	Michala Møller	16 February 2000 (age 26)	1.78 m	65	133	(Hungary) Ferencvárosi TC
44	RW	Cecilie Brandt	16 November 2001 (age 25)	1.69 m	28	48	(Denmark) Ikast Håndbold
45	LB	Julie Scaglione	20 August 2004 (age 22)	1.83 m	32	99	(Denmark) Team Esbjerg

=== Extended squad / recent call-ups ===
No.	Pos.	Name	Date of birth (age)	Height	App.	Goals	Club
7	P	Ida-Marie Dahl	19 March 1998 (age 28)	1.74 m	15	20	(France) JDA Dijon Handball
26	LB	Stine Eiberg ^{TOP}	25 November 1998 (age 27)	1.83 m	21	6	(Denmark) Nykøbing Falster Håndboldklub
34	P	Rikke Iversen	18 May 1993 (age 33)	1.78 m	103	156	(Denmark) Team Esbjerg
35	P	Nanna Hinnerfeldt	11 June 1999 (age 27)	1.72 m	19	24	(Denmark) Nykøbing Falster Håndboldklub
40	GK	Amalie Milling ^{TOP}	27 December 1999 (age 26)	1.74 m	29	0	(Denmark) Ikast Håndbold
43	LW	Emilie Ytting	2 August 1999 (age 27)	1.76 m	6	6	(Denmark) København Håndbold
49	LB	Alberte Hovgaard-Hansen	10 December 2004 (age 21)	1.70 m	0	0	(Denmark) Nykøbing Falster Håndboldklub

=== Inaccessible at the moment ===
No.	Pos.	Name	Date of birth (age)	Height	App.	Goals	Club
11	LB	Line Haugsted ^{PRE}	11 November 1994 (age 32)	1.80 m	130	155	(Denmark) Team Esbjerg
16	GK	Althea Reinhardt ^{INJ}	1 September 1996 (age 30)	1.80 m	131	0	(Denmark) Odense Håndbold
18	RB	Mette Tranborg ^{UNV}	1 January 1996 (age 30)	1.92 m	130	283	(Hungary) Ferencvárosi TC
21	RW	Andrea Aagot ^{PRE}	22 May 2000 (age 26)	1.78 m	66	141	(Denmark) Odense Håndbold
37	LB	Sarah Paulsen^{INJ}	27 August 1997 (age 29)	1.72 m	12	18	(Poland) MKS Lublin
50	GK	Anne Christine Bossen ^{INJ}	14 October 2003 (age 23)	1.76 m	2	0	(Denmark) Nykøbing Falster Håndboldklub

Notes

- ^{INJ} = Injured
- ^{PRS} = Preliminary squad
- ^{RET} = Retired from the national team
- ^{SBY} = Standby player
- ^{TOP} = Train-on player
- ^{UNV} = Unavailable for selection
- ^{PRE} = Pregnant or maternity leave

=== Notable players ===
Several Danish players have seen their individual performance recognized at international tournaments, either as Most Valuable Player or as a member of the All-Star Team.

MVP

- Anja Andersen, 1996 European Championship
- Karin Mortensen, 2002 European Championship
- Anna Kristensen, 2024 European Championship

All-Star Team

- Anette Hoffmann, 1995 World Championship; 2000 Summer Olympics
- Anja Andersen, 1996 Summer Olympics
- Susanne Munk Wilbek, 1996 Summer Olympics; 1997 World Championship
- Camilla Andersen, 1997 World Championship; 1998 European Championship
- Tonje Kjærgaard, 1998 European Championship; 1999 World Championship
- Janne Kolling, 1998 European Championship; 2000 Summer Olympics
- Mette Vestergaard, 2001 World Championship
- Kristine Andersen, 2002 European Championship
- Line Daugaard, 2002 European Championship; 2004 Summer Olympics
- Karin Mortensen, 2002 and 2004 European Championship
- Rikke Schmidt, 2004 Summer Olympics
- Katrine Fruelund, 2004 Summer Olympics
- Josephine Touray, 2004 European Championship
- Mie Augustesen, 2010 European Championship
- Maibritt Kviesgaard, 2010 European Championship
- Line Jørgensen, 2011 World Championship
- Maria Fisker, 2013 World Championship; 2014 European Championship
- Kristina Kristiansen, 2014 European Championship
- Sandra Toft, 2016 and 2020 European Championship, 2021 World Championship
- Line Haugsted, 2020 European Championship
- Emma Friis, 2022 European Championship, 2024 Summer Olympics, 2024 European Championship
- Kathrine Heindahl, 2022 European Championship
- Louise Burgaard, 2023 World Championship
- Anna Kristensen, 2024 European Championship

Incomplete

=== Coaching staff ===
Role	Name	Start date
Head coach	(Denmark) Helle Thomsen	July 2025
Assistant coach	(Montenegro) Bojana Popović	September 2025
Team manager	(Denmark) Tina Bøttzau	March 2024
Goalkeeping coach	(Denmark) Michael Bruun	Unknown
Physiotherapist	(Denmark) Mikkel Hjuler	February 2016
Video man	(Denmark) Sten Kaj Larsen	March 2020
Body SDS	(Denmark) Erling Andersen	Unknown

=== Coaches ===
List of coaches for Denmark women's national handball team

Years	Name
1946–1958	Knud Knudsen
1959–1963	Jørgen Absalonsen
1963–1965	Else Birkmose
1965–1968	Knud Knudsen
1969–1976	Hans Erik Nielsen
1976–1980	Allan Lund
1980–1981	Jørgen Andersson
1982–1985	Flemming Skovsen
1986–1990	Ole Eliasen
1991–1998	Ulrik Wilbek
1998–2006	Jan Pytlick
2006–2007	Brian Lyngholm
2007–2014	Jan Pytlick
2014–2015	Heine Eriksen
2015–2020	Klavs Bruun Jørgensen
2020–2025	Jesper Jensen
2025–	Helle Thomsen

=== Individual records ===
Still active national team players are highlighted

==== Most matches played ====
Total number of matches played in official competitions only.

#	Player	Matches	Goals
1	Janne Kolling	250	756
2	Karin Mortensen	233	4
3	Lene Rantala	230	0
4	Trine Østergaard	224	478
5	Anne Mette Hansen	209	606
6	Sandra Toft	199	2
7	Camilla Andersen	194	846
8	Katrine Fruelund	184	570
9	Anette Hoffmann	183	641
9	Louise Burgaard	183	379

Last updated: 25 October 2026

==== Most goals scored ====
Total number of goals scored in official matches only.

#	Player	Goals	Matches	Average
1	Camilla Andersen	846	194	4.36
2	Janne Kolling	756	250	3.02
3	Anja Andersen	725	133	5.45
4	Anette Hoffmann	641	183	3.50
5	Anne Mette Hansen	606	209	2.90
6	Katrine Fruelund	570	184	3.10
7	Ann Grete Nørgaard	549	139	3.95
8	Mette Vestergaard Larsen	519	181	2.87
9	Stine Jørgensen	493	149	3.31
10	Kristina Jørgensen	482	157	3.07

Last updated: 25 October 2026
