= Intersport =

International sporting goods retailer

INTERSPORT International Corporation
- Type: Limited
- Industry: Retail
- Founded: 1968
- Headquarters: Bern, Switzerland
- Number of locations: 5,260
- Key people: Tom Foley (CEO)
- Products: Clothing; Sportswear; Footwear; Accessories
- Revenue: €14.1 billion (2025)
- Website: intersport.com

Intersport International Corporation ("IIC"), styled INTERSPORT, is a Swiss sporting goods brand retailer with its headquarters based in Bern, Switzerland.

IIC is the purchasing and brand management company of the Intersport group and is considered one of the largest sporting goods retailers in the world.

Intersport has 5,260 specialist stores in 40 countries around the world.

== History ==
The French buying group originated in 1924 when the Scouts de France association founded La Hutte to distribute scouting equipment and uniforms.

Founded in 1968 in Bern, Switzerland, Intersport grew out of the alliance of ten national purchasing centers to create an international organization around the sporting goods. The founding members were Belgium, Denmark, Germany, France, Italy, the Netherlands, Norway, Austria, Sweden, and Switzerland.

During the 1980s, the group expanded its activities beyond collective purchasing and began developing private-label product brands as part of its long-term growth strategy. In 1984 Intersport launched McKinley, one of its largest private-label brands. Later the brand became a core part of the company’s international offering.

Since its foundation, Intersport has been the official sports retailer at several Olympic Games and has sponsored major sporting events all over the world.

In January 2026, it was announced that Intersport Austria acquired the Intersport Slovenia Group, responsible for retail operations in Central and Southeast European region. The acquisition, which is subject to regulatory approval, brought more than 500 stores in twelve countries under Intersport Austria GmbH, with local management teams remaining in place.

== Brands ==
In addition to offering major sporting brands products, Intersport also owns several PLBs, such as PRO TOUCH (running & ball sports), FIREFLY (water & urban sports), NAKAMURA (biking), McKINLEY(outdoor) and energetics (fitness & training).
