= Russia women's national handball team =

Women's national handball team representing Russia

Russia

Information
- Association: Handball Federation of Russia
- Coach: Lyudmila Bodniyeva
- Assistant coach: Tomáš Hlavatý; Mikhail Izmailov
- Captain: Olga Fomina
- Most caps: Lyudmila Postnova (212)
- Most goals: Lyudmila Postnova (722)

Colours
1st	2nd

Results

Summer Olympics
- Appearances: 3 (First in 2008)
- Best result: 1st (2016)

World Championship
- Appearances: 14 (First in 1993)
- Best result: 1st (2001, 2005, 2007, 2009)

European Championship
- Appearances: 14 (First in 1994)
- Best result: 2nd (2006, 2018)
- Last updated on Unknown.

Russia women's national handball team
Medal record

Olympic Games
Gold medal – first place	2016 Rio de Janeiro	Team
Silver medal – second place	2008 Beijing	Team
Silver medal – second place	2020 Tokyo	Team

World Championship
Gold medal – first place	2001 Italy	
Gold medal – first place	2005 Russia	
Gold medal – first place	2007 France	
Gold medal – first place	2009 China	
Bronze medal – third place	2019 Japan	

European Championship
Silver medal – second place	2006 Sweden	
Silver medal – second place	2018 France	
Bronze medal – third place	2000 Romania	
Bronze medal – third place	2008 Macedonia	

The Russia women's national handball team is the national team of the Russian Federation. It is governed by the Handball Federation of Russia and takes part in international handball competitions.

They are as of October 2021, together with its predecessor the USSR team, the only handball women's team in the world, to have won the World Championship three consecutive times. (Denmarks men's team equalled the record in 2023). Overall, the team won three medals at the Olympics, with a gold on 2016, five medals at the World Championships, with four of them gold, and four medals at the European Championships, with two silvers in 2006 and 2018.

In reaction to the 2022 Russian invasion of Ukraine, the International Handball Federation banned Russian and Belarusian athletes and officials, and the European Handball Federation suspended the national teams of Russia and Belarus, as well as Russian and Belarusian clubs competing in European handball competitions. Referees, officials, and commission members from Russia and Belarus will not be called upon for future activities, and new organisers will be sought for the YAC 16 EHF Beach Handball EURO and the Qualifier Tournaments for the Beach Handball EURO 2023, which were to be held in Moscow.

== History ==
=== 1993–1999: Instability ===
The Russian women's national handball team was formed in 1993, succeeding the Soviet Union women's national handball team, one of the strongest teams in the world. Notwithstanding the third place at the 1992 Summer Olympics as the Unified Team, Russia could not qualify for the Olympic Games in the following eight years.

In this period the Russian team saw four changes of coaches, who retired after failing on large events. The only striking performance was at the 1997 World Women's Handball Championship, where Russia under Igor Eskov, coach of the Rostov club Istochnik, became 4th, and two Russian handball players, Natalya Malakhova and Natalya Deryugina, were included into the All-Star team. However, already in the next year at the 1998 European Women's Handball Championship in the Netherlands, Russia became only 9th, and at the 1999 World Women's Handball Championship, under Kuban's Alexander Tarasikov and head coach of the Unified Team at the 1992 Olympics, just 12th.

=== 1999–2009: Breakthrough ===
In late 1999, Tarasikov was replaced by Evgeny Trefilov, the club coach of Lada. He introduced younger players to the national team and concentrated more on national club players. At the 2000 European Championship, Russia became bronze medalists.

At the 2001 World Championship, Trefilov returned two veterans, Raisa Verakso, which was her sixth participation at Worlds, and the 1990 World champion, goalkeeper Svetlana Bogdanova. Russia won all nine matches, and in the final defeated Norway.

Against the backgrounds of those victories, Team Russia became 4th at the 2002 European Championship in Denmark, and a year later at the World Championship in Croatia they became only 7th, which meant that Trefilov's team could not qualify for the 2004 Olympic Games. Only one point was needed to reach the semi-finals in Croatia, but Russia failed to do that against France in the group stage, losing 19–20; a draw would have been enough to qualify.

After the fourth-best result at the 2004 European Championship in Hungary, Team Russia rose from the ashes at the 2005 World Championship in Saint Petersburg, repeating the 2001 success in Italy.

Russia lost in the final of the 2006 European Championship to Norway, and so could not directly qualify for the Olympics; however, Russia rematched Norway at the 2007 World Championship in France in the final. A number of top handball players such as Lyudmila Bodnieva, MVP of the previous World championships and member of the All-Star Team at the 2000 and 2006 European championships, Irina Bliznova, who was injured in the group stage, Natalya Shipilova, who could not compete in the semi-finals. Goal keeper Inna Suslina made a great game, saving three out of five penalties. Russia won 29–24.

Norway returned the favour at the 2008 Olympics in the gold medal game. Already in the early stage leading ten balls, the Vikings hindered the Russians coming back, and so Russia lost 34–27. Russia won silver.

After the Olympic Games, Anna Kareeva, Oksana Romenskaya and Natalya Shipilova decided to retire from handball. Prior to the 2008 European Championship in Macedonia, players such as Polina Vyakhireva, Yana Uskova, Ekaterina Andryushina, Lyudmila Postnova and Irina Bliznova could not compete for Russia due to injuries or disease; they were replaced by nine debutants. Russia again met Norway in the semi-finals, and as previously, the Scandinavians started well, leading 7–1 in the beginning. In the third-place match between Germany, Russia claimed bronze.

The Russians defeated the Norwegians in the semi-final of the 2009 World Championship with a score of 28–20. In the final, Russia claimed the gold medal by defeating France, 25–22.

=== 2009–2013: Decline and Retirement of Trefilov ===
After the 2009 World Championships, team Russia saw a number of disappointing results. They became 7th at the 2010 European Championship and 6th at the 2011 World Championship. Russia could not get beyond the quarterfinal of the 2012 Olympics, losing there to South Korea. After the London Olympics, the new head coach became Vitaly Krokhin.

In June 2013, Russia fought for the qualification to the World Championship. In the playoff round, Russia won the first leg in Rotterdam, 27–26, but lost the next leg in Rostov-on-Don, 21–33. With that said, Russia for the first time did not qualify for the Worlds.

=== 2013–19: Trefilov's Return and Olympic Gold ===
On 16 September 2013, Evgeny Trefilov returned as head coach. He debuted at the 2014 European Championship, but Russia became a dreadful 14th, the worst ever result in the European championships. However, on 7 and 13 June 2015, Russia twice defeated Germany in the playoffs and qualified for the 2015 World Championship. In their first match they defeated the Norwegians, 26–25. However, the Russians only reached the quarterfinals, losing there to Poland. In the playoffs, team Russia was placed 5th.

Russia qualified to the Olympics for the third time, through the qualification tournament taking place from 18 to 20 March 2016 in Astrakhan. In the group stage of the Olympic tournament, Russia defeated all of its rivals. In the knockout stage, the Russians defeated Angola in the quarterfinal, and in the marathon semi-final match between Norway claimed the deciding point in overtime. In the final, Russia defeated France to claim its first Olympic gold in women's handball.

At the 2018 European Championships, the last time under the guidance of Trefilov, Russia broke through the final for the first time since 2006. Russia lost to host France, who took its first championship title.

=== 2019–20: Ambros Martin as new head coach ===
In August 2019, national team's head coach Trefliov was replaced by Rostov-Don's Ambros Martin. Trefilov took the post as vice-president of the Handball Federation of Russia. Team Russia entered the 2019 World Championships as the main favourite. The squad, primarily including 20 players, was reduced to 18 players; injured Antonina Skorobogatchenko and alternate Olga Shcherbak were dismissed. The Russian team, after winning eight matches in a row was eventually defeated by the Dutch in the semi-finals by a one-point difference, which happened after a last-minute shot in the second half, leaving a final result of 32–33 for Russia against the Netherlands. Russia went on to win the bronze match against Norway, 33–28; this was the first time since 2009 that the Russians won a medal at the Worlds.

Russia went to the 2020 Europeans with less optimism; three injured top players – Elena Mikhaylichenko, Anna Sen and Anna Viakhireva – had to skip the championships; reduced team practice sessions of only one week, for the first time taking place in a sports school hall; missing test matches due to the worldwide situation imposed by the COVID-19 outbreak. Russia started well on the Championships, finishing first in its group in the preliminary round. In the main round, the Russians defeated Montenegro, played a draw match against France and lost against Denmark. As a result, they did not qualify for the semifinals. Martin decided to retire from his position as head coach, expressing his will to focus on family life instead.

=== 2021: Alekseyev replaces Martin ===
After Martin retired in December 2020, Lada's Alexey Alekseyev, who previously served as assistant coach for the national team and was the head coach of Luch, replaced the Spaniard. Furthermore, the coaching staff was renewed, now featuring former handball player Olga Akopyan and Rostov-Don's assistant coach Tomáš Hlavatý. Also, Trefilov took the position as consultant. Prior to the Tokyo's 2020 Summer Olympics, which were postponed to July–August 2021 due to the COVID-19 pandemic, team Russia went through the Hungarian leg of the qualification tournament, which took place Győr. Two of four participating teams were granted a ticket to the upcoming Olympics. Russia won all three matches against Serbia, Kazakhstan and Hungary.

The squad for the Olympics was announced on 2 June. Prior to the Olympics, on 26 June Russia played a friendly match against the Netherlands in Japan. A week later they played another friendly match, losing a second time to the Dutch team. Goalkeeper Anastasia Lagina and outside left Daria Samokhina were named alternates. The team lost its opening Olympic match to Sweden, then drew Hungary, and after that went on a five-match winning streak all the way to the gold medal game, beating Norway in the semi-finals by one point, just as they did in 2016. And just as in 2016, Russia faced France in the final. This time, the French prevailed, 30–25, but Russia won silver, its third Olympic medal after Soviet collapse.

On 23 September 2021, Lyudmila Bodniyeva was announced as the team's new head coach, after Alekseyev's contract ran out.

=== 2022: Suspension from international competition ===
In reaction to the 2022 Russian invasion of Ukraine, the International Handball Federation banned Russian and Belarusian athletes and officials, and the European Handball Federation suspended the national teams of Russia and Belarus as well as Russian and Belarusian clubs competing in European handball competitions. Referees, officials, and commission members from Russia and Belarus will not be called upon for future activities, and new organisers will be sought for the YAC 16 EHF Beach Handball EURO and the Qualifier Tournaments for the Beach Handball EURO 2023, which were to be held in Moscow.

== Results ==
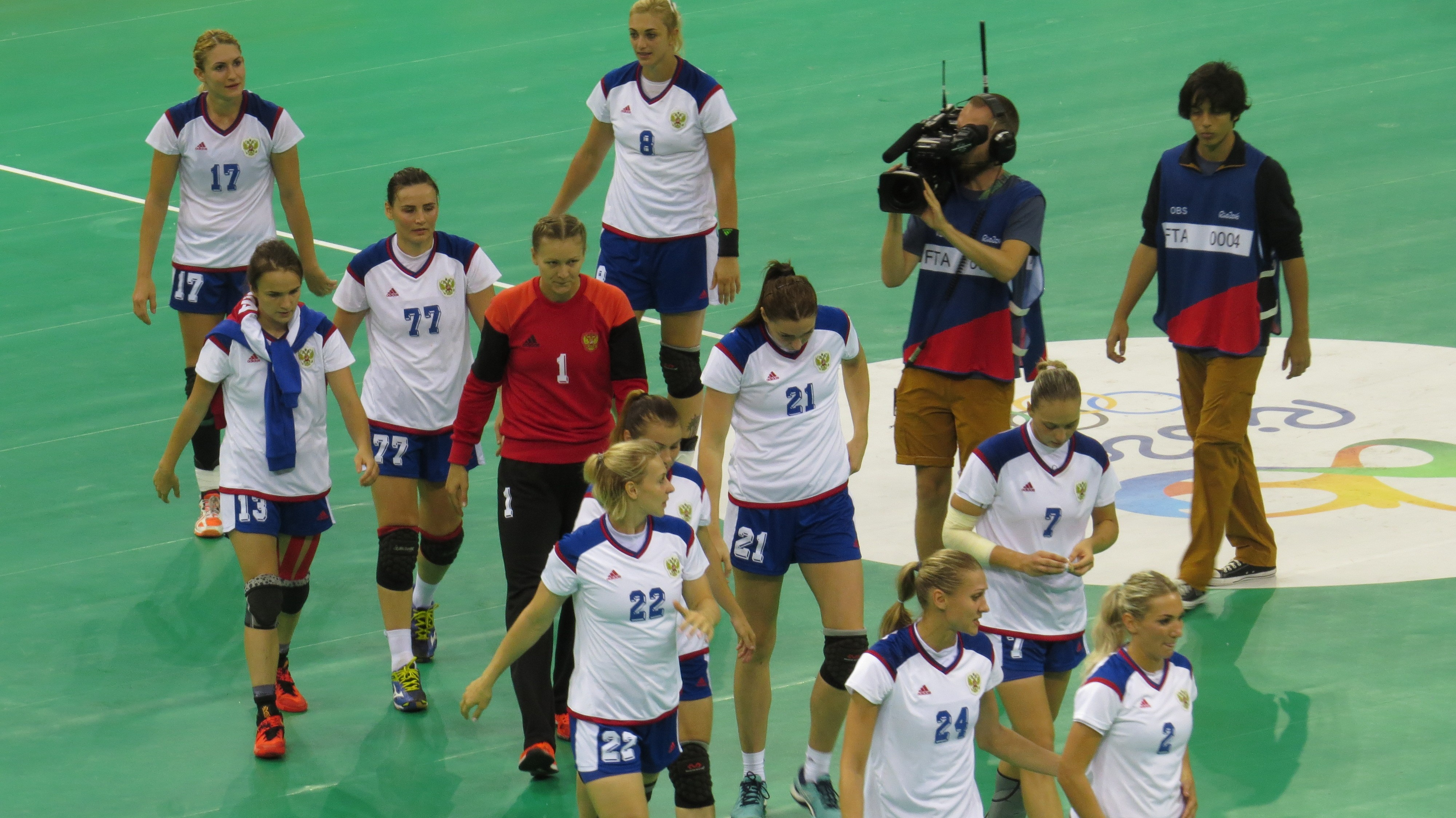
Russia women's national handball team at the 2016 Summer Olympics

=== Honours ===
Competition	1st place, gold medalist(s)	2nd place, silver medalist(s)	3rd place, bronze medalist(s)	Total
Olympic Games	1	2	0	3
World Championship	4	0	1	5
European Championship	0	2	2	4
Total	5	4	3	12

=== Olympic Games ===
Year	Position	Pld	W	D	L	GS	GA	+/-
(United States) 1996	Did not qualify							
(Australia) 2000	Did not qualify							
(Greece) 2004	Did not qualify							
(China) 2008	2nd	8	6	1	1	229	210	+19
(United Kingdom) 2012	8th	6	3	1	2	174	149	+25
(Brazil) 2016	1st	8	8	0	0	256	230	+26
(Japan) 2020	2nd	8	5	1	2	232	226	+6
Total	4/7	30	22	3	5	891	815	+76

=== World Championship ===
Year	Position	Pld	W	D	L	GS	GA	+/–
(Norway) 1993	5th	7	4	1	2	164	147	+17
(Austria) / (Hungary) 1995	6th	8	4	1	3	187	171	+16
(Germany) 1997	4th	9	6	1	2	227	209	+18
(Denmark) / (Norway) 1999	12th	6	3	0	3	178	144	+34
(Italy) 2001	1st	9	9	0	0	252	194	+58
(Croatia) 2003	7th	8	5	1	2	224	182	+42
(Russia) 2005	1st	10	10	0	0	328	239	+89
(France) 2007	1st	9	7	1	1	324	279	+45
(China) 2009	1st	9	6	0	3	253	242	+11
(Brazil) 2011	6th	9	7	0	2	295	210	+85
(Serbia) 2013	Did not qualify							
(Denmark) 2015	5th	9	8	0	1	277	207	+70
(Germany) 2017	5th	7	6	0	1	202	180	+18
(Japan) 2019	3rd	10	9	0	1	311	224	+87
(Spain) 2021	8th	7	4	1	2	211	181	+30
(Denmark) / (Norway) / (Sweden) 2023	Suspended (Note: The EHF suspended Russia after its invasion of Ukraine.)							
(Germany) / (Netherlands) 2025	Suspended							
(Hungary) 2027	Suspended							
(Spain) 2029	To be determined							
(Czech Republic) / (Poland) 2031	To be determined							
Total	14/20	119	92	6	21	3486	2708	+778

=== European Championship ===
Year	Position	Pld	W	D	L	GS	GA	±
(Germany) 1994	6th	6	3	0	3	143	116	+27
(Denmark) 1996	7th	6	3	1	2	164	147	+17
(Netherlands) 1998	9th	6	1	1	4	144	147	−3
(Romania) 2000	3rd	7	5	0	2	163	148	+15
(Denmark) 2002	4th	8	4	1	3	202	189	+13
(Hungary) 2004	4th	8	4	0	4	226	215	+11
(Sweden) 2006	2nd	8	7	0	1	242	200	+42
(North Macedonia) 2008	3rd	8	5	1	2	210	183	+27
(Denmark) (Norway) 2010	7th	6	3	0	3	159	145	+14
(Serbia) 2012	6th	7	2	3	2	190	180	+10
(Croatia) (Hungary) 2014	14th	3	0	1	2	79	83	−4
(Sweden) 2016	7th	6	2	2	2	148	147	+1
(France) 2018	2nd	8	5	0	3	217	206	+11
(Denmark) (Norway) 2020	5th	7	5	1	1	193	178	+15
(Slovenia) (North Macedonia) (Montenegro) 2022	Disqualified during qualification (Note: The EHF suspended Russia after its invasion of Ukraine.)							
(Austria) (Hungary) (Switzerland) 2024	Suspended							
(Czech Republic) (Poland) (Romania) (Slovakia) (Turkey) 2026	Suspended							
(Denmark) (Norway) (Sweden) 2028	TBD							
(Belgium) (France) 2030	TBD							
(Denmark) (Germany) (Poland) 2032	TBD							
Total	14/20	94	49	11	34	2480	2284	+196

=== Other tournaments ===
- Carpathian Trophy 1995 – Second place
- Carpathian Trophy 1997 – Second place
- Carpathian Trophy 2000 – Winner
- Møbelringen Cup 2001 – Winner
- Carpathian Trophy 2002 – Third place
- Møbelringen Cup 2004 – Third place
- Møbelringen Cup 2005 – Second place
- Møbelringen Cup 2006 – Second place
- Møbelringen Cup 2007 – Second place
- Møbelringen Cup 2008 – Second place
- Møbelringen Cup 2009 – Second place
- Møbelringen Cup 2015 – Winner
- Møbelringen Cup 2017 – Second place
- Carpathian Trophy 2018 – Third place

== Team ==
=== Current squad ===
Squad for the 2021 World Women's Handball Championship.

Head coach: Lyudmila Bodniyeva

No.	Pos.	Name	Date of birth (age)	Height	App.	Goals	Club
3	LW	Polina Gorshkova	22 November 1989 (age 36)	1.73 m	34	58	(Russia) CSKA Moscow
11	GK	Anastasia Lagina	11 August 1995 (age 30)	1.78 m	11	2	(Russia) Rostov-Don
23	LB	Elena Mikhaylichenko	14 September 2001 (age 24)	1.80 m	21	28	(Russia) CSKA Moscow
25	RW	Olga Fomina	17 April 1989 (age 37)	1.75 m	151	305	(Russia) HC Lada
31	CB	Karina Sabirova	23 March 1998 (age 28)	1.81 m	27	41	(Russia) CSKA Moscow
33	CB	Ekaterina Ilina	7 March 1991 (age 35)	1.74 m	119	318	(Russia) CSKA Moscow
35	CB	Valeriia Kirdiasheva	28 November 2000 (age 25)	1.77 m	2	5	(Russia) HC Lada
36	RW	Yulia Managarova	27 September 1988 (age 37)	1.67 m	70	220	(Russia) Rostov-Don
39	RB	Antonina Skorobogatchenko	14 February 1999 (age 27)	1.82 m	58	128	(Russia) CSKA Moscow
41	LB	Veronika Nikitina	16 May 1992 (age 34)	1.75 m	13	19	(Russia) HC Lada
51	CB	Milana Tazhenova	6 March 1999 (age 27)	1.82 m	2	1	(Russia) Rostov-Don
55	P	Ksenia Zakordonskaya	4 March 2003 (age 23)	1.74 m	0	0	(Russia) HC Astrakhanochka
67	P	Anastasia Illarionova	28 March 1999 (age 27)	1.80 m	28	16	(Russia) CSKA Moscow
76	RB	Ekaterina Zelenkova	28 February 1999 (age 27)	1.82 m	2	3	(Russia) Rostov-Don
77	CB	Yaroslava Frolova	18 May 1997 (age 29)	1.77 m	41	90	(Russia) Rostov-Don
78	LB	Irina Korneeva	7 June 1995 (age 31)	1.82 m	16	6	(Russia) HC Astrakhanochka
86	CB	Olga Sherbak	14 March 1998 (age 28)	1.77 m	2	5	(Russia) HC Lada
96	LW	Yulia Markova	10 August 1996 (age 29)	1.68 m	20	18	(Russia) CSKA Moscow
99	GK	Polina Kaplina	16 August 1999 (age 26)	1.81 m	7	1	(Russia) CSKA Moscow

=== Notable players ===
Several Russian players have seen their individual performance recognized at international tournaments, either as Most Valuable Player, best defense player or as a member of the All-Star Team.

MVP

- Liudmila Bodnieva, 2005 World Championship
- Liudmila Postnova, 2009 World Championship
- Anna Vyakhireva, 2016 and 2020 Summer Olympics; 2018 European Championship

All-Star Team

- Natalya Deryugina, 1995 and 1997 World Championship
- Natalia Malakhova, 1997 World Championship
- Irina Poltoratskaya, 2001 World Championship
- Liudmila Bodnieva, 2001 and 2005 World Championship; 2002, 2004 and 2006 European Championship
- Inna Suslina, 2006 European Championship; 2009 World Championship
- Yana Uskova, 2007 World Championship
- Liudmila Postnova, 2008 Summer Olympics
- Irina Bliznova, 2008 Summer Olympics
- Polina Kuznetsova, 2007 World Championship; 2012 European Championship; 2016 and 2020 Summer Olympics
- Emiliya Turey, 2011 World Championship
- Daria Dmitrieva, 2016 Summer Olympics
- Anna Vyakhireva, 2019 World Championship; 2020 Summer Olympics

Best defense player

- Nadezda Muravyeva, 2008 European Championship

=== Coaching history ===
Period	Head Coach
–1999	(Russia) Alexander Tarasikov
1999–2012; 2013–2019	(Russia) Evgeny Trefilov
2012–2013	(Russia) Vitaly Krokhin
2019–2020	(Spain) Ambros Martin
2021	(Russia) Alexey Alekseyev
2021–	(Russia) Liudmila Bodnieva

== See also ==
- Russia men's national handball team
- Soviet Union women's national handball team
- Soviet Union men's national handball team
