= Heidi Løke =

Norwegian handball player (born 1982)

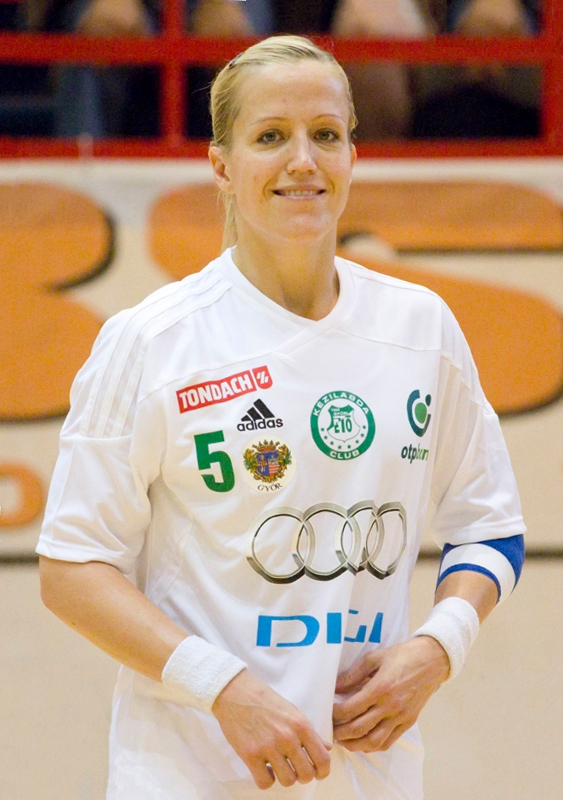
- Løke in 2011

Personal information
- Nationality: Norwegian
- Born: 12 December 1982 (age 43) Tønsberg, Norway
- Height: 1.73 m (5 ft 8 in)

Sport
- Sport: Handball
- Position: Pivot
- Current club: IL Runar

Senior clubs
- Years: Team
- –2000: IL Runar
- 2000–2002: Larvik HK
- 2002–2007: Gjerpen IF
- 2007–2008: Aalborg DH
- 2008–2011: Larvik HK
- 2011–2017: Győri ETO KC
- 2017–2019: Storhamar HE
- 2019–2022: Vipers Kristiansand
- 2022–2025: Larvik HK
National team
Years	Team	Apps	(Gls)
2006–2020	Norway	226	(801)

Teams managed
- 2025–: Poland (assistant)
- 2025–: IL Runar (women)
Medal record
Women's handball
Representing Norway
Olympic Games
Gold medal – first place	2012 London	Team
Bronze medal – third place	2016 Rio de Janeiro	Team
World Championship
Gold medal – first place	2011 Brazil
Gold medal – first place	2015 Denmark
Silver medal – second place	2017 Germany
Bronze medal – third place	2009 China
European Championship
Gold medal – first place	2008 Macedonia
Gold medal – first place	2010 Denmark/Norway
Gold medal – first place	2014 Croatia/Hungary
Gold medal – first place	2020 Denmark
Silver medal – second place	2012 Serbia

Heidi Løke (born 12 December 1982) is a Norwegian handball coach for the women's team at IL Runar. She is also assistant coach for Poland.

As a player she last played for Larvik HK at top level and formerly she made huge success for the Norwegian national team.

Among her achievements as club player are national championships, a silver medal in the EHF Women's Cup Winners' Cup, and winner of the EHF Women's Champions League several times.

== Career ==
=== Club career ===
Løke was born in Tønsberg and grew up in Sandefjord where she started to play handball at the age of ten. She played for Runar, Larvik, Gjerpen and Aalborg DH before she again played for Larvik between 2008 and 2011. She was top scorer in the Norwegian League in the 2008/2009 and 2009/2010 seasons, and was selected Player of the Year in the league both in 2008/2009 and in 2009/2010. Her club won gold medals in both the League and the Cup in 2008/2009, and again in 2009/2010. With Larvik she reached the final in the EHF Women's Cup Winners' Cup in 2008/2009, winning the silver medal. Her club reached the semifinal in the EHF Women's Champions League in 2009/2010.

On 29 November 2010 it was rumored that she would sign with top Hungarian team Győri ETO KC, but Løke refused to comment on the speculations until the forthcoming European Championship were over.

Few weeks later, on 31 December 2010, it was announced that Løke had agreed a two-years contract with Győr and would join her new club after the ongoing season was finished. As Larvik's general manager Bjørn-Gunnar Bruun Hansen revealed, they were in negotiation talks with Løke for a while, but the excellent line player got an offer they simply could not match. Shortly after her signing with Györ, Larvik's head coach Karl Erik Bøhn was dismissed from his job, due to his role in the events.

On 1 March 2012 Løke was given the IHF World Player of the Year award in recognition of her performances throughout 2011 both on club and international level.

=== International career ===
Løke made her debut in the Norwegian national team on 7 April 2006 against Hungary. She participated on the Norwegian team that won gold medals at the 2008 European Women's Handball Championship in Macedonia. She won a bronze medal with the Norwegian team at the 2009 World Women's Handball Championship in Beijing. At the 2010 European Women's Handball Championship she won a gold medal with the Norwegian team, and was selected into the All-Star team as best line player of the tournament. The next year, at the World Championship, she repeated this success, collecting both the gold medal and earning a place in the All-Star team.

== Personal ==
Heidi is not the only professional handballer in the Løke family. Her older brother, Frank Løke was also a former international handballer as well as a player for the Norwegian national team. Her sister, Lise Løke was also a player at top level.

She had a relationship with her former coach Leif Gautestad, with whom she had a son, Alexander, born in 2007. The couple separated in 2010.

Former partner of the now deceased handball coach Karl Erik Bøhn.

Gave birth to her second son, Oscar on 30 June 2017, with Bjørn Vestrum Olsson. She was back in training six days later, and attended her first handball training for her new club Storhamar HE only 25 days after she gave birth.

Her third son, Casper was born on 23 April 2022 from partner Stian Bodin Sundal.

== Achievements ==
- World Championship:
  - Winner: 2011, 2015
  - Silver Medalist: 2017
  - Bronze Medalist: 2009
- European Championship:
  - Winner: 2008, 2010, 2014, 2020
  - Silver Medalist: 2012
- Summer Olympics:
  - Winner: 2012
  - Bronze Medalist: 2016
- EHF Champions League:
  - Winner: 2010/2011, 2012/2013, 2013/2014, 2016/2017, 2020/2021
  - Finalist: 2011/2012, 2015/2016
  - Semifinalist: 2009/2010
- EHF Cup Winners' Cup:
  - Finalist: 2009
  - Semifinalist: 2006
- REMA 1000-ligaen:
  - Winner: 2008/2009 (Larvik), 2009/2010 (Larvik), 2010/2011 (Larvik), 2019/2020 (Vipers), 2020/2021 (Vipers)
  - Silver: 2018/2019 (Storhamar)
  - Bronze: 2024/2025 (Larvik)
- Norwegian Cup:
  - Winner: 2008, 2009, 2010, 2019, 2020
  - Finalist: 2018
- Nemzeti Bajnokság I:
  - Winner: 2012, 2013, 2014, 2016, 2017
- Magyar Kupa:
  - Winner: 2012, 2013, 2014, 2015, 2016

== Awards and recognition ==
- Top Scorer of Eliteserien: 2008/2009 (216 goals), 2009/2010 (204 goals), 2010/2011 (221 goals)
- Best Player of Eliteserien: 2008/2009, 2009/2010, 2010/2011
- All Star Line Player of Eliteserien: 2008/2009, 2009/2010, 2010/2011, 2019/2020, 2020/2021
- EHF Champions League Top Scorer: 2011 (99 goals)
- All-Star Line Player of the European Championship: 2010, 2012, 2014
- All-Star Line Player of the World Championship: 2011, 2015
- IHF World Player of the Year: 2011 (also nominated for 2012)
- All Star Line Player of the Summer Olympics: 2012, 2016
- All-Star Team Best Line Player of the EHF Champions League: 2014/2015; 2015/2016
- Foreign Handballer of the Year in Hungary: 2015
- All-Star Line player of Møbelringen Cup: 2018
- European Handball Federation Hall of Fame in 2023.
