= Norway at the 2020 Summer Olympics =

- IOC code: NOR
- NOC: Norwegian Olympic Committee and Confederation of Sports
- Website: www.idrett.no (in Norwegian)

in Tokyo, Japan July 23, 2021 – August 8, 2021
- Competitors: 93 in 15 sports
- Flag bearers (opening): Anne Vilde Tuxen; Tomoe Zenimoto Hvas
- Flag bearer (closing): Katrine Lunde
- Medals Ranked 20th: Gold 4 Silver 2 Bronze 2 Total 8

Summer Olympics appearances (overview)
- 1900; ~~1904~~; 1908; 1912; 1920; 1924; 1928; 1932; 1936; 1948; 1952; 1956; 1960; 1964; 1968; 1972; 1976; 1980; 1984; 1988; 1992; 1996; 2000; 2004; 2008; 2012; 2016; 2020; 2024; 2028

Other related appearances
- 1906 Intercalated Games

Norway competed at the 2020 Summer Olympics in Tokyo. Originally scheduled to take place from 24 July to 9 August 2020, the Games were postponed to 23 July to 8 August 2021, because of the COVID-19 pandemic. Since the nation's debut in 1900, Norwegian athletes have appeared in every edition of the Summer Olympic Games, except for two occasions: the 1904 Summer Olympics in St. Louis and the 1980 Summer Olympics in Moscow, due to the country's support for the United States-led boycott.

== Medalists ==
Medal	Name	Sport	Event	Date
Gold	Kristian Blummenfelt	Triathlon	Men's individual	26 July
Gold	Karsten Warholm	Athletics	Men's 400 m hurdles	3 August
Gold	Anders Mol; Christian Sørum	Volleyball	Men's beach	7 August
Gold	Jakob Ingebrigtsen	Athletics	Men's 1500 m	7 August
Silver	Kjetil Borch	Rowing	Men's single sculls	30 July
Silver	Eivind Henriksen	Athletics	Men's hammer throw	4 August
Bronze	Hermann Tomasgaard	Sailing	Men's laser	1 August
Bronze	Norway women's national handball team: Henny Reistad; Veronica Kristiansen; Marit Malm Frafjord; Stine Skogrand; Nora Mørk; Stine Bredal Oftedal; Silje Solberg; Kari Brattset Dale; Katrine Lunde; Marit Røsberg Jacobsen; Camilla Herrem; Sanna Solberg-Isaksen; Kristine Breistøl; Marta Tomac; Vilde Johansen	Handball	Women's tournament	8 August

== Competitors ==
The following is the list of number of competitors in the Games. Note that reserves in handball are not counted:

Sport	Men	Women	Total
Athletics	10	5	15
Canoeing	1	0	1
Cycling	6	3	9
Diving	0	1	1
Equestrian	1	0	1
Golf	2	1	3
Gymnastics	1	1	2
Handball	15	15	30
Rowing	7	0	7
Sailing	4	4	8
Shooting	3	2	5
Swimming	3	1	4
Taekwondo	1	0	1
Triathlon	3	1	4
Volleyball	2	0	2
Total	59	34	93

== Athletics ==
Norwegian athletes further achieved the entry standards, either by qualifying time or by world ranking, in the following track and field events (up to a maximum of 3 athletes in each event):

Key

- Note–Ranks given for track events are within the athlete's heat only
- Q = Qualified for the next round
- q = Qualified for the next round as a fastest loser or, in field events, by position without achieving the qualifying target
- NR = National record
- WR= World record
- N/A = Round not applicable for the event
- Bye = Athlete not required to compete in round

Track & road events
Men

Athlete	Event	Heat		Semifinal		Final	
Athlete	Event	Result	Rank	Result	Rank	Result	Rank
Filip Ingebrigtsen	1500 m	3:38.02	10	Did not advance			
Jakob Ingebrigtsen	1500 m	3:36.49	4 Q	3:32.13	2 Q	3:28.32 OR	1st place, gold medalist(s)
Narve Gilje Nordås	5000 m	13:41.82	12	—N/a		Did not advance	
Karsten Warholm	400 m hurdles	48.65	1 Q	47.30	1 Q	45.94 WR	1st place, gold medalist(s)
Sondre Nordstad Moen	Marathon	—N/a				2:17:59	40
Håvard Haukenes	50 km walk	—N/a				DNF	

Women

Athlete	Event	Heat		Semifinal		Final	
Athlete	Event	Result	Rank	Result	Rank	Result	Rank
Hedda Hynne	800 m	2:00.76	3 Q	2:02.38	7	Did not advance	
Karoline Bjerkeli Grøvdal	5000 m	14:56.82	5 Q	—N/a		15:09.37	14
Karoline Bjerkeli Grøvdal	10000 m	—N/a				DNF	
Amalie Iuel	400 m hurdles	55.65	6 q	57.61	8	Did not advance	
Line Kloster	400 m hurdles	56.45	7	Did not advance			

Field events

Athlete	Event	Qualification		Final	
Athlete	Event	Distance	Position	Distance	Position
Sondre Guttormsen	Men's pole vault	5.50	11	Did not advance	
Ola Stunes Isene	Men's discus throw	63.26	3 Q	61.18	12
Eivind Henriksen	Men's hammer throw	78.79 NR	3 Q	81.58 NR	2nd place, silver medalist(s)
Lene Retzius	Women's pole vault	4.25	=14	Did not advance	

Combined events – Men's decathlon

Athlete	Event	100 m	LJ	SP	HJ	400 m	110H	DT	PV	JT	1500 m	Total	Rank
Martin Roe	Result	10.86	7.03	13.98	1.96	50.93	15.47	48.37	4.80	62.28	4:47.58	7863	19
Martin Roe	Points	892	821	727	767	772	794	836	849	772	633	7863	19

== Canoeing ==
=== Sprint ===
Norway qualified a single boat (men's K-1 1000 m) for the Games by winning the silver medal at the 2021 European Canoe Sprint Qualification Regatta in Szeged, Hungary.

Athlete	Event	Heats		Quarterfinals		Semifinals		Final	
Athlete	Event	Time	Rank	Time	Rank	Time	Rank	Time	Rank
Lars Magne Ullvang	Men's K-1 1000 m	3:47.253	3 QF	3:49.830	3	Did not advance			

Qualification Legend: FA = Qualify to final (medal); FB = Qualify to final B (non-medal)

== Cycling ==
=== Road ===
Norway entered a squad of six riders (four men and two women) to compete in their respective Olympic road races, by virtue of their top 50 national finish (for men) and top 22 (for women) in the UCI World Ranking. The full cycling squad was named to the Norwegian roster for the Games on July 1, 2021.

Athlete	Event	Time	Rank
Tobias Foss	Men's road race	6:16:53	61
Markus Hoelgaard	Men's road race	6:15:38	34
Tobias Halland Johannessen	Men's road race	6:25:12	82
Andreas Leknessund	Men's road race	6:25:12	83
Katrine Aalerud	Women's road race	3:59:52	37
Katrine Aalerud	Women's time trial	34:33.38	20
Stine Borgli	Women's road race	Did not finish	

=== Track ===
Following the completion of the 2020 UCI Track Cycling World Championships, Norway entered one rider to compete in the women's omnium based on her final individual UCI Olympic rankings.

Omnium

Athlete	Event	Scratch race		Tempo race		Elimination race		Points race		Total points	Rank
Athlete	Event	Rank	Points	Rank	Points	Rank	Points	Rank	Points	Total points	Rank
Anita Stenberg	Women's omnium	4	34	4	34	8	26	9	3	97	5

=== Mountain biking ===
Norway qualified one mountain biker for the men's Olympic cross-country race, as a result of her nation's eighteenth-place finish in the UCI Olympic Ranking List of 16 May 2021.

Athlete	Event	Time	Rank
Erik Hægstad	Men's cross-country	1:31:14	24

=== BMX ===
Norway received a single quota place for BMX at the Olympics by finishing among the top three nations vying for qualification in the men's race based on the UCI BMX Individual Ranking List of June 1, 2021.

Athlete	Event	Quarterfinal		Semifinal		Final	
Athlete	Event	Points	Rank	Points	Rank	Result	Rank
Tore Navrestad	Men's race	9	3 Q	18	6	Did not advance	

== Diving ==
Anne Vilde Tuxen represents Norway in the Women's 10m platform event. She is the first female Norwegian diver to qualify for the Olympics since 1988.

Athlete	Event	Preliminary		Semifinals		Final	
Athlete	Event	Points	Rank	Points	Rank	Points	Rank
Anne Vilde Tuxen	Women's 10 m platform	219.15	28	Did not advance			

== Equestrian ==
Norway entered two riders into the Olympic equestrian competition by the following results: a top two finish each, outside the group selection, of the individual FEI Olympic Rankings for Group A (North Western Europe) in dressage and jumping, respectively, marking the country's recurrence to the sport after an eight-year absence.

Ellen Birgitte Farbrot and her horse Red Rebel obtained the minimum eligibility requirements to compete in dressage but eventually withdrew, resulting in Norway losing a qualification berth.

=== Jumping ===
Athlete	Horse	Event	Qualification		Final		
Athlete	Horse	Event	Penalties	Rank	Penalties	Time	Rank
Geir Gulliksen	Quatro	Individual	1	=26 Q	Retired		

== Golf ==
Norway entered two male and one female golfers into the Olympic tournament. Marianne Skarpnord qualified but later withdrew.

Athlete	Event	Round 1	Round 2	Round 3	Round 4	Total		
Athlete	Event	Score	Score	Score	Score	Score	Par	Rank
Viktor Hovland	Men's	68	69	71	64	272	−12	=14
Kristian Krogh Johannessen	Men's	72	70	71	71	284	E	=53
Tonje Daffinrud	Women's	81	73	81	74	309	+25	60

== Gymnastics ==
=== Artistic ===
Norway entered two artistic gymnasts into the Olympic competition. Sofus Heggemsnes and Julie Erichsen received a spare berth each from the men's and women's apparatus events, respectively, as one of the highest-ranked, neither part of the team nor qualified directly through the all-around, at the 2019 World Championships in Stuttgart, Germany.

Men

Athlete	Event	Qualification								Final							
Athlete	Event	Apparatus						Total	Rank	Apparatus						Total	Rank
Athlete	Event	F	PH	R	V	PB	HB	Total	Rank	F	PH	R	V	PB	HB	Total	Rank
Sofus Heggemsnes	Pommel horse	—N/a	13.066	—N/a				13.066	44	Did not advance							
Sofus Heggemsnes	Rings	—N/a		13.233	—N/a			13.233	52	Did not advance							
Sofus Heggemsnes	Parallel bars	—N/a				13.133	—N/a	13.133	61	Did not advance							
Sofus Heggemsnes	Horizontal bar	—N/a					12.933	12.933	52	Did not advance							

Women

Athlete	Event	Qualification						Final					
Athlete	Event	Apparatus				Total	Rank	Apparatus				Total	Rank
Athlete	Event	V	UB	BB	F	Total	Rank	V	UB	BB	F	Total	Rank
Julie Erichsen	Uneven bars	—N/a	11.566	—N/a		11.566	75	Did not advance					

== Handball ==
Summary

Key:

- ET: After extra time
- P – Match decided by penalty-shootout.

Team	Event	Group stage						Quarterfinal	Semifinal	Final / BM	
Team	Event	Opposition Score	Opposition Score	Opposition Score	Opposition Score	Opposition Score	Rank	Opposition Score	Opposition Score	Opposition Score	Rank
Norway men's	Men's tournament	Brazil; W 27–24	Spain; L 27–28	Argentina; W 27–23	Germany; L 23–28	France; W 32–29	4 Q	Denmark; L 25–31	Did not advance		7
Norway women's	Women's tournament	South Korea; W 39–27	Angola; W 30–21	Montenegro; W 35–23	Netherlands; W 29–27	Japan; W 37–25	1 Q	Hungary; W 26–22	ROC; L 26–27	Sweden; W 36–19	3rd place, bronze medalist(s)

=== Men's tournament ===
Norway men's national handball team qualified for the Olympics by securing a top-two finish at the Podgorica leg of the 2020 IHF Olympic Qualification Tournament.

Team roster

The squad was announced on 3 July 2021. On 21 July, three days before the tournament started, it was announced that Gøran Johannessen had to leave because of an injury, and he was replaced by Simen Holand Pettersen.

Head coach: Christian Berge

No.	Pos.	Name	Date of birth (age)	Height	App.	Goals	Club
5	CB	Sander Sagosen	14 September 1995 (aged 25)	1.95 m	121	601	(Germany) THW Kiel
8	P	Bjarte Myrhol	29 May 1982 (aged 39)	1.92 m	257	795	Not attached
10	CB	Magnus Fredriksen	24 May 1997 (aged 24)	1.88 m	14	12	(Germany) HSG Wetzlar
11	P	Petter Øverby	26 March 1992 (aged 29)	2.00 m	84	65	(Germany) HC Erlangen
12	GK	Kristian Sæverås	22 June 1996 (aged 25)	1.97 m	30	1	(Germany) SC DHfK Leipzig
15	RB	Kent Robin Tønnesen	5 June 1991 (aged 30)	1.95 m	114	297	(Hungary) MOL-Pick Szeged
17	LW	Magnus Jøndal	7 February 1988 (aged 33)	1.81 m	171	552	Not attached
19	RW	Kristian Bjørnsen	10 January 1989 (aged 32)	1.92 m	141	554	(Denmark) Aalborg Håndbold
21	P	Magnus Gullerud	13 November 1991 (aged 29)	1.93 m	138	174	(Germany) SC Magdeburg
24	CB	Christian O'Sullivan	22 August 1991 (aged 29)	1.90 m	137	218	(Germany) SC Magdeburg
26	LB	Simen Holand Pettersen	8 April 1998 (aged 23)	1.92 m	6	5	(Norway) Elverum Håndball
27	RB	Harald Reinkind	17 August 1992 (aged 28)	1.96 m	121	246	(Germany) THW Kiel
30	GK	Torbjørn Bergerud	16 July 1994 (aged 27)	2.00 m	99	0	(Denmark) GOG Håndbold
44	RW	Kevin Gulliksen	9 November 1996 (aged 24)	1.80 m	49	81	(Germany) Frisch Auf Göppingen
77	RB	Magnus Abelvik Rød	7 July 1997 (aged 24)	2.03 m	59	118	(Germany) SG Flensburg-Handewitt

Group play

Pos	Team	Pld	W	D	L	GF	GA	GD	Pts	Qualification
1	France	5	4	0	1	162	148	+14	8 (Note: France 36–31 Spain)	Quarter-finals
2	Spain	5	4	0	1	155	142	+13	8	Quarter-finals
3	Germany	5	3	0	2	146	131	+15	6 (Note: Germany 28–23 Norway)	Quarter-finals
4	Norway	5	3	0	2	136	132	+4	6	Quarter-finals
5	Brazil	5	1	0	4	128	145	−17	2	
6	Argentina	5	0	0	5	125	154	−29	0	

Source: Tokyo 2020 and IHF
Rules for classification: 1) Points; 2) Head-to-head points; 3) Head-to-head goal difference; 4) Head-to-head goals scored; 5) Goal difference; 6) Goals scored; 7) Draw.
Notes:

24 July 2021; 09:00	Norway	27–24	Brazil	Yoyogi National Gymnasium, Tokyo; Referees: Horáček, Novotný (CZE)
24 July 2021; 09:00	Sagosen 8	(12–13)	Langaro 5	Yoyogi National Gymnasium, Tokyo; Referees: Horáček, Novotný (CZE)
24 July 2021; 09:00		Report	1× (yellow card) 6× (suspension) 1× (red card)	Yoyogi National Gymnasium, Tokyo; Referees: Horáček, Novotný (CZE)

26 July 2021; 16:15	Spain	28–27	Norway	Yoyogi National Gymnasium, Tokyo; Referees: Nikolov, Nachevski (MKD)
26 July 2021; 16:15	Figueras 10	(13–14)	Jøndal 9	Yoyogi National Gymnasium, Tokyo; Referees: Nikolov, Nachevski (MKD)
26 July 2021; 16:15	1× (yellow card) 5× (suspension)	Report	2× (yellow card) 2× (suspension)	Yoyogi National Gymnasium, Tokyo; Referees: Nikolov, Nachevski (MKD)

28 July 2021; 16:15	Norway	27–23	Argentina	Yoyogi National Gymnasium, Tokyo; Referees: Fonseca, Santos (POR)
28 July 2021; 16:15	Sagosen 7	(13–12)	Pizarro, D. Simonet 5	Yoyogi National Gymnasium, Tokyo; Referees: Fonseca, Santos (POR)
28 July 2021; 16:15	2× (yellow card) 4× (suspension)	Report	2× (yellow card) 7× (suspension)	Yoyogi National Gymnasium, Tokyo; Referees: Fonseca, Santos (POR)

30 July 2021; 21:30	Germany	28–23	Norway	Yoyogi National Gymnasium, Tokyo; Referees: Brunner, Salah (SUI)
30 July 2021; 21:30	Gensheimer 6	(14–11)	Sagosen 7	Yoyogi National Gymnasium, Tokyo; Referees: Brunner, Salah (SUI)
30 July 2021; 21:30	2× (yellow card) 3× (suspension)	Report	1× (yellow card) 6× (suspension) 1× (red card)	Yoyogi National Gymnasium, Tokyo; Referees: Brunner, Salah (SUI)

1 August 2021; 16:15	Norway	32–29	France	Yoyogi National Gymnasium, Tokyo; Referees: Nachevski, Nikolov (MKD)
1 August 2021; 16:15	Sagosen 7	(15–15)	Descat, N. Karabatić 5	Yoyogi National Gymnasium, Tokyo; Referees: Nachevski, Nikolov (MKD)
1 August 2021; 16:15	1× (yellow card) 1× (suspension)	Report	1× (yellow card) 3× (suspension)	Yoyogi National Gymnasium, Tokyo; Referees: Nachevski, Nikolov (MKD)

Quarterfinal

3 August 2021; 17:00	Denmark	31–25	Norway	Yoyogi National Gymnasium, Tokyo; Referees: Bonaventura, Bonaventura (FRA)
3 August 2021; 17:00	M. Hansen, Holm 8	(13–12)	Sagosen 8	Yoyogi National Gymnasium, Tokyo; Referees: Bonaventura, Bonaventura (FRA)
3 August 2021; 17:00	1× (yellow card) 4× (suspension)	Report	1× (yellow card) 3× (suspension) 1× (red card)	Yoyogi National Gymnasium, Tokyo; Referees: Bonaventura, Bonaventura (FRA)

=== Women's tournament ===
Norway women's national handball team qualified for the Olympics by securing a top-two finish at the Podgorica leg of the 2020 IHF Olympic Qualification Tournament.

Team roster

The squad was announced on 3 July 2021.

Head coach: (Iceland) Thorir Hergeirsson

No.	Pos.	Name	Date of birth (age)	Height	App.	Goals	Club
2	CB	Henny Reistad	9 February 1999 (aged 22)	1.81 m	29	87	(Denmark) Team Esbjerg
4	LB	Veronica Kristiansen	10 July 1990 (aged 31)	1.75 m	145	475	(Hungary) Győri Audi ETO KC
5	P	Marit Malm Frafjord	25 November 1985 (aged 35)	1.82 m	214	411	(Denmark) Team Esbjerg
7	RB	Stine Skogrand	3 March 1993 (aged 28)	1.73 m	99	172	(Denmark) Herning-Ikast Håndbold
9	RB	Nora Mørk	5 April 1991 (aged 30)	1.67 m	133	644	(Norway) Vipers Kristiansand
10	CB	Stine Bredal Oftedal	25 September 1991 (aged 29)	1.68 m	204	558	(Hungary) Győri Audi ETO KC
12	GK	Silje Solberg	16 June 1990 (aged 31)	1.78 m	156	2	(Hungary) Győri Audi ETO KC
13	P	Kari Brattset Dale	15 February 1991 (aged 30)	1.83 m	80	188	(Hungary) Győri Audi ETO KC
16	GK	Katrine Lunde	30 March 1980 (aged 41)	1.80 m	308	3	(Norway) Vipers Kristiansand
20	RW	Marit Røsberg Jacobsen	25 February 1994 (aged 27)	1.65 m	74	130	(Denmark) Team Esbjerg
23	LW	Camilla Herrem	8 October 1986 (aged 34)	1.67 m	264	737	(Norway) Sola HK
24	LW	Sanna Solberg-Isaksen	16 June 1990 (aged 31)	1.78 m	161	288	(Denmark) Team Esbjerg
25	LB	Kristine Breistøl	23 August 1993 (aged 27)	1.92 m	19	12	(Denmark) Team Esbjerg
26	CB	Marta Tomac	20 September 1990 (aged 30)	1.79 m	78	73	(Norway) Vipers Kristiansand
34	P	Vilde Johansen	25 July 1994 (aged 27)	1.82 m	9	0	(Denmark) Herning-Ikast Håndbold

Group play

Pos	Team	Pld	W	D	L	GF	GA	GD	Pts	Qualification
1	Norway	5	5	0	0	170	123	+47	10	Quarter-finals
2	Netherlands	5	4	0	1	169	143	+26	8	Quarter-finals
3	Montenegro	5	2	0	3	139	142	−3	4	Quarter-finals
4	South Korea	5	1	1	3	147	165	−18	3 (Note: South Korea 31–31 Angola)	Quarter-finals
5	Angola	5	1	1	3	130	156	−26	3	
6	Japan (H)	5	1	0	4	124	150	−26	2	

Source: Tokyo 2020 and IHF
Rules for classification: 1) Points; 2) Head-to-head points; 3) Head-to-head goal difference; 4) Head-to-head goals scored; 5) Goal difference; 6) Goals scored; 7) Draw.
(H) Hosts
Notes:

25 July 2021; 16:15	Norway	39–27	South Korea	Yoyogi National Gymnasium, Tokyo; Referees: Bonaventura, Bonaventura (FRA)
25 July 2021; 16:15	Brattset Dale 11	(18–10)	Sim 5	Yoyogi National Gymnasium, Tokyo; Referees: Bonaventura, Bonaventura (FRA)
25 July 2021; 16:15	5× (suspension)	Report	1× (yellow card) 2× (suspension)	Yoyogi National Gymnasium, Tokyo; Referees: Bonaventura, Bonaventura (FRA)

27 July 2021; 19:30	Angola	21–30	Norway	Yoyogi National Gymnasium, Tokyo; Referees: García, Paolantoni (ARG)
27 July 2021; 19:30	Guialo, Kassoma 6	(10–15)	Solberg-Isaksen 7	Yoyogi National Gymnasium, Tokyo; Referees: García, Paolantoni (ARG)
27 July 2021; 19:30	4× (suspension)	Report	2× (yellow card) 3× (suspension)	Yoyogi National Gymnasium, Tokyo; Referees: García, Paolantoni (ARG)

29 July 2021; 16:15	Montenegro	23–35	Norway	Yoyogi National Gymnasium, Tokyo; Referees: Bonaventura, Bonaventura (FRA)
29 July 2021; 16:15	Radičević 6	(13–13)	Mørk, Reistad 7	Yoyogi National Gymnasium, Tokyo; Referees: Bonaventura, Bonaventura (FRA)
29 July 2021; 16:15	2× (yellow card) 3× (suspension)	Report	3× (suspension)	Yoyogi National Gymnasium, Tokyo; Referees: Bonaventura, Bonaventura (FRA)

31 July 2021; 21:30	Norway	29–27	Netherlands	Yoyogi National Gymnasium, Tokyo; Referees: Alpaidze, Berezkina (RUS)
31 July 2021; 21:30	Mørk 9	(16–13)	Smits 7	Yoyogi National Gymnasium, Tokyo; Referees: Alpaidze, Berezkina (RUS)
31 July 2021; 21:30	2× (suspension)	Report	3× (suspension)	Yoyogi National Gymnasium, Tokyo; Referees: Alpaidze, Berezkina (RUS)

2 August 2021; 21:30	Norway	37–25	Japan	Yoyogi National Gymnasium, Tokyo; Referees: El-Saied, El-Saied (EGY)
2 August 2021; 21:30	Frafjord 6	(16–11)	Ohyama, Yokoshima 5	Yoyogi National Gymnasium, Tokyo; Referees: El-Saied, El-Saied (EGY)
2 August 2021; 21:30	3× (suspension)	Report	2× (yellow card) 1× (suspension)	Yoyogi National Gymnasium, Tokyo; Referees: El-Saied, El-Saied (EGY)

Quarterfinal

4 August 2021; 13:15	Norway	26–22	Hungary	Yoyogi National Gymnasium, Tokyo; Referees: Bonaventura, Bonaventura (FRA)
4 August 2021; 13:15	Brattset Dale 7	(12–10)	Szöllősi-Zácsik 5	Yoyogi National Gymnasium, Tokyo; Referees: Bonaventura, Bonaventura (FRA)
4 August 2021; 13:15		Report	2× (suspension)	Yoyogi National Gymnasium, Tokyo; Referees: Bonaventura, Bonaventura (FRA)

Semifinal

6 August 2021; 21:00	Norway	26–27	ROC	Yoyogi National Gymnasium, Tokyo; Referees: Bonaventura, Bonaventura (FRA)
6 August 2021; 21:00	Mørk 10	(11–14)	Vyakhireva 9	Yoyogi National Gymnasium, Tokyo; Referees: Bonaventura, Bonaventura (FRA)
6 August 2021; 21:00	1× (yellow card) 4× (suspension)	Report	1× (yellow card) 3× (suspension) 1× (red card)	Yoyogi National Gymnasium, Tokyo; Referees: Bonaventura, Bonaventura (FRA)

Bronze medal game

8 August 2021; 11:00	Norway	36–19	Sweden	Yoyogi National Gymnasium, Tokyo; Referees: Alpaidze, Berezkina (RUS)
8 August 2021; 11:00	Brattset Dale, Mørk 8	(19–7)	Carlson, Westberg 4	Yoyogi National Gymnasium, Tokyo; Referees: Alpaidze, Berezkina (RUS)
8 August 2021; 11:00	1× (yellow card) 3× (suspension)	Report	3× (suspension)	Yoyogi National Gymnasium, Tokyo; Referees: Alpaidze, Berezkina (RUS)

== Rowing ==
Norway qualified three boats for each of the following rowing classes into the Olympic regatta, with the majority of crews confirming Olympic places for their boats at the 2019 FISA World Championships in Ottensheim, Austria.

Athlete	Event	Heats		Repechage		Quarterfinals		Semifinals		Final	
Athlete	Event	Time	Rank	Time	Rank	Time	Rank	Time	Rank	Time	Rank
Kjetil Borch	Men's single sculls	6:54.46	1 QF	Bye		7:10.97	1 SA/B	6:42.92	1 FA	6:41.66	2nd place, silver medalist(s)
Kristoffer Brun; Are Strandli	Men's lightweight double sculls	6:25.74	1 SA/B	Bye		—N/a		12:16.25	6 FB	DNS	12
Martin Helseth; Oscar Stabe Helvig; Erik Solbakken; Olaf Tufte	Men's quadruple sculls	5:49.02	4 R	6:02.85	4 FB	—N/a				5:47.34	9

Qualification Legend: FA=Final A (medal); FB=Final B (non-medal); FC=Final C (non-medal); FD=Final D (non-medal); FE=Final E (non-medal); FF=Final F (non-medal); SA/B=Semifinals A/B; SC/D=Semifinals C/D; SE/F=Semifinals E/F; QF=Quarterfinals; R=Repechage

== Sailing ==
Norwegian sailors qualified one boat in each of the following classes through the 2018 Sailing World Championships, the class-associated Worlds, and the continental regattas.

Men

Athlete	Event	Race													Net points	Final rank
Athlete	Event	1	2	3	4	5	6	7	8	9	10	11	12	M*	Net points	Final rank
Endre Funnemark	RS:X	14	16	5	11	11	~~DSQ~~	9	10	3	19	12	16	EL	126	14
Hermann Tomasgaard	Laser	3	18	15	2	6	8	10	5	~~19~~	4	—N/a		14	85	3rd place, bronze medalist(s)
Anders Pedersen	Finn	~~14~~	6	2	10	13	12	5	11	9	4	—N/a		EL	82	11

Women

Athlete	Event	Race													Net points	Final rank
Athlete	Event	1	2	3	4	5	6	7	8	9	10	11	12	M*	Net points	Final rank
Linn Flem Høst	Laser Radial	20	3	1	3	10	~~25~~	12	6	24	22	—N/a		10	111	8
Helene Næss; Marie Rønningen	49erFX	10	17	12	13	10	9	4	9	2	3	~~18~~	7	4	100	7

Mixed

Athlete	Event	Race													Net points	Final rank
Athlete	Event	1	2	3	4	5	6	7	8	9	10	11	12	M*	Net points	Final rank
Nicholas Fadler Martinsen; Martine Steller Mortensen	Nacra 17	14	17	18	~~19~~	19	18	17	15	17	12	19	17	EL	183	19

M = Medal race; EL = Eliminated – did not advance into the medal race

== Shooting ==
Norwegian shooters achieved quota places for the following events by virtue of their best finishes at the 2018 ISSF World Championships, the 2019 ISSF World Cup series, European Championships or Games, and European Qualifying Tournament, as long as they obtained a minimum qualifying score (MQS) by May 31, 2020.

Athlete	Event	Qualification		Semifinal		Final	
Athlete	Event	Points	Rank	Points	Rank	Points	Rank
Jon-Hermann Hegg	Men's 10 m air rifle	625.5	22	—N/a		Did not advance	
Jon-Hermann Hegg	Men's 50 m rifle 3 positions	1181	3 Q	—N/a		438.0	4
Henrik Larsen	Men's 10 m air rifle	627.4	11	—N/a		Did not advance	
Henrik Larsen	Men's 50 m rifle 3 positions	1175	9	—N/a		Did not advance	
Erik Watndal	Men's skeet	121	14	—N/a		Did not advance	
Jeanette Hegg Duestad	Women's 10 m air rifle	632.9 OR	1 Q	—N/a		209.3	4
Jeanette Hegg Duestad	Women's 50 m rifle 3 positions	1171	8 Q	—N/a		439.9	4
Jenny Stene	Women's 10 m air rifle	625.5	19	—N/a		Did not advance	
Jenny Stene	Women's 50 m rifle 3 positions	1168	12	—N/a		Did not advance	
Jeanette Hegg Duestad; Henrik Larsen	10 m air rifle team	626.8	10	Did not advance			
Jenny Stene; Jon-Hermann Hegg	10 m air rifle team	626.8	9	Did not advance			

== Swimming ==
Norwegian swimmers further achieved qualifying standards in the following events (up to a maximum of 2 swimmers in each event at the Olympic Qualifying Time (OQT), and potentially 1 at the Olympic Selection Time (OST)):

Athlete	Event	Heat		Semifinal		Final	
Athlete	Event	Time	Rank	Time	Rank	Time	Rank
Henrik Christiansen	Men's 400 m freestyle	3:48.88	21	—N/a		Did not advance	
Henrik Christiansen	Men's 800 m freestyle	7:48.37	9	—N/a		Did not advance	
Henrik Christiansen	Men's 1500 m freestyle	15:11.14	21	—N/a		Did not advance	
André Grindheim	Men's 100 m breaststroke	1:00.86	35	Did not advance			
Tomoe Zenimoto Hvas	Men's 100 m butterfly	52.22	27	Did not advance			
Tomoe Zenimoto Hvas	Men's 200 m butterfly	1:56.30	19	Did not advance			
Tomoe Zenimoto Hvas	Men's 200 m individual medley	1:57.64	12 Q	2:00.21	16	Did not advance	
Ingeborg Løyning	Women's 100 m backstroke	1:00.07	=18	Did not advance			
Ingeborg Løyning	Women's 200 m backstroke	2:11.68	17	Did not advance			

== Taekwondo ==
Norway entered one athlete into the taekwondo competition at the Games. Richard Ordemann secured a spot in the men's welterweight category (80 kg) with a top two finish at the 2021 European Qualification Tournament in Sofia, Bulgaria.

Athlete	Event	Round of 16	Quarterfinals	Semifinals	Repechage	Final / BM	
Athlete	Event	Opposition Result	Opposition Result	Opposition Result	Opposition Result	Opposition Result	Rank
Richard Ordemann	Men's −80 kg	El-Sharabaty (JOR); L 4–5	Did not advance		Mahboubi (MAR); W 25–10	Eissa (EGY); L 4–12	5

== Triathlon ==
Norway entered four triathletes (three men and one woman) to compete at the Olympics. Rio 2016 Olympian Kristian Blummenfelt, along with rookies Gustav Iden, Casper Stornes, and Lotte Miller, was selected among the top 26 triathletes vying for qualification in their respective events based on the individual ITU World Rankings of 15 June 2021.

Athlete	Event	Time						Rank
Athlete	Event	Swim (1.5 km)	Trans 1	Bike (40 km)	Trans 2	Run (10 km)	Total	Rank
Kristian Blummenfelt	Men's	18:04	0:39	56:19	0:28	29:34	1:45:04	1st place, gold medalist(s)
Gustav Iden	Men's	18:24	0:39	55:59	0:29	30:29	1:46:00	8
Casper Stornes	Men's	17:58	0:42	56:21	0:28	30:50	1:46:19	11
Lotte Miller	Women's	19:58	0:46	64:35	0:35	36:49	2:02:43	24

== Volleyball ==
=== Beach ===
Norway men's beach volleyball pair qualified directly for the Olympics by virtue of their nation's top 15 placement in the FIVB Olympic Rankings of 13 June 2021.

Athlete	Event	Preliminary round				Round of 16	Quarterfinals	Semifinals	Final / BM	
Athlete	Event	Opposition Score	Opposition Score	Opposition Score	Rank	Opposition Score	Opposition Score	Opposition Score	Opposition Score	Rank
Anders Mol; Christian Sørum	Men's	McHugh / Schumann (AUS); W (21–18, 18–21, 15–13)	Gavira / Herrera (ESP); W (21–17, 24–22)	Leshukov / Semenov (ROC); L (19–21, 19–21)	2	Brouwer / Meeuwsen (NED); W (21–17, 21–19)	Leshukov / Semenov (ROC); W (21–17, 21–19)	Pļaviņš / Točs (LAT); W (21–15, 21–16)	Krasilnikov / Stoyanovskiy (ROC); W (21–17, 21–18)	1st place, gold medalist(s)

== See also ==
- Norway at the 2020 Summer Paralympics
