= Handball at the 2020 Summer Olympics =

Handball at the Games of the XXXII Olympiad

Tournament details
- Host country: Japan
- Venue: Yoyogi National Gymnasium
- Dates: 24 July – 8 August 2021
- Teams: 24 (from 5 confederations)

Final positions
- Champions: France (men); France (women)
- Runners-up: Denmark (men); ROC (women)
- Third place: Spain (men); Norway (women)
- Fourth place: Egypt (men); Sweden (women)

The handball tournaments at the 2020 Summer Olympics took place from 24 July to 8 August 2021 at Yoyogi National Gymnasium in Tokyo.

It was originally scheduled to be held in 2020, but on 24 March 2020, the Olympics were postponed to 2021 due to the COVID-19 pandemic. The pandemic meant that there were no spectators. The format was the same as it has been since 2000 for the men and 2008 for the women: 12 teams in two groups playing round robin followed by knock-out matches for the eight best starting with quarter-finals and ending with final and bronze match.

France took both gold medals as the first team since Yugoslavia in Los Angeles 1984. Both finals were a repetition of the last ones: Denmark versus France for the men and Russia/ROC versus France for the women. In 2016 France lost both matches.

Norway got their second bronze in a row for the woman and Spain got the bronze for the men defeating Egypt, who got their best result ever and became best non-European team for the men. South Korea became best non-European team for the women. The host Japan became last for the women and second last for the men surpassing Argentina.

Most valuable players were Anna Vyakhireva (ROC) for the women and Mathias Gidsel (DEN) for the men. Mikkel Hansen (DEN) broke two records for men at the olympics: most goal in a tournament (61) and most goals in olympic handball (154).

== Schedule ==
Legend
G	Group stage	¼	Quarter-finals	½	Semi-finals	B	Bronze medal match	F	Gold medal match

Date Event	Sat 24	Sun 25	Mon 26	Tue 27	Wed 28	Thu 29	Fri 30	Sat 31	Sun 1	Mon 2	Tue 3	Wed 4	Thu 5	Fri 6	Sat 7		Sun 8	
Men	G		G		G		G		G		¼		½		B	F		
Women		G		G		G		G		G		¼		½			B	F

== Events ==
Two sets of medals will be awarded in the following events:

- Men's handball (12 teams)
- Women's handball (12 teams)

== Qualification ==
The National Olympic Committees might enter only one 14-player men's team and only one 14-player women's team.

=== Men's qualification ===
Qualification	Date	Host(s)	Vacancies	Qualified
Host nation	—N/a	—N/a	1	Japan
2019 World Championship	10–27 January 2019	Denmark; Germany	1	Denmark
2019 Pan American Games	31 July – 5 August 2019	(Peru) Lima	1	Argentina
AHF Men’s Asian qualification event	17–26 October 2019	(Qatar) Doha	1	Bahrain
2020 European Championship	10–26 January 2020	Austria; Norway; Sweden	1	Spain
2020 African Championship	16–26 January 2020	Tunisia	1	Egypt
2020 IHF Men's Olympic Qualification Tournaments	12–14 March 2021	(Montenegro) Podgorica	2	Norway; Brazil
2020 IHF Men's Olympic Qualification Tournaments	12–14 March 2021	(France) Montpellier	2	France; Portugal
2020 IHF Men's Olympic Qualification Tournaments	12–14 March 2021	(Germany) Berlin	2	Sweden; Germany
Total			12	

=== Women's qualification ===
Qualification	Date	Host	Vacancies	Qualified
Host nation	—N/a	—N/a	1	Japan
2018 European Championship	29 November – 16 December 2018	France	1	France
2019 Pan American Games	24–30 July 2019	(Peru) Lima	1	Brazil
2019 Asian Qualification Tournament	23–29 September 2019	(China) Chuzhou	1	South Korea
2019 African Qualification Tournament	26–29 September 2019	(Senegal) Dakar	1	Angola
2019 World Championship	29 November – 15 December 2019	Japan	1	Netherlands
2020 IHF Women's Olympic Qualification Tournaments	19–21 March 2021	(Spain) Llíria	2	Spain; Sweden
2020 IHF Women's Olympic Qualification Tournaments	19–21 March 2021	(Hungary) Győr	2	ROC; Hungary
2020 IHF Women's Olympic Qualification Tournaments	19–21 March 2021	(Montenegro) Podgorica	2	Montenegro; Norway
Total			12	

== Medal summary ==
=== Medal table ===
Rank	NOC	Gold	Silver	Bronze	Total
1	France	2	0	0	2
2	Denmark	0	1	0	1
2	ROC	0	1	0	1
4	Norway	0	0	1	1
4	Spain	0	0	1	1
Totals (5 entries)		2	2	2	6

=== Medalists ===
Event	Gold	Silver	Bronze
Men	France; Luc Abalo; Hugo Descat; Ludovic Fabregas; Yann Genty; Vincent Gérard; Michaël Guigou; Luka Karabatic; Nikola Karabatić; Romain Lagarde; Kentin Mahé; Dika Mem; Timothey N'Guessan; Valentin Porte; Nedim Remili; Melvyn Richardson; Nicolas Tournat	Denmark; Lasse Andersson; Mathias Gidsel; Jóhan Hansen; Mikkel Hansen; Jacob Holm; Emil Jakobsen; Niklas Landin Jacobsen; Magnus Landin Jacobsen; Mads Mensah Larsen; Kevin Møller; Henrik Møllgaard; Morten Olsen; Magnus Saugstrup; Lasse Svan; Henrik Toft Hansen	Spain; Julen Aguinagalde; Rodrigo Corrales; Alex Dujshebaev; Raúl Entrerríos; Ángel Fernández; Adrià Figueras; Antonio García Robledo; Aleix Gómez; Gedeón Guardiola; Eduardo Gurbindo; Jorge Maqueda; Viran Morros; Gonzalo Pérez de Vargas; Miguel Sánchez-Migallón; Daniel Sarmiento; Ferran Solé
Women	France; Méline Nocandy; Blandine Dancette; Pauline Coatanea; Chloé Valentini; Allison Pineau; Coralie Lassource; Grâce Zaadi Deuna; Amandine Leynaud; Kalidiatou Niakaté; Cléopatre Darleux; Océane Sercien-Ugolin; Laura Flippes; Béatrice Edwige; Pauletta Foppa; Estelle Nze Minko; Alexandra Lacrabère	ROC; Anna Sedoykina; Polina Kuznetsova; Polina Gorshkova; Daria Dmitrieva; Anna Sen; Anna Vyakhireva; Polina Vedekhina; Vladlena Bobrovnikova; Kseniya Makeyeva; Elena Mikhaylichenko; Olga Fomina; Ekaterina Ilina; Yulia Managarova; Antonina Skorobogatchenko; Victoriya Kalinina	Norway; Henny Reistad; Veronica Kristiansen; Marit Malm Frafjord; Stine Skogrand; Nora Mørk; Stine Bredal Oftedal; Silje Solberg; Kari Brattset Dale; Katrine Lunde; Marit Røsberg Jacobsen; Camilla Herrem; Sanna Solberg-Isaksen; Kristine Breistøl; Marta Tomac; Vilde Johansen

== Men's tournament ==
=== Group stage ===
The teams were divided into two groups of six nations, playing every team in their group once. Two points were awarded for a victory, one for a draw. The top four teams per group qualified for the quarter-finals.

==== Group A ====
Pos	Team	Pld	W	D	L	GF	GA	GD	Pts	Qualification
1	France	5	4	0	1	162	148	+14	8 (Note: France 36–31 Spain)	Quarter-finals
2	Spain	5	4	0	1	155	142	+13	8	Quarter-finals
3	Germany	5	3	0	2	146	131	+15	6 (Note: Germany 28–23 Norway)	Quarter-finals
4	Norway	5	3	0	2	136	132	+4	6	Quarter-finals
5	Brazil	5	1	0	4	128	145	−17	2	
6	Argentina	5	0	0	5	125	154	−29	0	

Source: Tokyo 2020 and IHF
Rules for classification: 1) Points; 2) Head-to-head points; 3) Head-to-head goal difference; 4) Head-to-head goals scored; 5) Goal difference; 6) Goals scored; 7) Draw.

==== Group B ====
Pos	Team	Pld	W	D	L	GF	GA	GD	Pts	Qualification
1	Denmark	5	4	0	1	174	139	+35	8 (Note: Denmark 2 Pts, +2 GD; Egypt 2 Pts, 0 GD, Sweden 2 Pts, −2 GD)	Quarter-finals
2	Egypt	5	4	0	1	154	134	+20	8	Quarter-finals
3	Sweden	5	4	0	1	144	142	+2	8	Quarter-finals
4	Bahrain	5	1	0	4	129	149	−20	2 (Note: Bahrain 2 Pts, +1 GD; Portugal 2 Pts, 0 GD, Japan 2 Pts, −1 GD)	Quarter-finals
5	Portugal	5	1	0	4	143	156	−13	2	
6	Japan (H)	5	1	0	4	146	170	−24	2	

Source: Tokyo 2020 and IHF
Rules for classification: 1) Points; 2) Head-to-head points; 3) Head-to-head goal difference; 4) Head-to-head goals scored; 5) Goal difference; 6) Goals scored; 7) Draw.
(H) Hosts

=== Knockout stage ===
Quarterfinals
3 August
France	42
Bahrain	28
3 August
Germany	26
Egypt	31
3 August
Sweden	33
Spain	34
3 August
Denmark	31
Norway	25

Semifinals
5 August
France	27
Egypt	23
5 August
Spain	23
Denmark	27

Gold medal
7 August
France	25
Denmark	23
Bronze medal
7 August
Spain	33
Egypt	31

=== Final standings ===
Rank	Team
Gold medal	France
Silver medal	Denmark
Bronze medal	Spain
4	Egypt
5	Sweden
6	Germany
7	Norway
8	Bahrain
9	Portugal
10	Brazil
11	Japan
12	Argentina

== Women's tournament ==
=== Group stage ===
The teams were divided into two groups of six nations, playing every team in their group once. Two points were awarded for a victory, one for a draw. The top four teams per group qualified for the quarter-finals.

==== Group A ====
Pos	Team	Pld	W	D	L	GF	GA	GD	Pts	Qualification
1	Norway	5	5	0	0	170	123	+47	10	Quarter-finals
2	Netherlands	5	4	0	1	169	143	+26	8	Quarter-finals
3	Montenegro	5	2	0	3	139	142	−3	4	Quarter-finals
4	South Korea	5	1	1	3	147	165	−18	3 (Note: South Korea 31–31 Angola)	Quarter-finals
5	Angola	5	1	1	3	130	156	−26	3	
6	Japan (H)	5	1	0	4	124	150	−26	2	

Source: Tokyo 2020 and IHF
Rules for classification: 1) Points; 2) Head-to-head points; 3) Head-to-head goal difference; 4) Head-to-head goals scored; 5) Goal difference; 6) Goals scored; 7) Draw.
(H) Hosts

==== Group B ====
Pos	Team	Pld	W	D	L	GF	GA	GD	Pts	Qualification
1	Sweden	5	3	1	1	152	133	+19	7 (Note: Sweden 36–24 ROC)	Quarter-finals
2	ROC	5	3	1	1	148	149	−1	7	Quarter-finals
3	France	5	2	1	2	139	135	+4	5	Quarter-finals
4	Hungary	5	2	0	3	142	149	−7	4 (Note: Hungary 29–25 Spain)	Quarter-finals
5	Spain	5	2	0	3	135	142	−7	4	
6	Brazil	5	1	1	3	133	141	−8	3	

Source: Tokyo 2020 and IHF
Rules for classification: 1) Points; 2) Head-to-head points; 3) Head-to-head goal difference; 4) Head-to-head goals scored; 5) Goal difference; 6) Goals scored; 7) Draw.

=== Knockout stage ===
Quarterfinals
4 August
Norway	26
Hungary	22
4 August
Montenegro	26
ROC	32
4 August
France	32
Netherlands	22
4 August
Sweden	39
South Korea	30

Semifinals
6 August
Norway	26
ROC	27
6 August
France	29
Sweden	27

Gold medal
8 August
ROC	25
France	30
Bronze medal
8 August
Norway	36
Sweden	19

=== Final standings ===
Rank	Team
Gold medal	France
Silver medal	ROC
Bronze medal	Norway
4	Sweden
5	Netherlands
6	Montenegro
7	Hungary
8	South Korea
9	Spain
10	Angola
11	Brazil
12	Japan
