= Handball at the 2020 Summer Olympics – Women's qualification =

The qualification for the 2020 Women's Olympic Handball Tournament assigned quota places to twelve teams: the hosts, the World champion, four continental champions and six teams from the World Olympic qualification tournaments respectively. The 2020 Olympics were postponed to 2021 due to the COVID-19 pandemic.

== Qualification summary ==
Qualification	Date	Host	Vacancies	Qualified
Host nation	—	—	1	Japan
2018 European Championship	29 November – 16 December 2018	France	1	France
2019 Pan American Games	24–30 July 2019	(Peru) Lima	1	Brazil
2019 Asian Qualification Tournament	23–29 September 2019	(China) Chuzhou	1	South Korea
2019 African Qualification Tournament	26–29 September 2019	(Senegal) Dakar	1	Angola
2019 World Championship	29 November – 15 December 2019	Japan	1	Netherlands
2020 IHF Women's Olympic Qualification Tournaments	19–21 March 2021	(Spain) Llíria	2	Spain; Sweden
2020 IHF Women's Olympic Qualification Tournaments	19–21 March 2021	(Hungary) Győr	2	ROC; Hungary
2020 IHF Women's Olympic Qualification Tournaments	19–21 March 2021	(Montenegro) Podgorica	2	Montenegro; Norway
Total			12	

== Legend for qualification type ==
Legend for qualification type
Team qualified from the World Championship directly to the 2020 Olympic Tournament
Team qualified from Continental Events or as hosts directly to the 2020 Olympic Tournament
Team qualified from the World Championship to the Olympic Qualification Tournaments
Team qualified from Continental Events to the Olympic Qualification Tournaments

== Host country ==
- Japan

== World Championship ==
Rank	Team
1st place, gold medalist(s)	Netherlands
2nd place, silver medalist(s)	Spain
3rd place, bronze medalist(s)	ROC
4	Norway
5	Montenegro
6	Serbia
7	Sweden
8	Germany
9	Denmark
10	Japan
11	South Korea
12	Romania
13	France
14	Hungary
15	Angola
16	Argentina
17	Brazil
18	Senegal
19	Slovenia
20	DR Congo
21	Cuba
22	Kazakhstan
23	China
24	Australia

== Continental qualification ==
=== Europe ===
Rank	Team
1st place, gold medalist(s)	France
2nd place, silver medalist(s)	ROC
3rd place, bronze medalist(s)	Netherlands
4	Romania
5	Norway
6	Sweden
7	Hungary
8	Denmark
9	Montenegro
10	Germany
11	Serbia
12	Spain
13	Slovenia
14	Poland
15	Czech Republic
16	Croatia

=== Americas ===
Rank	Team
1st place, gold medalist(s)	Brazil
2nd place, silver medalist(s)	Argentina
3rd place, bronze medalist(s)	Cuba
4	United States
5	Dominican Republic
6	Puerto Rico
7	Canada
8	Peru

=== Asia ===
The tournament was held in Chuzhou, China from 23 to 29 September 2019.

All times are local (UTC+8).

Pos	Team	Pld	W	D	L	GF	GA	GD	Pts	Qualification
1	South Korea	5	5	0	0	181	93	+88	10	2020 Summer Olympics
2	China (H)	5	3	0	2	138	103	+35	6 (Note: China 2 Pts, +4 GD; North Korea 2 Pts, +1 GD, Kazakhstan 2 Pts, −5 GD)	
3	North Korea	5	3	0	2	142	115	+27	6	
4	Kazakhstan	5	3	0	2	133	110	+23	6	Qualification tournaments
5	Hong Kong	5	1	0	4	86	165	−79	2	
6	Thailand	5	0	0	5	86	180	−94	0	

Source: AHF
Rules for classification: 1) points; 2) head-to-head points; 3) head-to-head goal difference; 4) head-to-head number of goals scored; 5) goal difference.
(H) Hosts
Notes:

23 September 2019; 14:00	Kazakhstan	30–16	Hong Kong	Chuzhou Handball Stadium, Chuzhou; Referees: Lee, Lee (KOR)
23 September 2019; 14:00		(16–7)		Chuzhou Handball Stadium, Chuzhou; Referees: Lee, Lee (KOR)

23 September 2019; 16:00	South Korea	39–21	North Korea	Chuzhou Handball Stadium, Chuzhou; Referees: Cheng, Zhou (CHN)
23 September 2019; 16:00		(20–10)		Chuzhou Handball Stadium, Chuzhou; Referees: Cheng, Zhou (CHN)

23 September 2019; 18:00	China	36–17	Thailand	Chuzhou Handball Stadium, Chuzhou; Referees: Ota, Shimajiri (JPN)
23 September 2019; 18:00		(17–9)		Chuzhou Handball Stadium, Chuzhou; Referees: Ota, Shimajiri (JPN)

24 September 2019; 14:00	South Korea	29–25	Kazakhstan	Chuzhou Handball Stadium, Chuzhou; Referees: Alpaidze, Berezkina (RUS)
24 September 2019; 14:00		(15–13)		Chuzhou Handball Stadium, Chuzhou; Referees: Alpaidze, Berezkina (RUS)

24 September 2019; 16:00	Hong Kong	33–22	Thailand	Chuzhou Handball Stadium, Chuzhou; Referees: Ota, Shimajiri (JPN)
24 September 2019; 16:00		(19–10)		Chuzhou Handball Stadium, Chuzhou; Referees: Ota, Shimajiri (JPN)

24 September 2019; 18:00	North Korea	25–22	China	Chuzhou Handball Stadium, Chuzhou; Referees: Al-Watani, Qamber (BHR)
24 September 2019; 18:00		(11–11)		Chuzhou Handball Stadium, Chuzhou; Referees: Al-Watani, Qamber (BHR)

26 September 2019; 14:00	Thailand	14–40	South Korea	Chuzhou Handball Stadium, Chuzhou; Referees: Al-Watani, Qamber (BHR)
26 September 2019; 14:00		(6–21)		Chuzhou Handball Stadium, Chuzhou; Referees: Al-Watani, Qamber (BHR)

26 September 2019; 16:00	Kazakhstan	24–22	North Korea	Chuzhou Handball Stadium, Chuzhou; Referees: Cheng, Zhou (CHN)
26 September 2019; 16:00		(12–10)		Chuzhou Handball Stadium, Chuzhou; Referees: Cheng, Zhou (CHN)

26 September 2019; 18:00	China	34–10	Hong Kong	Chuzhou Handball Stadium, Chuzhou; Referees: Lee, Lee (KOR)
26 September 2019; 18:00		(21–4)		Chuzhou Handball Stadium, Chuzhou; Referees: Lee, Lee (KOR)

27 September 2019; 14:00	North Korea	36–16	Thailand	Chuzhou Handball Stadium, Chuzhou; Referees: Lee, Lee (KOR)
27 September 2019; 14:00		(18–8)		Chuzhou Handball Stadium, Chuzhou; Referees: Lee, Lee (KOR)

27 September 2019; 16:00	Hong Kong	13–41	South Korea	Chuzhou Handball Stadium, Chuzhou; Referees: Al-Watani, Qamber (BHR)
27 September 2019; 16:00		(4–21)		Chuzhou Handball Stadium, Chuzhou; Referees: Al-Watani, Qamber (BHR)

27 September 2019; 18:00	Kazakhstan	19–26	China	Chuzhou Handball Stadium, Chuzhou; Referees: Alpaidze, Berezkina (RUS)
27 September 2019; 18:00		(10–12)		Chuzhou Handball Stadium, Chuzhou; Referees: Alpaidze, Berezkina (RUS)

29 September 2019; 14:00	Thailand	17–35	Kazakhstan	Chuzhou Handball Stadium, Chuzhou; Referees: Ota, Shimajiri (JPN)
29 September 2019; 14:00		(8–16)		Chuzhou Handball Stadium, Chuzhou; Referees: Ota, Shimajiri (JPN)

29 September 2019; 16:00	Hong Kong	14–38	North Korea	Chuzhou Handball Stadium, Chuzhou; Referees: Cheng, Zhou (CHN)
29 September 2019; 16:00		(6–19)		Chuzhou Handball Stadium, Chuzhou; Referees: Cheng, Zhou (CHN)

29 September 2019; 18:00	China	20–32	South Korea	Chuzhou Handball Stadium, Chuzhou; Referees: Alpaidze, Berezkina (RUS)
29 September 2019; 18:00		(8–17)		Chuzhou Handball Stadium, Chuzhou; Referees: Alpaidze, Berezkina (RUS)

=== Africa ===
The tournament was held in Dakar, Senegal from 26 to 29 September 2019.

All times are local (UTC+0).

Pos	Team	Pld	W	D	L	GF	GA	GD	Pts	Qualification
1	Angola	2	2	0	0	51	35	+16	4	2020 Summer Olympics
2	Senegal (H)	2	1	0	1	43	40	+3	2	
3	DR Congo	2	0	0	2	39	58	−19	0	
4	Cameroon	0	0	0	0	0	0	0	0	Withdrew

Rules for classification: 1) points; 2) head-to-head points; 3) head-to-head goal difference; 4) head-to-head number of goals scored; 5) goal difference.
(H) Hosts

26 September 2019; 18:00	Angola	29–21	DR Congo	Dakar Arena, Dakar
26 September 2019; 18:00		(19–12)		Dakar Arena, Dakar

27 September 2019; 18:00	DR Congo	18–29	Senegal	Dakar Arena, Dakar
27 September 2019; 18:00		(8–11)		Dakar Arena, Dakar

29 September 2019; 18:00	Senegal	14–22	Angola	Dakar Arena, Dakar
29 September 2019; 18:00		(6–12)		Dakar Arena, Dakar

== Olympic Qualification Tournaments ==
There were three Olympic Qualification Tournaments. Only twelve teams that have not yet qualified through the five events mentioned above could play in the tournament:

- The top six teams from the 2019 World Championship that did not already qualify through their continental championships are eligible to participate in the tournament.
- The best ranked teams of each continent in the 2019 World Championship represent the continent in order to determine the continental ranking. The first ranked continent received two more places for the tournament. The second, third and fourth ranked continent received one place each. The last place belongs to a team from Oceania, if one was ranked between 8th–12th at the World Championship. If no team from Oceania met this condition, the second ranked continent receives an extra place instead. The teams that already earned their places through their World Championship ranking will not be considered for receiving places through the continental criterion.
- The twelve teams were allocated in three pools of four teams according to the table below. The top two teams from each pool qualified for the 2020 Olympic Games.

2020 Olympic Qualification Tournament #1	2020 Olympic Qualification Tournament #2	2020 Olympic Qualification Tournament #3
2nd from World: Spain; 7th from World: Sweden; ~~2nd from Africa: Senegal~~; 2nd from the Americas: Argentina	3rd from World: Russia; 6th from World: Serbia; ~~2nd from Asia: China~~; 4th from Asia: Kazakhstan; 7th from Europe: Hungary	4th from World: Norway; 5th from World: Montenegro; 4th from Europe: Romania; ~~3rd from Asia: North Korea~~

On 10 January 2020, North Korea withdrew and was replaced by Kazakhstan.

On 3 February 2020, China and Hong Kong withdrew and were replaced by Thailand. In October 2020, China requested to be reinstated because the tournaments were moved and the IHF granted that request. On 1 March 2021, China withdrew from the tournament due to COVID-19 travel restrictions. Because of that, Kazakhstan was moved to Tournament 2 and no other Asian team was available (Hong Kong declined a participation and Thailand did not respond prior to the deadline), meaning that Tournament 3 was played with three teams. Senegal withdrew on 9 March 2021 and was not replaced by another African team.

=== 2020 Olympic Qualification Tournament #1 ===
Pos	Team	Pld	W	D	L	GF	GA	GD	Pts	Qualification
1	Spain (H)	2	1	1	0	59	44	+15	3 (Note: Spain 28–28 Sweden)	2020 Summer Olympics
2	Sweden	2	1	1	0	62	49	+13	3	2020 Summer Olympics
3	Argentina	2	0	0	2	37	65	−28	0	

Source: IHF
Rules for classification: 1) Points; 2) Head-to-head points; 3) Head-to-head goal difference; 4) Head-to-head goals scored; 5) Goal difference; 6) Goals scored; 7) Draw.
(H) Hosts

=== 2020 Olympic Qualification Tournament #2 ===
Pos	Team	Pld	W	D	L	GF	GA	GD	Pts	Qualification
1	Russia	3	3	0	0	91	73	+18	6	2020 Summer Olympics
2	Hungary (H)	3	2	0	1	100	71	+29	4	2020 Summer Olympics
3	Serbia	3	1	0	2	89	90	−1	2	
4	Kazakhstan	3	0	0	3	75	121	−46	0	

Source: IHF
Rules for classification: 1) Points; 2) Head-to-head points; 3) Head-to-head goal difference; 4) Head-to-head goals scored; 5) Goal difference; 6) Goals scored; 7) Draw.
(H) Hosts

=== 2020 Olympic Qualification Tournament #3 ===
Pos	Team	Pld	W	D	L	GF	GA	GD	Pts	Qualification
1	Montenegro (H)	2	1	0	1	53	51	+2	2	2020 Summer Olympics
2	Norway	2	1	0	1	52	52	0	2	2020 Summer Olympics
3	Romania	2	1	0	1	52	54	−2	2	

Source: IHF
Rules for classification: 1) Points; 2) Head-to-head points; 3) Head-to-head goal difference; 4) Head-to-head goals scored; 5) Goal difference; 6) Goals scored; 7) Draw.
(H) Hosts
