= Handball at the 2020 Summer Olympics – Women's tournament =

Women's handball at the XXXII Olympiad

Tournament details
- Host country: Japan
- Venue: Yoyogi National Stadium
- Dates: 25 July – 8 August 2021
- Teams: 12

Final positions
- Champions: France (1st title)
- Runners-up: ROC
- Third place: Norway
- Fourth place: Sweden

Tournament statistics
- Matches played: 38
- Goals scored: 2,176 (57.26 per match)
- Attendance: 0 (0 per match)
- Top scorers: (Norway) Nora Mørk (52 goals)

Awards
- Best player: (Russia) Anna Vyakhireva

The women's handball tournament at the 2020 Summer Olympics was the 12th edition of the handball event for women at the Summer Olympic Games. It was held from 25 July to 8 August 2021. All games were played at the Yoyogi National Stadium in Tokyo, Japan.

It was originally scheduled to be held in 2020, but on 24 March 2020, the Olympics were postponed to 2021 due to the COVID-19 pandemic. Because of this pandemic, the games were played behind closed doors.

The final was a rematch of the previous between France and Russia. After Russia won 22–19 in the 2016 final France got the upper hand with a 30–25 win this time. Norway won the bronze medal after winning 36–19 against Sweden. France became the first nation since 1984 to win both the men's and women's tournaments

The medals for the competition were presented by Kristin Kloster Aasen, Norway; IOC Member, and the medalists' bouquets were presented by Anna Rapp, Sweden; IHF Treasurer.

== Schedule ==
The schedule was as follows.

Legend
G	Group stage	¼	Quarter-finals	½	Semi-finals	B	Bronze medal match	F	Gold medal match

Sun 25	Mon 26	Tue 27	Wed 28	Thu 29	Fri 30	Sat 31	Sun 1	Mon 2	Tue 3	Wed 4	Thu 5	Fri 6	Sat 7	Sun 8	
G		G		G		G		G		¼		½		B	F

== Qualification ==
Qualification	Date	Host	Vacancies	Qualified
Host nation	—N/a	—N/a	1	Japan
2018 European Championship	29 November – 16 December 2018	France	1	France
2019 Pan American Games	24–30 July 2019	(Peru) Lima	1	Brazil
2019 Asian Qualification Tournament	23–29 September 2019	(China) Chuzhou	1	South Korea
2019 African Qualification Tournament	26–29 September 2019	(Senegal) Dakar	1	Angola
2019 World Championship	29 November – 15 December 2019	Japan	1	Netherlands
2020 IHF Women's Olympic Qualification Tournaments	19–21 March 2021	(Spain) Llíria	2	Spain; Sweden
2020 IHF Women's Olympic Qualification Tournaments	19–21 March 2021	(Hungary) Győr	2	ROC; Hungary
2020 IHF Women's Olympic Qualification Tournaments	19–21 March 2021	(Montenegro) Podgorica	2	Montenegro; Norway
Total			12	

== Draw ==
The draw was held on 1 April 2021.

=== Seeding ===
The seeding was revealed on 21 March 2021.

Pot 1	Pot 2	Pot 3	Pot 4	Pot 5	Pot 6
Netherlands; Spain	ROC; Montenegro	Norway; Hungary	Sweden; Japan	France; South Korea	Angola; Brazil

== Referees ==
The referee pairs were announced on 21 April 2021.

Referees
Algeria	Youcef Belkhiri; Sid Ali Hamidi
Argentina	María Paolantoni; Mariana García
Croatia	Matija Gubica; Boris Milošević
Czech Republic	Václav Horáček; Jiří Novotný
Denmark	Mads Hansen; Jesper Madsen
Egypt	Yasmina El-Saied; Heidy El-Saied
France	Charlotte Bonaventura; Julie Bonaventura
Germany	Robert Schulze; Tobias Tönnies

Referees
North Macedonia	Gjorgji Nachevski; Slave Nikolov
Portugal	Duarte Santos; Ricardo Fonseca
Russia	Viktoriia Alpaidze; Tatiana Berezkina
Slovenia	Bojan Lah; David Sok
South Korea	Koo Bon-ok; Lee Se-ok
Spain	Óscar Raluy; Ángel Sabroso
Sweden	Mirza Kurtagic; Mattias Wetterwik
Switzerland	Arthur Brunner; Morad Salah

== Group stage ==
All times are local (UTC+9).

=== Group A ===
Pos	Team	Pld	W	D	L	GF	GA	GD	Pts	Qualification
1	Norway	5	5	0	0	170	123	+47	10	Quarter-finals
2	Netherlands	5	4	0	1	169	143	+26	8	Quarter-finals
3	Montenegro	5	2	0	3	139	142	−3	4	Quarter-finals
4	South Korea	5	1	1	3	147	165	−18	3 (Note: South Korea 31–31 Angola)	Quarter-finals
5	Angola	5	1	1	3	130	156	−26	3	
6	Japan (H)	5	1	0	4	124	150	−26	2	

Source: Tokyo 2020 and IHF
Rules for classification: 1) Points; 2) Head-to-head points; 3) Head-to-head goal difference; 4) Head-to-head goals scored; 5) Goal difference; 6) Goals scored; 7) Draw.
(H) Hosts
Notes:

25 July 2021; 09:00	Netherlands	32–21	Japan	Yoyogi National Gymnasium, Tokyo; Referees: García, Paolantoni (ARG)
25 July 2021; 09:00	Abbingh 7	(18–10)	Fujii 5	Yoyogi National Gymnasium, Tokyo; Referees: García, Paolantoni (ARG)
25 July 2021; 09:00	2× (suspension)	Report	1× (yellow card) 3× (suspension)	Yoyogi National Gymnasium, Tokyo; Referees: García, Paolantoni (ARG)

25 July 2021; 14:15	Montenegro	33–22	Angola	Yoyogi National Gymnasium, Tokyo; Referees: Alpaidze, Berezkina (RUS)
25 July 2021; 14:15	Radičević 12	(13–12)	Kamalandua 6	Yoyogi National Gymnasium, Tokyo; Referees: Alpaidze, Berezkina (RUS)
25 July 2021; 14:15	2× (yellow card) 3× (suspension)	Report	5× (suspension)	Yoyogi National Gymnasium, Tokyo; Referees: Alpaidze, Berezkina (RUS)

25 July 2021; 16:15	Norway	39–27	South Korea	Yoyogi National Gymnasium, Tokyo; Referees: Bonaventura, Bonaventura (FRA)
25 July 2021; 16:15	Brattset Dale 11	(18–10)	Sim 5	Yoyogi National Gymnasium, Tokyo; Referees: Bonaventura, Bonaventura (FRA)
25 July 2021; 16:15	5× (suspension)	Report	1× (yellow card) 2× (suspension)	Yoyogi National Gymnasium, Tokyo; Referees: Bonaventura, Bonaventura (FRA)

27 July 2021; 09:00	Japan	29–26	Montenegro	Yoyogi National Gymnasium, Tokyo; Referees: Alpaidze, Berezkina (RUS)
27 July 2021; 09:00	Hara, Ikehara 6	(14–13)	Brnović 6	Yoyogi National Gymnasium, Tokyo; Referees: Alpaidze, Berezkina (RUS)
27 July 2021; 09:00	1× (yellow card) 8× (suspension) 1× (red card)	Report	2× (yellow card) 3× (suspension)	Yoyogi National Gymnasium, Tokyo; Referees: Alpaidze, Berezkina (RUS)

27 July 2021; 16:15	South Korea	36–43	Netherlands	Yoyogi National Gymnasium, Tokyo; Referees: Lah, Sok (SLO)
27 July 2021; 16:15	Ryu 10	(15–19)	Abbingh 6	Yoyogi National Gymnasium, Tokyo; Referees: Lah, Sok (SLO)
27 July 2021; 16:15	1× (yellow card) 2× (suspension)	Report	2× (yellow card) 7× (suspension)	Yoyogi National Gymnasium, Tokyo; Referees: Lah, Sok (SLO)

27 July 2021; 19:30	Angola	21–30	Norway	Yoyogi National Gymnasium, Tokyo; Referees: García, Paolantoni (ARG)
27 July 2021; 19:30	Guialo, Kassoma 6	(10–15)	Solberg-Isaksen 7	Yoyogi National Gymnasium, Tokyo; Referees: García, Paolantoni (ARG)
27 July 2021; 19:30	4× (suspension)	Report	2× (yellow card) 3× (suspension)	Yoyogi National Gymnasium, Tokyo; Referees: García, Paolantoni (ARG)

29 July 2021; 09:00	Netherlands	37–28	Angola	Yoyogi National Gymnasium, Tokyo; Referees: El-Saied, El-Saied (EGY)
29 July 2021; 09:00	Van Wetering 7	(17–15)	Guialo 8	Yoyogi National Gymnasium, Tokyo; Referees: El-Saied, El-Saied (EGY)
29 July 2021; 09:00	1× (yellow card) 1× (suspension) 1× (red card)	Report	5× (suspension)	Yoyogi National Gymnasium, Tokyo; Referees: El-Saied, El-Saied (EGY)

29 July 2021; 14:15	Japan	24–27	South Korea	Yoyogi National Gymnasium, Tokyo; Referees: Kurtagic, Wetterwik (SWE)
29 July 2021; 14:15	Kondo 7	(11–12)	Ryu 9	Yoyogi National Gymnasium, Tokyo; Referees: Kurtagic, Wetterwik (SWE)
29 July 2021; 14:15	1× (yellow card) 3× (suspension)	Report	3× (suspension)	Yoyogi National Gymnasium, Tokyo; Referees: Kurtagic, Wetterwik (SWE)

29 July 2021; 16:15	Montenegro	23–35	Norway	Yoyogi National Gymnasium, Tokyo; Referees: Bonaventura, Bonaventura (FRA)
29 July 2021; 16:15	Radičević 6	(13–13)	Mørk, Reistad 7	Yoyogi National Gymnasium, Tokyo; Referees: Bonaventura, Bonaventura (FRA)
29 July 2021; 16:15	2× (yellow card) 3× (suspension)	Report	3× (suspension)	Yoyogi National Gymnasium, Tokyo; Referees: Bonaventura, Bonaventura (FRA)

31 July 2021; 09:00	Angola	28–25	Japan	Yoyogi National Gymnasium, Tokyo; Referees: García, Paolantoni (ARG)
31 July 2021; 09:00	three players 5	(15–13)	Hara 6	Yoyogi National Gymnasium, Tokyo; Referees: García, Paolantoni (ARG)
31 July 2021; 09:00	1× (yellow card) 2× (suspension)	Report	1× (yellow card) 1× (suspension)	Yoyogi National Gymnasium, Tokyo; Referees: García, Paolantoni (ARG)

31 July 2021; 11:00	Montenegro	28–26	South Korea	Yoyogi National Gymnasium, Tokyo; Referees: El-Saied, El-Saied (EGY)
31 July 2021; 11:00	Radičević 6	(13–11)	Lee 10	Yoyogi National Gymnasium, Tokyo; Referees: El-Saied, El-Saied (EGY)
31 July 2021; 11:00	2× (yellow card) 4× (suspension)	Report	3× (suspension)	Yoyogi National Gymnasium, Tokyo; Referees: El-Saied, El-Saied (EGY)

31 July 2021; 21:30	Norway	29–27	Netherlands	Yoyogi National Gymnasium, Tokyo; Referees: Alpaidze, Berezkina (RUS)
31 July 2021; 21:30	Mørk 9	(16–13)	Smits 7	Yoyogi National Gymnasium, Tokyo; Referees: Alpaidze, Berezkina (RUS)
31 July 2021; 21:30	2× (suspension)	Report	3× (suspension)	Yoyogi National Gymnasium, Tokyo; Referees: Alpaidze, Berezkina (RUS)

2 August 2021; 09:00	South Korea	31–31	Angola	Yoyogi National Gymnasium, Tokyo; Referees: Bonaventura, Bonaventura (FRA)
2 August 2021; 09:00	Jung, Kang E. 7	(16–17)	Guialo 8	Yoyogi National Gymnasium, Tokyo; Referees: Bonaventura, Bonaventura (FRA)
2 August 2021; 09:00		Report	7× (suspension)	Yoyogi National Gymnasium, Tokyo; Referees: Bonaventura, Bonaventura (FRA)

2 August 2021; 19:30	Netherlands	30–29	Montenegro	Yoyogi National Gymnasium, Tokyo; Referees: Fonseca, Santos (POR)
2 August 2021; 19:30	Van der Heijden 5	(17–12)	Radičević 8	Yoyogi National Gymnasium, Tokyo; Referees: Fonseca, Santos (POR)
2 August 2021; 19:30	1× (yellow card) 5× (suspension)	Report	2× (yellow card) 3× (suspension)	Yoyogi National Gymnasium, Tokyo; Referees: Fonseca, Santos (POR)

2 August 2021; 21:30	Norway	37–25	Japan	Yoyogi National Gymnasium, Tokyo; Referees: El-Saied, El-Saied (EGY)
2 August 2021; 21:30	Frafjord 6	(16–11)	Ohyama, Yokoshima 5	Yoyogi National Gymnasium, Tokyo; Referees: El-Saied, El-Saied (EGY)
2 August 2021; 21:30	3× (suspension)	Report	2× (yellow card) 1× (suspension)	Yoyogi National Gymnasium, Tokyo; Referees: El-Saied, El-Saied (EGY)

=== Group B ===
Pos	Team	Pld	W	D	L	GF	GA	GD	Pts	Qualification
1	Sweden	5	3	1	1	152	133	+19	7 (Note: Sweden 36–24 ROC)	Quarter-finals
2	ROC	5	3	1	1	148	149	−1	7	Quarter-finals
3	France	5	2	1	2	139	135	+4	5	Quarter-finals
4	Hungary	5	2	0	3	142	149	−7	4 (Note: Hungary 29–25 Spain)	Quarter-finals
5	Spain	5	2	0	3	135	142	−7	4	
6	Brazil	5	1	1	3	133	141	−8	3	

Source: Tokyo 2020 and IHF
Rules for classification: 1) Points; 2) Head-to-head points; 3) Head-to-head goal difference; 4) Head-to-head goals scored; 5) Goal difference; 6) Goals scored; 7) Draw.
Notes:

25 July 2021; 11:00	ROC	24–24	Brazil	Yoyogi National Gymnasium, Tokyo; Referees: Fonseca, Santos (POR)
25 July 2021; 11:00	Ilyina 6	(14–12)	De Paula 7	Yoyogi National Gymnasium, Tokyo; Referees: Fonseca, Santos (POR)
25 July 2021; 11:00	2× (yellow card) 3× (suspension)	Report	1× (yellow card) 4× (suspension)	Yoyogi National Gymnasium, Tokyo; Referees: Fonseca, Santos (POR)

25 July 2021; 19:30	Spain	24–31	Sweden	Yoyogi National Gymnasium, Tokyo; Referees: Koo, Lee (KOR)
25 July 2021; 19:30	Pena 7	(9–13)	Hansson 6	Yoyogi National Gymnasium, Tokyo; Referees: Koo, Lee (KOR)
25 July 2021; 19:30	1× (yellow card) 3× (suspension)	Report	2× (suspension)	Yoyogi National Gymnasium, Tokyo; Referees: Koo, Lee (KOR)

25 July 2021; 21:30	Hungary	29–30	France	Yoyogi National Gymnasium, Tokyo; Referees: Hansen, Madsen (DEN)
25 July 2021; 21:30	Vámos 7	(12–15)	Zaadi 10	Yoyogi National Gymnasium, Tokyo; Referees: Hansen, Madsen (DEN)
25 July 2021; 21:30	3× (suspension)	Report	1× (yellow card) 4× (suspension)	Yoyogi National Gymnasium, Tokyo; Referees: Hansen, Madsen (DEN)

27 July 2021; 11:00	Brazil	33–27	Hungary	Yoyogi National Gymnasium, Tokyo; Referees: Koo, Lee (KOR)
27 July 2021; 11:00	Belo, Vieira 7	(17–11)	Schatzl 7	Yoyogi National Gymnasium, Tokyo; Referees: Koo, Lee (KOR)
27 July 2021; 11:00	1× (yellow card) 4× (suspension)	Report	3× (suspension)	Yoyogi National Gymnasium, Tokyo; Referees: Koo, Lee (KOR)

27 July 2021; 14:15	Sweden	36–24	ROC	Yoyogi National Gymnasium, Tokyo; Referees: El-Saied, El-Saied (EGY)
27 July 2021; 14:15	Strömberg 8	(15–9)	Vedekhina 5	Yoyogi National Gymnasium, Tokyo; Referees: El-Saied, El-Saied (EGY)
27 July 2021; 14:15	1× (suspension)	Report	1× (yellow card) 4× (suspension)	Yoyogi National Gymnasium, Tokyo; Referees: El-Saied, El-Saied (EGY)

27 July 2021; 21:30	France	25–28	Spain	Yoyogi National Gymnasium, Tokyo; Referees: Brunner, Salah (SUI)
27 July 2021; 21:30	Coatanea, Pineau 5	(12–12)	Martín 6	Yoyogi National Gymnasium, Tokyo; Referees: Brunner, Salah (SUI)
27 July 2021; 21:30	2× (yellow card) 3× (suspension)	Report	2× (yellow card) 5× (suspension)	Yoyogi National Gymnasium, Tokyo; Referees: Brunner, Salah (SUI)

29 July 2021; 11:00	Spain	27–23	Brazil	Yoyogi National Gymnasium, Tokyo; Referees: Hansen, Madsen (DEN)
29 July 2021; 11:00	Pena 7	(13–13)	De Paula 8	Yoyogi National Gymnasium, Tokyo; Referees: Hansen, Madsen (DEN)
29 July 2021; 11:00	1× (yellow card) 1× (suspension)	Report	1× (yellow card) 3× (suspension)	Yoyogi National Gymnasium, Tokyo; Referees: Hansen, Madsen (DEN)

29 July 2021; 19:30	Hungary	31–38	ROC	Yoyogi National Gymnasium, Tokyo; Referees: Brunner, Salah (SUI)
29 July 2021; 19:30	Klujber 9	(17–22)	Dmitrieva 7	Yoyogi National Gymnasium, Tokyo; Referees: Brunner, Salah (SUI)
29 July 2021; 19:30	1× (yellow card) 5× (suspension)	Report	1× (yellow card) 5× (suspension)	Yoyogi National Gymnasium, Tokyo; Referees: Brunner, Salah (SUI)

29 July 2021; 21:30	Sweden	28–28	France	Yoyogi National Gymnasium, Tokyo; Referees: Fonseca, Santos (POR)
29 July 2021; 21:30	Strömberg 7	(16–17)	Foppa 6	Yoyogi National Gymnasium, Tokyo; Referees: Fonseca, Santos (POR)
29 July 2021; 21:30	1× (yellow card) 3× (suspension)	Report	1× (yellow card) 4× (suspension)	Yoyogi National Gymnasium, Tokyo; Referees: Fonseca, Santos (POR)

31 July 2021; 14:15	ROC	28–27	France	Yoyogi National Gymnasium, Tokyo; Referees: Hansen, Madsen (DEN)
31 July 2021; 14:15	Ilyina 9	(15–17)	Pineau 9	Yoyogi National Gymnasium, Tokyo; Referees: Hansen, Madsen (DEN)
31 July 2021; 14:15	2× (yellow card) 1× (suspension)	Report	1× (yellow card) 2× (suspension)	Yoyogi National Gymnasium, Tokyo; Referees: Hansen, Madsen (DEN)

31 July 2021; 16:15	Brazil	31–34	Sweden	Yoyogi National Gymnasium, Tokyo; Referees: Koo, Lee (KOR)
31 July 2021; 16:15	Do Nascimento 7	(13–15)	Hansson, Roberts 6	Yoyogi National Gymnasium, Tokyo; Referees: Koo, Lee (KOR)
31 July 2021; 16:15	1× (yellow card) 4× (suspension)	Report	5× (suspension)	Yoyogi National Gymnasium, Tokyo; Referees: Koo, Lee (KOR)

31 July 2021; 19:30	Hungary	29–25	Spain	Yoyogi National Gymnasium, Tokyo; Referees: Fonseca, Santos (POR)
31 July 2021; 19:30	Klujber, Vámos 6	(14–11)	Gutiérrez Bermejo, Martín 5	Yoyogi National Gymnasium, Tokyo; Referees: Fonseca, Santos (POR)
31 July 2021; 19:30	1× (yellow card) 5× (suspension)	Report	2× (suspension)	Yoyogi National Gymnasium, Tokyo; Referees: Fonseca, Santos (POR)

2 August 2021; 11:00	France	29–22	Brazil	Yoyogi National Gymnasium, Tokyo; Referees: Lah, Sok (SLO)
2 August 2021; 11:00	Lassource, Pineau 4	(17–11)	Do Nascimento 6	Yoyogi National Gymnasium, Tokyo; Referees: Lah, Sok (SLO)
2 August 2021; 11:00	2× (suspension)	Report	2× (suspension)	Yoyogi National Gymnasium, Tokyo; Referees: Lah, Sok (SLO)

2 August 2021; 14:15	Spain	31–34	ROC	Yoyogi National Gymnasium, Tokyo; Referees: Hansen, Madsen (DEN)
2 August 2021; 14:15	López 7	(17–18)	Vyakhireva 7	Yoyogi National Gymnasium, Tokyo; Referees: Hansen, Madsen (DEN)
2 August 2021; 14:15	1× (yellow card) 1× (suspension)	Report	2× (suspension)	Yoyogi National Gymnasium, Tokyo; Referees: Hansen, Madsen (DEN)

2 August 2021; 16:15	Hungary	26–23	Sweden	Yoyogi National Gymnasium, Tokyo; Referees: García, Paolantoni (ARG)
2 August 2021; 16:15	five players 4	(15–15)	Carlson, Hagman 5	Yoyogi National Gymnasium, Tokyo; Referees: García, Paolantoni (ARG)
2 August 2021; 16:15	1× (suspension) 1× (red card)	Report	5× (suspension)	Yoyogi National Gymnasium, Tokyo; Referees: García, Paolantoni (ARG)

== Knockout stage ==
=== Bracket ===
Quarterfinals
4 August
Norway	26
Hungary	22
4 August
Montenegro	26
ROC	32
4 August
France	32
Netherlands	22
4 August
Sweden	39
South Korea	30

Semifinals
6 August
Norway	26
ROC	27
6 August
France	29
Sweden	27

Gold medal
8 August
ROC	25
France	30
Bronze medal
8 August
Norway	36
Sweden	19

=== Quarterfinals ===
4 August 2021; 09:30	Montenegro	26–32	ROC	Yoyogi National Gymnasium, Tokyo; Referees: Kurtagic, Wetterwik (SWE)
4 August 2021; 09:30	Radičević 10	(15–17)	Vyakhireva 8	Yoyogi National Gymnasium, Tokyo; Referees: Kurtagic, Wetterwik (SWE)
4 August 2021; 09:30	1× (yellow card) 1× (suspension)	Report	7× (suspension)	Yoyogi National Gymnasium, Tokyo; Referees: Kurtagic, Wetterwik (SWE)

4 August 2021; 13:15	Norway	26–22	Hungary	Yoyogi National Gymnasium, Tokyo; Referees: Bonaventura, Bonaventura (FRA)
4 August 2021; 13:15	Brattset Dale 7	(12–10)	Szöllősi-Zácsik 5	Yoyogi National Gymnasium, Tokyo; Referees: Bonaventura, Bonaventura (FRA)
4 August 2021; 13:15		Report	2× (suspension)	Yoyogi National Gymnasium, Tokyo; Referees: Bonaventura, Bonaventura (FRA)

4 August 2021; 17:00	Sweden	39–30	South Korea	Yoyogi National Gymnasium, Tokyo; Referees: Alpaidze, Berezkina (RUS)
4 August 2021; 17:00	three players 6	(21–13)	Kang K. 8	Yoyogi National Gymnasium, Tokyo; Referees: Alpaidze, Berezkina (RUS)
4 August 2021; 17:00	1× (yellow card) 3× (suspension)	Report	4× (suspension)	Yoyogi National Gymnasium, Tokyo; Referees: Alpaidze, Berezkina (RUS)

4 August 2021; 20:45	France	32–22	Netherlands	Yoyogi National Gymnasium, Tokyo; Referees: Hansen, Madsen (DEN)
4 August 2021; 20:45	Flippes 6	(19–11)	Malestein 5	Yoyogi National Gymnasium, Tokyo; Referees: Hansen, Madsen (DEN)
4 August 2021; 20:45	1× (suspension)	Report	4× (suspension)	Yoyogi National Gymnasium, Tokyo; Referees: Hansen, Madsen (DEN)

=== Semifinals ===
6 August 2021; 17:00	France	29–27	Sweden	Yoyogi National Gymnasium, Tokyo; Referees: Lah, Sok (SLO)
6 August 2021; 17:00	Zaadi 7	(15–14)	Carlson, Westberg 6	Yoyogi National Gymnasium, Tokyo; Referees: Lah, Sok (SLO)
6 August 2021; 17:00	1× (yellow card) 6× (suspension)	Report	1× (yellow card) 4× (suspension) 1× (red card)	Yoyogi National Gymnasium, Tokyo; Referees: Lah, Sok (SLO)

6 August 2021; 21:00	Norway	26–27	ROC	Yoyogi National Gymnasium, Tokyo; Referees: Bonaventura, Bonaventura (FRA)
6 August 2021; 21:00	Mørk 10	(11–14)	Vyakhireva 9	Yoyogi National Gymnasium, Tokyo; Referees: Bonaventura, Bonaventura (FRA)
6 August 2021; 21:00	1× (yellow card) 4× (suspension)	Report	1× (yellow card) 3× (suspension) 1× (red card)	Yoyogi National Gymnasium, Tokyo; Referees: Bonaventura, Bonaventura (FRA)

=== Bronze medal game ===
8 August 2021; 11:00	Norway	36–19	Sweden	Yoyogi National Gymnasium, Tokyo; Referees: Alpaidze, Berezkina (RUS)
8 August 2021; 11:00	Brattset Dale, Mørk 8	(19–7)	Carlson, Westberg 4	Yoyogi National Gymnasium, Tokyo; Referees: Alpaidze, Berezkina (RUS)
8 August 2021; 11:00	1× (yellow card) 3× (suspension)	Report	3× (suspension)	Yoyogi National Gymnasium, Tokyo; Referees: Alpaidze, Berezkina (RUS)

=== Gold medal game ===
8 August 2021; 15:00	ROC	25–30	France	Yoyogi National Gymnasium, Tokyo; Referees: Lah, Sok (SLO)
8 August 2021; 15:00	Vedekhina 7	(13–15)	Foppa, Pineau 7	Yoyogi National Gymnasium, Tokyo; Referees: Lah, Sok (SLO)
8 August 2021; 15:00	1× (yellow card) 5× (suspension)	Report	1× (yellow card) 5× (suspension)	Yoyogi National Gymnasium, Tokyo; Referees: Lah, Sok (SLO)

== Ranking and statistics ==
=== Final ranking ===
Rank	Team
Gold medal	France
Silver medal	ROC
Bronze medal	Norway
4	Sweden
5	Netherlands
6	Montenegro
7	Hungary
8	South Korea
9	Spain
10	Angola
11	Brazil
12	Japan

=== All Star Team ===
The all-star team was announced on 8 August 2021.

Position	Player
Goalkeeper	(Norway) Katrine Lunde
Left wing	(Russia) Polina Kuznetsova
Left back	(Sweden) Jamina Roberts
Centre back	(France) Grâce Zaadi
Right back	(Russia) Anna Vyakhireva
Right wing	(France) Laura Flippes
Pivot	(France) Pauletta Foppa
MVP	(Russia) Anna Vyakhireva

=== Top goalscorers ===
Rank	Name	Goals	Shots	%
1	(Norway) Nora Mørk	52	72	72
2	(Montenegro) Jovanka Radičević	46	57	81
3	(Russia) Anna Vyakhireva	43	71	61
4	(Sweden) Jamina Roberts	39	59	66
5	(Russia) Yekaterina Ilyina	35	49	71
6	(France) Pauletta Foppa	34	42	81
6	(Sweden) Carin Strömberg	34	62	55
8	(Norway) Kari Brattset Dale	33	43	77
8	(Russia) Daria Dmitrieva	33	55	60
8	(France) Grâce Zaadi	33	56	59

Source: IHF

=== Top goalkeepers ===
Rank	Name	%	Saves	Shots
1	(Norway) Katrine Lunde	37,8	45	119
2	(Japan) Minami Itano	36,7	18	49
3	(Norway) Silje Solberg	35,8	62	173
4	(Japan) Sakura Hauge	33,7	56	166
5	(France) Cléopatre Darleux	32,8	43	131
5	(Sweden) Jessica Ryde	32,8	39	119
7	(Spain) Silvia Navarro	32,6	44	135
8	(France) Amandine Leynaud	30,3	50	165
9	(Russia) Anna Sedoykina	28,7	50	174
10	(Hungary) Blanka Bíró	28,2	50	177

Source: IHF

== Medalists ==
Gold	Silver	Bronze
France Méline Nocandy; Blandine Dancette; Pauline Coatanea; Chloé Valentini; Allison Pineau; Coralie Lassource (c); Grâce Zaadi Deuna; Amandine Leynaud (GK); Kalidiatou Niakaté; Cléopatre Darleux (GK); Océane Sercien-Ugolin; Laura Flippes; Béatrice Edwige; Pauletta Foppa; Estelle Nze Minko; Alexandra Lacrabère Head coach: Olivier Krumbholz	ROC Anna Sedoykina (GK); Polina Kuznetsova; Polina Gorshkova; Daria Dmitrieva (c); Anna Sen; Anna Vyakhireva; Polina Vedekhina; Vladlena Bobrovnikova; Kseniya Makeyeva; Elena Mikhaylichenko; Olga Fomina; Ekaterina Ilina; Yulia Managarova; Antonina Skorobogatchenko; Victoriya Kalinina (GK) Head coach: Alexey Alekseev	Norway Henny Reistad; Veronica Kristiansen; Marit Malm Frafjord; Stine Skogrand; Nora Mørk; Stine Bredal Oftedal (c); Silje Solberg (GK); Kari Brattset Dale; Katrine Lunde (GK); Marit Røsberg Jacobsen; Camilla Herrem; Sanna Solberg-Isaksen; Kristine Breistøl; Marta Tomac; Vilde Johansen Head coach: Thorir Hergeirsson
