= Coralie Lassource =

French handball player (born 1992)

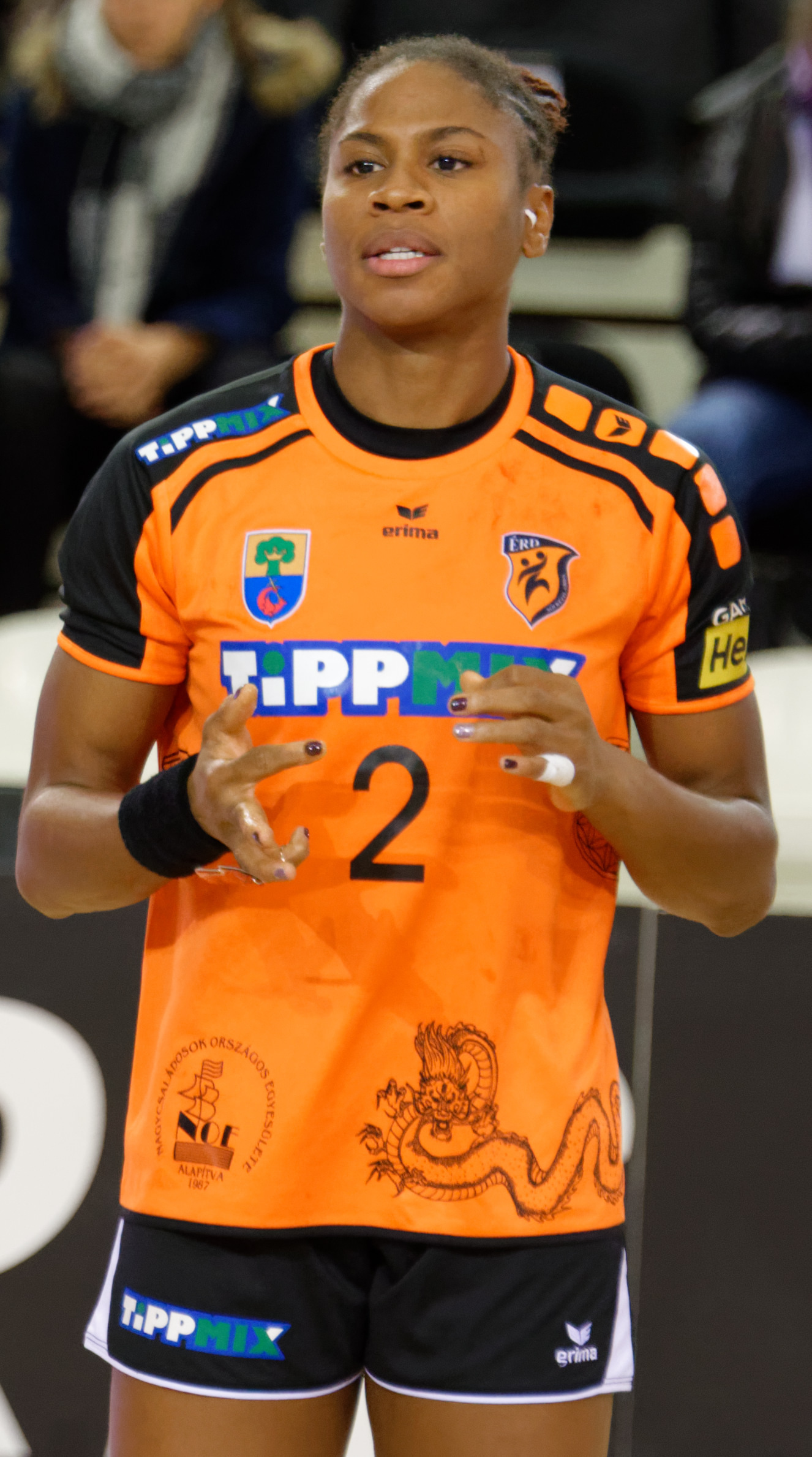
- Lassource in 2017

Personal information
- Full name: Coralie Gladys Lassource
- Nationality: French
- Born: 1 September 1992 (age 34) Maisons-Laffitte, France
- Height: 1.70 m (5 ft 7 in)

Sport
- Sport: Handball
- Position: Left wing
- Current club: Brest Bretagne HB
- Number: 10

Senior clubs
- Years: Team
- 2008–2017: Issy-Paris Hand
- 2017–2019: Érd HC
- 2019–: Brest Bretagne HB
National team
| Years | Team | Apps | (Gls) |
| 2015– | France | 71 | (120) |
Medal record
Olympic Games
| Gold medal – first place | 2020 Tokyo | Team |
| Silver medal – second place | 2024 Paris | Team |
World Championship
| Gold medal – first place | 2023 Denmark/Norway/Sweden |
| Silver medal – second place | 2021 Spain |
European Championship
| Silver medal – second place | 2020 Denmark |

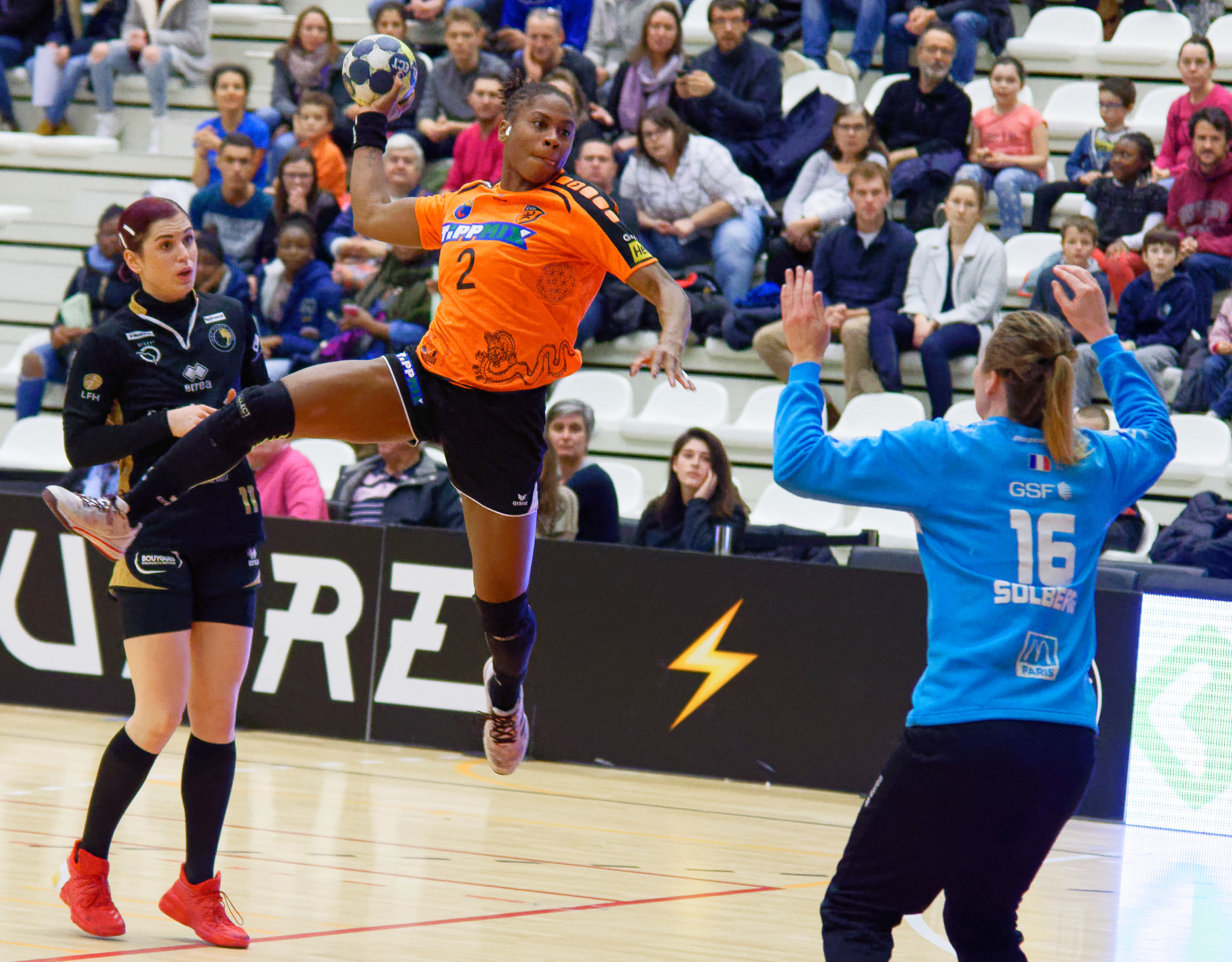
Lassource on November 18, 2017

Coralie Gladys Lassource (born 1 September 1992) is a French handball player who plays for Brest Bretagne Handball and the French national team as a left wing. She is the older sister of handballer Déborah Lassource, who plays for German club Borussia Dortmund as a left back.

== Handball career ==
Lassource started playing handball at the age of 10. She later joined the 2nd team of Issy-Paris Hand, where she eventually made her senior debut. In 2010, she won the second league with the club. In 2013, she won the French League Cup. In the same season, the team reached the final of the EHF Cup Winners' Cup, where they lost to Austrian Hypo NÖ.

She competed at the 2015 World Women's Handball Championship in Denmark.

In 2017, she joined Hungarian side Érd HC.

She became the captain of Brest Bretagne Handball when she joined the team in 2019. In 2021, she won the French championship with the club.

She was the captain of the French national handball team from June 2021 for the 2020 Summer Olympics during which the team won their first Olympic gold medal, until September 2022, a few months before the Euro 2022.

Her younger sister Déborah Lassource is also a professional handball player. They used to play together at Issy Paris Hand. Their mother also used to play handball.

She wears a number 10 jersey for Brest Bretagne Handball and a number 8 jersey for the national team.

== Achievements ==
=== Club ===
==== International ====
- EHF Champions League
  - Finalist: 2021 (with Brest Bretagne Handball)
- EHF Cup Winners' Cup
  - Runner up: 2013 (with Issy Paris Hand)
- EHF Challenge Cup
  - Runner up: 2014 (with Issy Paris Hand)
  - 1/2 Finalist: 2014, 2015, 2016

==== Domestic ====
- French league (Division 1 Féminine):
  - Winner (gold) : 2021 (with Brest Bretagne Handball)
  - Tied 1st: 2020 (with Brest Bretagne Handball)
  - Runner up: 2012, 2014, 2015 (with Issy Paris Hand) and 2022 (with Brest Bretagne Handball)
  - 3rd: 2017 (with Issy Paris Hand)
- French Cup (Coupe de France):
  - Winner (gold) : 2021 (with Brest Bretagne Handball)
  - Runner up: 2014 and 2017 (with Issy Paris Hand)
- French League Cup (Coupe de la Ligue):
  - Winner (gold) : 2013 (with Issy Paris Hand)

=== National team ===
- Olympic Games
  - 2020: Gold
- World Championship:
  - 2015: 7th
  - 2021: Silver
  - 2023: Gold
- European Championship
  - 2020: Silver
  - 2022: 4th
- Junior World Championship
  - 2012: Silver

== Individual awards ==
- French Championship
  - Hope of the Season: 2012
  - Best Defender: 2016
  - Best Left wing: 2017
- World Championship
  - Best Left wing: 2021

== Honors ==
- Inducted into the Legion of Honor with the rank of Chevalier: 2021
