= Jenny Carlson =

Swedish handball player (born 1995)

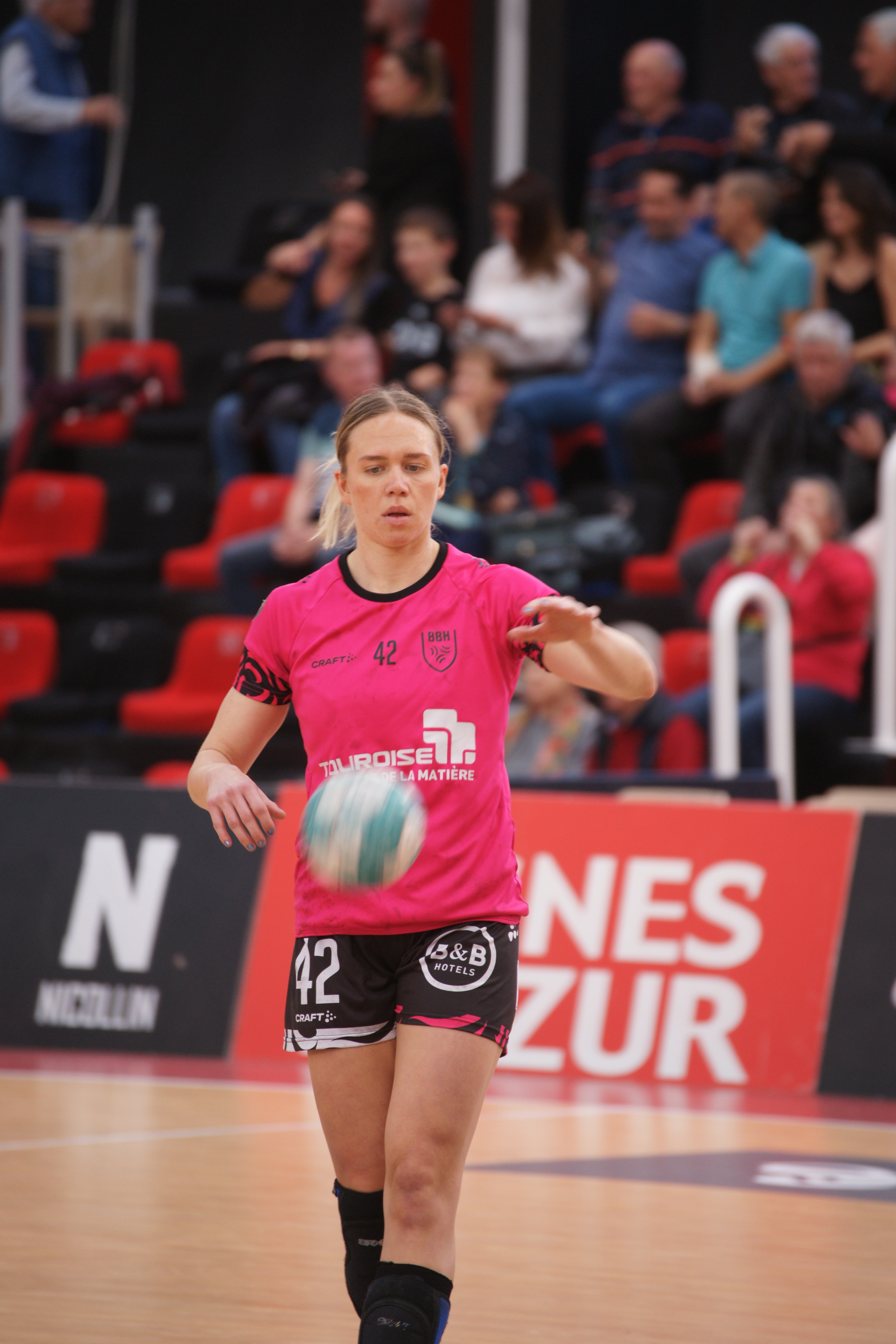

Personal information
- Full name: Jenny Helen Karlsson
- Nationality: Swedish
- Born: 17 April 1995 (age 31) Gothenburg, Sweden
- Height: 1.72 m (5 ft 8 in)

Sport
- Sport: Handball
- Position: Centre back
- Current club: CSM București
- Number: 42

Senior clubs
- Years: Team
- 2011–2014: Kärra HF
- 2014–2018: Lugi HF
- 2018–2019: Ringkøbing Håndbold
- 2019–2020: EH Aalborg
- 2020–2022: Holstebro Håndbold
- 2022–2024: Brest Bretagne Handball
- 2024–2025: HB Ludwigsburg
- 2025–2026: Molde Elite
- 2026–: CSM București
National team
Years	Team	Apps	(Gls)
2021–	Sweden	95	(246)

Jenny Helen Karlsson (born 17 April 1995), known as Jenny Carlson, is a Swedish handball player who plays for CSM București and the Swedish national team.

She has previously played for Lugi HF in Sweden, Ringkøbing Håndbold, EH Aalborg and Holstebro Håndbold in Danish Handball League. In February 2022 it was announced she'd played her last game for Holstebro, and on 1 March it was announced she joined Brest Bretagne with immediate effect.

She represented Sweden at the 2020 Summer Olympics.

== Achievements ==
=== Club ===
==== Domestic ====
- REMA 1000-ligaen:
  - Bronze: 2025/26
- French league (Division 1 Féminine):
  - Runner up: 2022 (with Brest Bretagne Handball)

=== National team ===
- Olympic Games
  - 2020: 4th
- World Championship:
  - 2021: 5th
- European Championship
  - 2022: 5th
