= 2020 IHF Women's Olympic Qualification Tournaments =

The 2020 IHF Women's Olympic Qualification Tournaments were held from 19 to 21 March 2021, in Spain, Hungary and Montenegro. Four teams took part in each tournament, with the two best-ranked teams qualifying for Tokyo 2020.

On 13 March 2020, the IHF postponed the tournaments due to the COVID-19 pandemic. Previously, the tournaments were scheduled to take place from 20 to 22 March 2020. The tournaments were rescheduled for 19 to 21 March 2021.

== Format ==
There were three Olympic Qualification Tournaments. Only twelve teams that have not yet qualified through the five events mentioned above could play in the tournament:

- The top six teams from the 2019 World Championship that did not already qualify through their continental championships are eligible to participate in the tournament.
- The best ranked teams of each continent in the 2019 World Championship represent the continent in order to determine the continental ranking. The first ranked continent received two more places for the tournament. The second, third and fourth ranked continent received one place each. The last place belongs to a team from Oceania, if one was ranked between 8th–12th at the World Championship. If no team from Oceania met this condition, the second ranked continent receives an extra place instead. The teams that already earned their places through their World Championship ranking will not be considered for receiving places through the continental criterion.
- The twelve teams were allocated in three pools of four teams according to the table below. The top two teams from each pool qualified for the 2020 Olympic Games.

2020 Olympic Qualification Tournament #1	2020 Olympic Qualification Tournament #2	2020 Olympic Qualification Tournament #3
2nd from World: Spain; 7th from World: Sweden; ~~2nd from Africa: Senegal~~; 2nd from the Americas: Argentina	3rd from World: Russia; 6th from World: Serbia; ~~2nd from Asia: China~~; 4th from Asia: Kazakhstan; 7th from Europe: Hungary	4th from World: Norway; 5th from World: Montenegro; 4th from Europe: Romania; ~~3rd from Asia: North Korea~~

On 10 January 2020, North Korea withdrew and was replaced by Kazakhstan.

On 3 February 2020, China and Hong Kong withdrew and were replaced by Thailand. In October 2020, China requested to be reinstated because the tournaments were moved and the IHF granted that request. On 1 March 2021, China withdrew from the tournament due to COVID-19 travel restrictions. Because of that, Kazakhstan was moved to Tournament 2 and no other Asian team was available (Hong Kong declined a participation and Thailand did not respond prior to the deadline), meaning that Tournament 3 was played with three teams. Senegal withdrew on 9 March 2021 and was not replaced by another African team.

== Referees ==
The referees were announced on 25 February 2021.

Tournament 1
Bosnia and Herzegovina	Amar Konjičanin; Dino Konjičanin
Russia	Viktoriia Alpaidze; Tatyana Berezkina
South Korea	Koo Bon-ok; Lee Se-ok
Uruguay	Matías Sosa; Christian Lemes

Tournament 2
Algeria	Youcef Belkhiri; Sid Ali Hamidi
Argentina	María Paolantoni; Mariana García
France	Charlotte Bonaventura; Julie Bonaventura
Romania	Cristina Năstase; Simona Stancu

Tournament 3
Denmark	Karina Christiansen; Line Hesseldal Hansen
Slovenia	Bojan Lah; David Sok
Spain	Ignacio García; Andreu Marín

== Tournament 1 ==
Tournament 1
Tournament details
- Host country: Spain
- Venue: 1 (in 1 host city)
- Dates: 19–21 March 2021
- Teams: 3 (from 2 confederations)

Tournament statistics
- Matches played: 3
- Goals scored: 158 (52.67 per match)
- Attendance: 0 (0 per match)

=== Standings ===
Pos	Team	Pld	W	D	L	GF	GA	GD	Pts	Qualification
1	Spain (H)	2	1	1	0	59	44	+15	3 (Note: Spain 28–28 Sweden)	2020 Summer Olympics
2	Sweden	2	1	1	0	62	49	+13	3	2020 Summer Olympics
3	Argentina	2	0	0	2	37	65	−28	0	

Source: IHF
Rules for classification: 1) Points; 2) Head-to-head points; 3) Head-to-head goal difference; 4) Head-to-head goals scored; 5) Goal difference; 6) Goals scored; 7) Draw.
(H) Hosts
Notes:

All times are local (UTC+1).

=== Matches ===
19 March 2021; 21:00	Spain	28–28	Sweden	Polideportivo Pla de l’Arc, Llíria; Referees: Alpaidze, Berezkina (RUS)
19 March 2021; 21:00	Martín 7	(13–13)	Westberg 7	Polideportivo Pla de l’Arc, Llíria; Referees: Alpaidze, Berezkina (RUS)
19 March 2021; 21:00	4× (suspension)	Report	1× (yellow card) 8× (suspension)	Polideportivo Pla de l’Arc, Llíria; Referees: Alpaidze, Berezkina (RUS)

20 March 2021; 18:15	Sweden	34–21	Argentina	Polideportivo Pla de l’Arc, Llíria; Referees: Koo, Lee (KOR)
20 March 2021; 18:15	Lagerquist 7	(17–8)	Pizzo 5	Polideportivo Pla de l’Arc, Llíria; Referees: Koo, Lee (KOR)
20 March 2021; 18:15	1× (yellow card) 3× (suspension)	Report	1× (suspension) 1× (red card)	Polideportivo Pla de l’Arc, Llíria; Referees: Koo, Lee (KOR)

21 March 2021; 19:30	Argentina	16–31	Spain	Polideportivo Pla de l’Arc, Llíria; Referees: Lemes, Sosa (URU)
21 March 2021; 19:30	Karsten 4	(10–19)	López 7	Polideportivo Pla de l’Arc, Llíria; Referees: Lemes, Sosa (URU)
21 March 2021; 19:30	1× (yellow card) 4× (suspension)	Report	1× (yellow card) 5× (suspension)	Polideportivo Pla de l’Arc, Llíria; Referees: Lemes, Sosa (URU)

== Tournament 2 ==
Tournament 2
Tournament details
- Host country: Hungary
- Venue: 1 (in 1 host city)
- Dates: 19–21 March 2021
- Teams: 4 (from 2 confederations)

Tournament statistics
- Matches played: 6
- Goals scored: 355 (59.17 per match)
- Attendance: 0 (0 per match)

=== Standings ===
Pos	Team	Pld	W	D	L	GF	GA	GD	Pts	Qualification
1	Russia	3	3	0	0	91	73	+18	6	2020 Summer Olympics
2	Hungary (H)	3	2	0	1	100	71	+29	4	2020 Summer Olympics
3	Serbia	3	1	0	2	89	90	−1	2	
4	Kazakhstan	3	0	0	3	75	121	−46	0	

Source: IHF
Rules for classification: 1) Points; 2) Head-to-head points; 3) Head-to-head goal difference; 4) Head-to-head goals scored; 5) Goal difference; 6) Goals scored; 7) Draw.
(H) Hosts

All times are local (UTC+1).

=== Matches ===
19 March 2021; 17:00	Kazakhstan	19–46	Hungary	Audi Aréna, Győr; Referees: Năstase, Stancu (ROU)
19 March 2021; 17:00	Alexandrova 5	(8–20)	Lukács 7	Audi Aréna, Győr; Referees: Năstase, Stancu (ROU)
19 March 2021; 17:00	2× (suspension) 1× (red card)	Report	2× (yellow card) 4× (suspension)	Audi Aréna, Győr; Referees: Năstase, Stancu (ROU)

19 March 2021; 20:00	Russia	29–24	Serbia	Audi Aréna, Győr; Referees: García, Paolantoni (ARG)
19 March 2021; 20:00	Vyakhireva 7	(17–13)	Pop–Lazić 5	Audi Aréna, Győr; Referees: García, Paolantoni (ARG)
19 March 2021; 20:00	1× (yellow card) 5× (suspension)	Report	5× (suspension) 1× (red card)	Audi Aréna, Győr; Referees: García, Paolantoni (ARG)

20 March 2021; 17:30	Serbia	23–31	Hungary	Audi Aréna, Győr; Referees: Bonaventura, Bonaventura (FRA)
20 March 2021; 17:30	Dmitrović 6	(12–16)	Szöllősi-Zácsik 7	Audi Aréna, Győr; Referees: Bonaventura, Bonaventura (FRA)
20 March 2021; 17:30	3× (suspension)	Report	1× (yellow card) 2× (suspension)	Audi Aréna, Győr; Referees: Bonaventura, Bonaventura (FRA)

20 March 2021; 20:30	Russia	33–26	Kazakhstan	Audi Aréna, Győr; Referees: Belkhiri, Hamidi (ALG)
20 March 2021; 20:30	Fomina 10	(17–16)	Alexandrova 7	Audi Aréna, Győr; Referees: Belkhiri, Hamidi (ALG)
20 March 2021; 20:30	1× (yellow card) 5× (suspension)	Report	1× (yellow card) 2× (suspension)	Audi Aréna, Győr; Referees: Belkhiri, Hamidi (ALG)

21 March 2021; 17:30	Serbia	42–30	Kazakhstan	Audi Aréna, Győr; Referees: Belkhiri, Hamidi (ALG)
21 March 2021; 17:30	Kovačević 8	(23–16)	Alexandrova 9	Audi Aréna, Győr; Referees: Belkhiri, Hamidi (ALG)
21 March 2021; 17:30	1× (suspension)	Report		Audi Aréna, Győr; Referees: Belkhiri, Hamidi (ALG)

21 March 2021; 20:30	Hungary	23–29	Russia	Audi Aréna, Győr; Referees: García, Paolantoni (ARG)
21 March 2021; 20:30	three players 5	(12–14)	Vyakhireva 7	Audi Aréna, Győr; Referees: García, Paolantoni (ARG)
21 March 2021; 20:30	2× (yellow card) 5× (suspension)	Report	1× (yellow card) 1× (suspension) 1× (red card)	Audi Aréna, Győr; Referees: García, Paolantoni (ARG)

== Tournament 3 ==
Tournament 3
Tournament details
- Host country: Montenegro
- Venue: 1 (in 1 host city)
- Dates: 19–21 March 2021
- Teams: 3 (from 1 confederation)

Tournament statistics
- Matches played: 3
- Goals scored: 157 (52.33 per match)
- Attendance: 0 (0 per match)

=== Standings ===
Pos	Team	Pld	W	D	L	GF	GA	GD	Pts	Qualification
1	Montenegro (H)	2	1	0	1	53	51	+2	2	2020 Summer Olympics
2	Norway	2	1	0	1	52	52	0	2	2020 Summer Olympics
3	Romania	2	1	0	1	52	54	−2	2	

Source: IHF
Rules for classification: 1) Points; 2) Head-to-head points; 3) Head-to-head goal difference; 4) Head-to-head goals scored; 5) Goal difference; 6) Goals scored; 7) Draw.
(H) Hosts

All times are local (UTC+1).

=== Matches ===
19 March 2021; 19:30	Norway	23–28	Montenegro	Verde Complex, Podgorica; Referees: Lah, Sok (SLO)
19 March 2021; 19:30	Aune 4	(12–13)	Jauković 7	Verde Complex, Podgorica; Referees: Lah, Sok (SLO)
19 March 2021; 19:30	2× (suspension)	Report	2× (yellow card) 4× (suspension)	Verde Complex, Podgorica; Referees: Lah, Sok (SLO)

20 March 2021; 19:30	Norway	29–24	Romania	Verde Complex, Podgorica; Referees: Christiansen, Hansen (DEN)
20 March 2021; 19:30	Skogrand 12	(13–11)	Neagu 11	Verde Complex, Podgorica; Referees: Christiansen, Hansen (DEN)
20 March 2021; 19:30	2× (yellow card)	Report	1× (yellow card) 4× (suspension)	Verde Complex, Podgorica; Referees: Christiansen, Hansen (DEN)

21 March 2021; 16:00	Montenegro	25–28	Romania	Verde Complex, Podgorica; Referees: García, Marín (ESP)
21 March 2021; 16:00	Jauković 9	(15–15)	Neagu 12	Verde Complex, Podgorica; Referees: García, Marín (ESP)
21 March 2021; 16:00	2× (yellow card) 8× (suspension) 2× (red card)	Report	5× (suspension) 1× (red card)	Verde Complex, Podgorica; Referees: García, Marín (ESP)

== See also ==
- 2020 IHF Men's Olympic Qualification Tournaments
