= 2020 IHF Men's Olympic Qualification Tournaments =

Logo

The 2020 IHF Men's Olympic Qualification Tournaments were held in Montenegro, France and Germany. The top two teams from each of the three tournaments qualified for the 2020 Summer Olympics joining six already qualified teams: host nation, world champions and four winners of continental qualifying events.

The tournaments were initially scheduled to take place from 17 to 19 April 2020, but the IHF postponed them to June 2020 due to the COVID-19 pandemic. Following the postponement of the 2020 Summer Olympics to July–August 2021, the IHF announced on 24 April 2020 that the tournaments would be again rescheduled, taking place from 12 to 14 March 2021.

== Format ==
Similar as for previous editions, there were three Olympic Qualification Tournaments. The twelve teams that have not yet qualified through the five events mentioned above were selected based on their performance in the events. These teams were divided into three tournaments, each containing four teams, with two teams from each tournament qualifying for the olympic tournament.

=== Team selection ===
Based on the 2019 World Championship and four continental qualifying events, the twelve selected teams were chosen as follows, starting with the World Championship:

1. The top six not yet qualified teams from the 2019 World Championship are selected:
  - WC2 to WC7 - teams ranked 2-7 at the World Championship. If one or more these teams have already qualified (by virtue of winning a continental qualification event or hosting the Olympics), the list is moved up by allocating slots to next best ranked teams (8th and/or thereafter) at the World Championship.
2. The other six teams are selected based on Continental ranking and performance in the respective continental qualification events:
  - QS1 to QS4 - slots allocated to the continents ranked one to four respectively. The best ranked teams at the respective continental qualification event not yet qualified and not yet selected will earn the qualification slot.
  - QS5 - the second slot allocated to the first ranked continent. The second best ranked team at the respective event not yet qualified and not yet selected earn the qualification slot.
  - QS6 - the last slot. It is allocated to the best team from Oceania qualifying event, if any team from Oceania was ranked between 8th–12th at the World Championship. Otherwise, it will be allocated to the second ranked continent as an additional place. The second best ranked team at the respective event not yet qualified and not yet selected earn the qualification slot.

=== Pool composition ===
The twelve selected teams were allocated in three pools of four teams according to the table below.

Tournament 1	Tournament 2	Tournament 3
WC2; WC7; QS3; QS4	WC3; WC6; QS2; QS5	WC4; WC5; QS1; QS6

== Teams selected ==
The team selection process determined the twelve teams that competed in the IHF Olympic Qualification Tournaments based on final rankings of 2019 World Championship and four continental events.

=== World Championship ===
Apart from gold medalist and teams which later qualified thru continental qualification events, six best placed teams from 2019 World Championship earned a right to participate in the IHF Olympic Qualification Tournaments. The assignment of their slot position, used for pool allocation, will be based on the final ranking at World Championship.

Rank	Team	Note
1st place, gold medalist(s)	Denmark	Qualified directly as World Champions
2nd place, silver medalist(s)	Norway	WC2
3rd place, bronze medalist(s)	France	WC3
4	Germany	WC4
5	Sweden	WC5
6	Croatia	WC6
7	Spain	Qualified directly by winning Euro 2020
8	Egypt	Qualified directly by winning African championship
9	Brazil	WC7
10	Hungary	
11	Iceland	
12	Tunisia	
13	Qatar	
14	Russia	
15	North Macedonia	
16	Chile	
17	Argentina	Qualified directly by winning Pan American Games
18	Serbia	
19	Austria	
20	Bahrain	Qualified directly by winning Asian qualification event
21	Saudi Arabia	
22	Korea	
23	Angola	
24	Japan	Qualified directly as a host

Key

1. Team qualified directly for Olympics
2. Team advanced to Olympic Qualifying Tournament

=== Continental qualification ===
Apart from teams that have already qualified for Olympics or have already been selected to participate in the Olympic Qualification Tournaments based on their final ranking at World Championship, each continent was rewarded with certain number of qualification slots in accordance with continental ranking from the 2019 World Championship. In total, six additional slots are allocated to all continents and determined according performance at various continental qualification events.

==== Continental ranking ====
The best ranked teams of each continent in the 2019 World Championship represent the continent in order to determine the continental ranking.

Rank	Continent	Best ranked team in World Championship	Team final ranking	Qualification slots
1	Europe	Denmark	1	2
2	Africa	Egypt	8	2^{1}
3	Americas	Brazil	9	1
4	Asia	Qatar	13	1

^{1}Since no team from Oceania participated in the 2019 World Championship, additional slot was allocated to Africa

==== Europe ====
Rank	Team	Note
1st place, gold medalist(s)	Spain	Qualified directly as gold medalist
2nd place, silver medalist(s)	Croatia	
3rd place, bronze medalist(s)	Norway	
4	Slovenia	QS1
5	Germany	
6	Portugal	QS5
7	Sweden	
8	Austria	
9	Hungary	
10	Belarus	
11	Iceland	
12	Czech Republic	
13	Denmark	Qualified directly as World Champions
14	France	
15	North Macedonia	
16	Switzerland	
17	Netherlands	
18	Montenegro	
19	Ukraine	
20	Serbia	
21	Poland	
22	Russia	
23	Bosnia and Herzegovina	
24	Latvia	

==== Africa ====
Rank	Team	Note
Gold medal	Egypt	Qualified directly as gold medalist
Silver medal	Tunisia	QS2
Bronze medal	Algeria	QS6
4	Angola	
5	Cape Verde	
6	Morocco	
7	DR Congo	
8	Gabon	
9	Congo	
10	Guinea	
11	Nigeria	
12	Cameroon	
13	Libya	
14	Ivory Coast	
15	Kenya	
16	Zambia	

==== Americas ====
Rank	Team	Note
1st place, gold medalist(s)	Argentina	Qualified directly as gold medalist
2nd place, silver medalist(s)	Chile	QS3
3rd place, bronze medalist(s)	Brazil	
4	Mexico	
5	Cuba	
6	United States	
7	Puerto Rico	
8	Peru	

==== Asia ====
Rank	Team	Note
1st place, gold medalist(s)	Bahrain	Qualified directly as gold medalist
2nd place, silver medalist(s)	South Korea	QS4
3rd place, bronze medalist(s)	Qatar	
4	Saudi Arabia	
5	Iran	
6	Kuwait	
7	Hong Kong	
8	India	

Key

1. Team qualified directly for Olympics
2. Team advanced to Olympic Qualifying Tournament thru continental event
3. Team advanced to Olympic Qualifying Tournament thru World Championship

The following was the composition of the Olympic Qualification Tournaments:

Tournament 1	Tournament 2	Tournament 3
Norway; Brazil; Chile; South Korea	France; Croatia; Tunisia; Portugal	Germany; Sweden; Slovenia; Algeria

== Referees ==
The referees were announced on 25 February 2021.

Tournament 1
Croatia	Matija Gubica; Boris Milošević
Czech Republic	Václav Horáček; Jiří Novotný
France	Raouf Gasmi; Karim Gasmi
Montenegro	Ivan Pavićević; Miloš Ražnatović

Tournament 2
Germany	Robert Schulze; Tobias Tönnies
Hungary	Ádám Bíró; Olivér Kiss
Sweden	Mirza Kurtagic; Mattias Wetterwik
Switzerland	Arthur Brunner; Morad Salah

Tournament 3
Argentina	Julián Grillo; Sebastián Lenci
Denmark	Mads Hansen; Jesper Madsen
North Macedonia	Gjorgji Nachevski; Slave Nikolov
Spain	Oscar Raluy; Ángel Sabroso

== Tournament 1 ==
Tournament 1
Tournament details
- Host country: Montenegro
- Venue(s): 1 (in 1 host city)
- Dates: 12–14 March 2021
- Teams: 4 (from 3 confederations)

Tournament statistics
- Matches played: 6
- Goals scored: 363 (60.5 per match)
- Attendance: 0 (0 per match)
- Top scorer(s): (South Korea) Park Kwang-soon (22 goals)

=== Standings ===
The tournament will be played in Montenegro, after Norway had to withdraw the right to host.

Pos	Team	Pld	W	D	L	GF	GA	GD	Pts	Qualification
1	Norway	3	3	0	0	114	74	+40	6	2020 Summer Olympics
2	Brazil	3	2	0	1	76	80	−4	4	2020 Summer Olympics
3	South Korea	3	1	0	2	91	109	−18	2	
4	Chile	3	0	0	3	82	100	−18	0	

Source: IHF
Rules for classification: 1) Points; 2) Head-to-head points; 3) Head-to-head goal difference; 4) Head-to-head goals scored; 5) Goal difference; 6) Goals scored; 7) Draw.

=== Matches ===
All times are local (UTC+1).

12 March 2021; 17:30	Chile	35–36	South Korea	Verde Complex, Podgorica, Montenegro; Referees: Gubica, Milošević (CRO)
12 March 2021; 17:30	Ceballos, R. Salinas 8	(11–19)	Jeong 8	Verde Complex, Podgorica, Montenegro; Referees: Gubica, Milošević (CRO)
12 March 2021; 17:30	1× (yellow card) 3× (suspension)	Report	1× (yellow card) 2× (suspension)	Verde Complex, Podgorica, Montenegro; Referees: Gubica, Milošević (CRO)

12 March 2021; 20:00	Norway	32–20	Brazil	Verde Complex, Podgorica, Montenegro; Referees: Pavićević, Ražnatović (MNE)
12 March 2021; 20:00	Sagosen 7	(17–12)	Langaro 4	Verde Complex, Podgorica, Montenegro; Referees: Pavićević, Ražnatović (MNE)
12 March 2021; 20:00	1× (yellow card) 4× (suspension)	Report	1× (yellow card) 5× (suspension)	Verde Complex, Podgorica, Montenegro; Referees: Pavićević, Ražnatović (MNE)

13 March 2021; 17:30	Brazil	30–24	South Korea	Verde Complex, Podgorica, Montenegro; Referees: Horáček, Novotný (CZE)
13 March 2021; 17:30	Chiuffa 7	(13–9)	Jo 6	Verde Complex, Podgorica, Montenegro; Referees: Horáček, Novotný (CZE)
13 March 2021; 17:30	2× (yellow card) 6× (suspension)	Report	2× (suspension)	Verde Complex, Podgorica, Montenegro; Referees: Horáček, Novotný (CZE)

13 March 2021; 20:00	Norway	38–23	Chile	Verde Complex, Podgorica, Montenegro; Referees: Gasmi, Gasmi (FRA)
13 March 2021; 20:00	Gulliksen 10	(19–10)	Ayala 6	Verde Complex, Podgorica, Montenegro; Referees: Gasmi, Gasmi (FRA)
13 March 2021; 20:00	1× (yellow card) 4× (suspension) 1× (red card)	Report	1× (yellow card) 1× (suspension)	Verde Complex, Podgorica, Montenegro; Referees: Gasmi, Gasmi (FRA)

14 March 2021; 17:30	Brazil	26–24	Chile	Verde Complex, Podgorica, Montenegro; Referees: Gubica, Milošević (CRO)
14 March 2021; 17:30	Dutra 5	(11–17)	Er. Feuchtmann 8	Verde Complex, Podgorica, Montenegro; Referees: Gubica, Milošević (CRO)
14 March 2021; 17:30	2× (yellow card) 2× (suspension)	Report	2× (yellow card) 5× (suspension)	Verde Complex, Podgorica, Montenegro; Referees: Gubica, Milošević (CRO)

14 March 2021; 20:00	South Korea	31–44	Norway	Verde Complex, Podgorica, Montenegro; Referees: Horáček, Novotný (CZE)
14 March 2021; 20:00	Park K. 11	(16–24)	Jøndal, Myrhol 7	Verde Complex, Podgorica, Montenegro; Referees: Horáček, Novotný (CZE)
14 March 2021; 20:00	1× (yellow card) 2× (suspension)	Report	1× (yellow card) 5× (suspension)	Verde Complex, Podgorica, Montenegro; Referees: Horáček, Novotný (CZE)

== Tournament 2 ==
Tournament 2
Tournament details
- Host country: France
- Venue(s): 1 (in 1 host city)
- Dates: 12–14 March 2021
- Teams: 4 (from 2 confederations)

Tournament statistics
- Matches played: 6
- Goals scored: 349 (58.17 per match)
- Attendance: 0 (0 per match)
- Top scorer(s): (Croatia) Ivan Čupić (19 goals)

=== Standings ===
Pos	Team	Pld	W	D	L	GF	GA	GD	Pts	Qualification
1	France (H)	3	2	0	1	98	84	+14	4 (Note: France 2 Pts, +3 GD; Portugal 2 Pts, 0 GD; Croatia 2 Pts, –3 GD)	2020 Summer Olympics
2	Portugal	3	2	0	1	87	80	+7	4	2020 Summer Olympics
3	Croatia	3	2	0	1	81	81	0	4	
4	Tunisia	3	0	0	3	83	104	−21	0	

Source: IHF
Rules for classification: 1) Points; 2) Head-to-head points; 3) Head-to-head goal difference; 4) Head-to-head goals scored; 5) Goal difference; 6) Goals scored; 7) Draw.
(H) Hosts

=== Matches ===
All times are local (UTC+1).

12 March 2021; 18:30	Tunisia	27–34	Portugal	Sud de France Arena, Montpellier; Referees: Brunner, Salah (SUI)
12 March 2021; 18:30	Boughanmi 5	(11–15)	Gomes 7	Sud de France Arena, Montpellier; Referees: Brunner, Salah (SUI)
12 March 2021; 18:30	1× (yellow card) 4× (suspension)	Report	1× (yellow card) 6× (suspension)	Sud de France Arena, Montpellier; Referees: Brunner, Salah (SUI)

12 March 2021; 21:00	France	30–26	Croatia	Sud de France Arena, Montpellier; Referees: Schulze, Tönnies (GER)
12 March 2021; 21:00	Mahé, Mem 5	(12–15)	Čupić 10	Sud de France Arena, Montpellier; Referees: Schulze, Tönnies (GER)
12 March 2021; 21:00	2× (yellow card) 4× (suspension)	Report	2× (yellow card) 4× (suspension)	Sud de France Arena, Montpellier; Referees: Schulze, Tönnies (GER)

13 March 2021; 18:30	Croatia	25–24	Portugal	Sud de France Arena, Montpellier; Referees: Kurtagic, Wetterwik (SWE)
13 March 2021; 18:30	Čupić 9	(9–12)	Iturriza 5	Sud de France Arena, Montpellier; Referees: Kurtagic, Wetterwik (SWE)
13 March 2021; 18:30	2× (yellow card) 2× (suspension)	Report	3× (suspension)	Sud de France Arena, Montpellier; Referees: Kurtagic, Wetterwik (SWE)

13 March 2021; 21:00	France	40–29	Tunisia	Sud de France Arena, Montpellier; Referees: Bíró, Kiss (HUN)
13 March 2021; 21:00	Descat 6	(21–13)	Rzig 6	Sud de France Arena, Montpellier; Referees: Bíró, Kiss (HUN)
13 March 2021; 21:00	1× (suspension)	Report	1× (yellow card) 6× (suspension)	Sud de France Arena, Montpellier; Referees: Bíró, Kiss (HUN)

14 March 2021; 18:30	Croatia	30–27	Tunisia	Sud de France Arena, Montpellier; Referees: Brunner, Salah (SUI)
14 March 2021; 18:30	Mandić 9	(14–13)	Boughanmi 6	Sud de France Arena, Montpellier; Referees: Brunner, Salah (SUI)
14 March 2021; 18:30	1× (yellow card) 4× (suspension)	Report	1× (yellow card) 2× (suspension)	Sud de France Arena, Montpellier; Referees: Brunner, Salah (SUI)

14 March 2021; 21:00	Portugal	29–28	France	Sud de France Arena, Montpellier; Referees: Schulze, Tönnies (GER)
14 March 2021; 21:00	Areia 6	(12–13)	Descat 6	Sud de France Arena, Montpellier; Referees: Schulze, Tönnies (GER)
14 March 2021; 21:00	1× (yellow card) 2× (suspension)	Report	1× (yellow card) 5× (suspension)	Sud de France Arena, Montpellier; Referees: Schulze, Tönnies (GER)

== Tournament 3 ==
Tournament 3
Tournament details
- Host country: Germany
- Venue(s): 1 (in 1 host city)
- Dates: 12–14 March 2021
- Teams: 4 (from 2 confederations)

Tournament statistics
- Matches played: 6
- Goals scored: 355 (59.17 per match)
- Attendance: 0 (0 per match)
- Top scorer(s): (Germany) Julius Kühn (16 goals)

=== Standings ===
Pos	Team	Pld	W	D	L	GF	GA	GD	Pts	Qualification
1	Sweden	3	2	1	0	93	75	+18	5 (Note: Germany 25–25 Sweden)	2020 Summer Olympics
2	Germany (H)	3	2	1	0	95	78	+17	5	2020 Summer Olympics
3	Slovenia	3	1	0	2	88	96	−8	2	
4	Algeria	3	0	0	3	79	106	−27	0	

Source: IHF
Rules for classification: 1) Points; 2) Head-to-head points; 3) Head-to-head goal difference; 4) Head-to-head goals scored; 5) Goal difference; 6) Goals scored; 7) Draw.
(H) Hosts

=== Matches ===
All times are local (UTC+1).

12 March 2021; 15:15	Germany	25–25	Sweden	Max-Schmeling-Halle, Berlin; Referees: Nachevski, Nikolov (MKD)
12 March 2021; 15:15	Schiller 5	(14–13)	Lagergren 7	Max-Schmeling-Halle, Berlin; Referees: Nachevski, Nikolov (MKD)
12 March 2021; 15:15	1× (yellow card) 4× (suspension)	Report	7× (suspension)	Max-Schmeling-Halle, Berlin; Referees: Nachevski, Nikolov (MKD)

12 March 2021; 17:45	Slovenia	36–28	Algeria	Max-Schmeling-Halle, Berlin; Referees: Grillo, Lenci (ARG)
12 March 2021; 17:45	Gajić 6	(17–11)	Berkous 9	Max-Schmeling-Halle, Berlin; Referees: Grillo, Lenci (ARG)
12 March 2021; 17:45	4× (suspension)	Report	1× (yellow card) 2× (suspension) 1× (red card)	Max-Schmeling-Halle, Berlin; Referees: Grillo, Lenci (ARG)

13 March 2021; 15:35	Germany	36–27	Slovenia	Max-Schmeling-Halle, Berlin; Referees: Raluy, Sabroso (ESP)
13 March 2021; 15:35	Schiller 7	(22–12)	Blagotinšek 5	Max-Schmeling-Halle, Berlin; Referees: Raluy, Sabroso (ESP)
13 March 2021; 15:35	1× (yellow card) 3× (suspension)	Report	1× (yellow card) 4× (suspension)	Max-Schmeling-Halle, Berlin; Referees: Raluy, Sabroso (ESP)

13 March 2021; 18:00	Sweden	36–25	Algeria	Max-Schmeling-Halle, Berlin; Referees: Nachevski, Nikolov (MKD)
13 March 2021; 18:00	Ekberg, Mellegård 6	(19–10)	Abdi, Naim 5	Max-Schmeling-Halle, Berlin; Referees: Nachevski, Nikolov (MKD)
13 March 2021; 18:00	3× (suspension)	Report	6× (suspension)	Max-Schmeling-Halle, Berlin; Referees: Nachevski, Nikolov (MKD)

14 March 2021; 15:45	Algeria	26–34	Germany	Max-Schmeling-Halle, Berlin; Referees: Hansen, Madsen (DEN)
14 March 2021; 15:45	Naim 9	(14–17)	Kühn 8	Max-Schmeling-Halle, Berlin; Referees: Hansen, Madsen (DEN)
14 March 2021; 15:45	1× (yellow card) 5× (suspension) 1× (red card)	Report	1× (suspension)	Max-Schmeling-Halle, Berlin; Referees: Hansen, Madsen (DEN)

14 March 2021; 18:15	Sweden	32–25	Slovenia	Max-Schmeling-Halle, Berlin; Referees: Raluy, Sabroso (ESP)
14 March 2021; 18:15	Ekberg 7	(17–13)	three players 5	Max-Schmeling-Halle, Berlin; Referees: Raluy, Sabroso (ESP)
14 March 2021; 18:15	3× (suspension)	Report	1× (yellow card) 7× (suspension)	Max-Schmeling-Halle, Berlin; Referees: Raluy, Sabroso (ESP)

== See also ==
- 2020 IHF Women's Olympic Qualification Tournaments
