= Olga Fomina =

Russian handball player

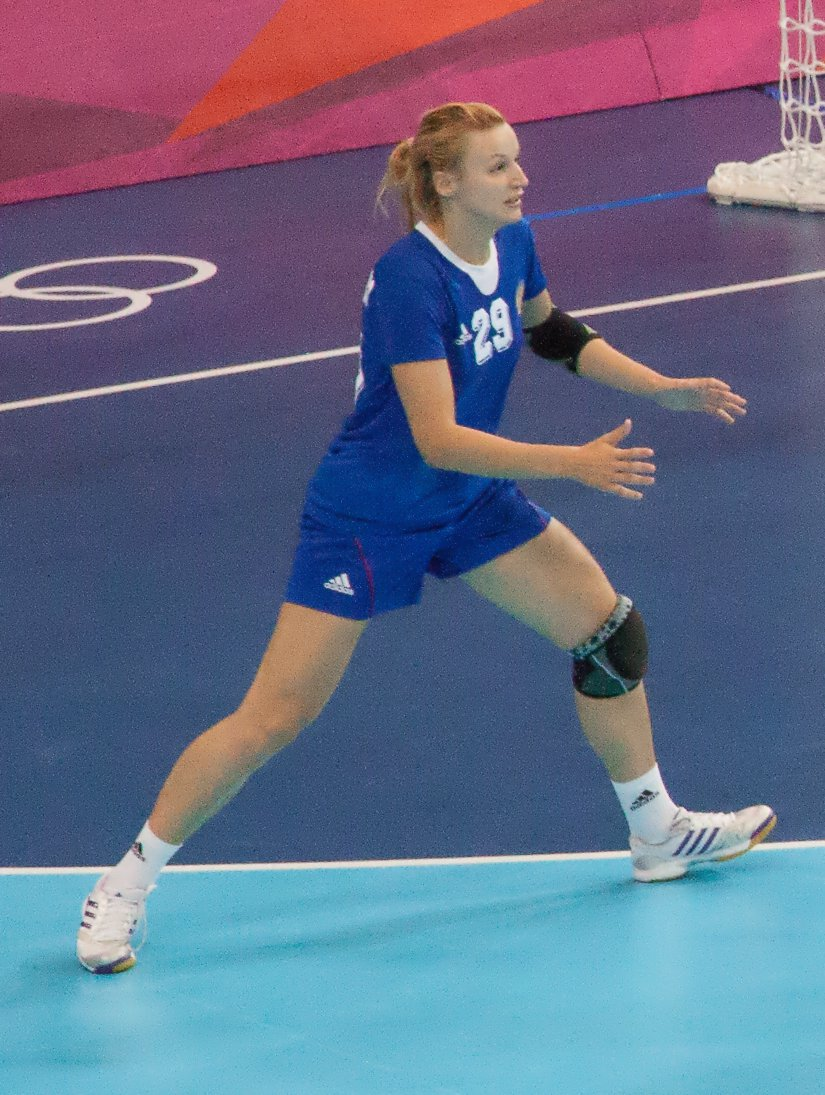
- Fomina in 2012

Personal information
- Nationality: Russian
- Born: 17 April 1989 (age 37) Samara, Russia
- Height: 1.75 m (5 ft 9 in)

Sport
- Sport: Handball
- Position: Right wing
- Current club: HC Lada
- Number: 2

Senior clubs
- Years: Team
- 2006–2014: HC Lada
- 2014–2016: HC Vardar
- 2016–2017: Rostov-Don
- 2019–: HC Lada
National team
Years	Team	Apps	(Gls)
2010–	Russia	135	(276)
Medal record
Representing ROC
Olympic Games
Silver medal – second place	2020 Tokyo	Team
Representing Russia
World Championship
Bronze medal – third place	2019 Japan	Team

Olga Igorevna Fomina (Russian: Ольга Игоревна Фомина, IPA: [ˈolʲɡə fəmʲɪˈna], née Chernoivanenko; born 17 April 1989) is a Russian handball player for HC Lada and the Russian national team.

She has played on the Russian national team and participated in the 2011 World Women's Handball Championship in Brazil and the 2012 Summer Olympics.
