= Sim Hae-in =

South Korean handball player (born 1987)

Personal information
- Nationality: South Korean
- Born: 31 October 1987 (age 38) Seoul, South Korea
- Height: 1.78 m (5 ft 10 in)

Sport
- Sport: Handball
- Position: Left back

Senior clubs
- Years: Team
- –: Busan
- –: Seoul City
National team
Years	Team	Apps	(Gls)
–	South Korea	64	(117)
Medal record
Asian Championship
Gold medal – first place	2018 Japan

Korean name
- Hangul: 심해인
- Hanja: 沈解寅
- RR: Sim Haein
- MR: Sim Haein
- Updated on 2 December 2017

Sim Hae-in (born 31 October 1987) is a Korean handball player for Busan and the South Korean national team.

She participated at the 2011 World Women's Handball Championship in Brazil and the 2012 Summer Olympics. She also participated in the 2017 World Women's Handball Championship.
