= Vilde Johansen =

Norwegian handball player (born 1994)

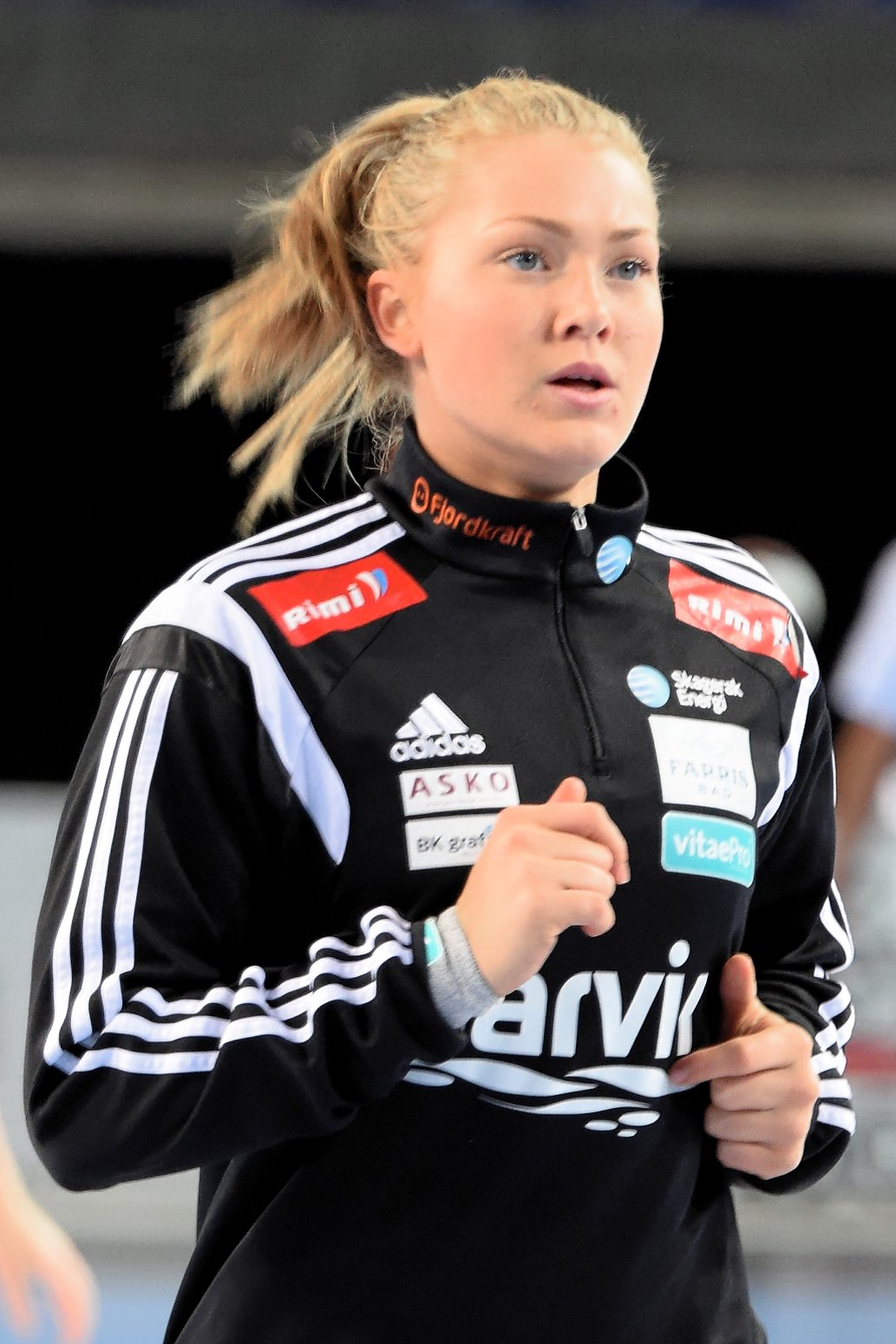
- Johansen in 2014

Personal information
- Full name: Vilde Ingeborg Johansen
- Nationality: Norwegian
- Born: 25 July 1994 (age 32) Tønsberg, Norway
- Height: 1.82 m (6 ft 0 in)

Sport
- Sport: Handball
- Position: Pivot

Senior clubs
- Years: Team
- 2010–2013: Runar IL
- 2013–2017: Larvik HK
- 2017–2019: Tertnes HE
- 2019–2023: Ikast Håndbold
National team
Years	Team	Apps	(Gls)
2015–2021	Norway	13	(2)
Medal record
Olympic Games
Bronze medal – third place	2020 Tokyo	Team

Vilde Johansen (born 25 July 1994) is a former Norwegian handball player who last played for Ikast Håndbold.

She made her debut for Norway women's national handball team on 24 July 2015, against Russia.

== Achievements ==
- Olympic Games:
  - Bronze: 2020
- Norwegian Championship:
  - Winner: 2013/2014, 2014/2015, 2015/2016 (Larvik)
  - Bronze medalist: 2018/2019 (Tertnes)
- Norwegian Cup:
  - Winner: 2013, 2014, 2015, 2016
- Danish Cup:
  - Winner: 2019
- EHF European League:
  - Winner: 2023

== Individual awards ==
- All-Star Line Player of Eliteserien: 2018/2019
