= Þjóðfundur =

Þjóðfundur may refer to:

- Þjóðfundur 2009, the National Assembly of 2009
- Þjóðfundur 1851, the National Assembly of 1851
