= 2008 European Men's Handball Championship =

2008 edition of the European Men's Handball Championship

2008 EHF European Men's Handball Championship
Håndball-EM 2008. (in Norwegian)

Tournament details
- Host country: Norway
- Venues: 5 (in 5 host cities)
- Dates: 17–27 January
- Teams: 16 (from 1 confederation)

Final positions
- Champions: Denmark (1st title)
- Runners-up: Croatia
- Third place: France
- Fourth place: Germany

Tournament statistics
- Matches played: 47
- Goals scored: 2,643 (56.23 per match)
- Attendance: 165,150 (3,514 per match)
- Top scorers: (Croatia) Ivano Balić (Denmark) Lars Christiansen (France) Nikola Karabatić (44 goals)

Awards
- Best player: (France) Nikola Karabatić

The 2008 EHF European Men's Handball Championship (8th tournament) was held in Norway from 17 to 27 January, in the cities of Bergen, Drammen, Lillehammer, Stavanger and Trondheim. Denmark won the tournament with Croatia second and France third. This was the first time Denmark won a major international tournament.

== Venues ==
Drammen	Stavanger	2008 European Men's Handball Championship is located in Norway
Drammenshallen; Capacity: 4,000	Stavanger Idrettshall; Capacity: 7,000	2008 European Men's Handball Championship is located in Norway
Bergen	Trondheim	2008 European Men's Handball Championship is located in Norway
Haukelandshallen; Capacity: 4,000	Trondheim Spektrum; Capacity: 4,000	2008 European Men's Handball Championship is located in Norway
Lillehammer		2008 European Men's Handball Championship is located in Norway
Håkons Hall; Capacity: 10,500		2008 European Men's Handball Championship is located in Norway

== Qualification ==
Qualification matches took place in 2007. According to the EHF rules, the host (Norway) and the top six nations from the 2006 European Championship (France, Croatia, Spain, Denmark, Germany, Russia) were automatically qualified. The other nine places were determined after the play-off matches, held in June; nine teams were seeded, after qualifying for the 2006 Championship, while their opponents qualified through the preliminary group stages.

=== Qualified teams ===
Country	Qualified as	Previous appearances in tournament
Norway	Host	2 (2000, 2006)
Croatia	Semifinalist of 2006 European Championship	7 (1994, 1996, 1998, 2000, 2002, 2004, 2006)
Denmark	Semifinalist of 2006 European Championship	6 (1994, 1996, 2000, 2002, 2004, 2006)
France	Semifinalist of 2006 European Championship	7 (1994, 1996, 1998, 2000, 2002, 2004, **2006**)
Spain	Semifinalist of 2006 European Championship	7 (1994, 1996, 1998, 2000, 2002, 2004, 2006)
Germany	Fifth place of 2006 European Championship	7 (1994, 1996, 1998, 2000, 2002, **2004**, 2006)
Russia	Sixth place of 2006 European Championship	7 (1994, **1996**, 1998, 2000, 2002, 2004, 2006)
Belarus	Playoff winner	1 (1994)
Czech Republic	Playoff winner	4 (1996, 1998, 2002, 2004)
Hungary	Playoff winner	5 (1994, 1996, 1998, 2004, 2006)
Iceland	Playoff winner	4 (2000, 2002, 2004, 2006)
Montenegro	Playoff winner	0 (Debut)
Poland	Playoff winner	3 (2002, 2004, 2006)
Slovakia	Playoff winner	1 (2006)
Slovenia	Playoff winner	6 (1994, 1996, 2000, 2002, 2004, 2006)
Sweden	Playoff winner	6 (**1994**, 1996, **1998**, **2000**, **2002**, 2004)

Note: Bold indicates champion for that year. Italic indicates host for that year.

== Draw ==
The draw was held on 22 June 2007 in the TV2 Studio in Oslo.

=== Seeding ===
The seedings were announced on 19 June 2007.

Pot 1	Pot 2	Pot 3	Pot 4
France; Spain; Denmark; Croatia	Germany; Russia; Iceland; Slovenia	Poland; Norway; Slovakia; Hungary	Belarus; Montenegro; Sweden; Czech Republic

== Preliminary round ==
All times are local (UTC+1).

=== Group A ===
Pos	Team	Pld	W	D	L	GF	GA	GD	Pts	Qualification
1	Croatia	3	3	0	0	91	77	+14	6	Main round
2	Poland	3	2	0	1	93	89	+4	4	Main round
3	Slovenia	3	1	0	2	85	94	−9	2	Main round
4	Czech Republic	3	0	0	3	88	97	−9	0	

Source: EHF
Rules for classification: 1) points; 2) head-to-head points; 3) head-to-head goal difference; 4) head-to-head number of goals scored; 5) goal difference.

17 January 2008; 18:15	Slovenia	34–32	Czech Republic	Stavanger Idrettshall, Stavanger; Attendance: 1,000; Referees: Lemme, Ullrich (GER)
17 January 2008; 18:15	Kavtičnik 12	(16–14)	Filip 10	Stavanger Idrettshall, Stavanger; Attendance: 1,000; Referees: Lemme, Ullrich (GER)
17 January 2008; 18:15	3× (yellow card) 8× (suspension) 1× (red card)	Report	3× (yellow card) 8× (suspension)	Stavanger Idrettshall, Stavanger; Attendance: 1,000; Referees: Lemme, Ullrich (GER)

17 January 2008; 20:15	Croatia	32–27	Poland	Stavanger Idrettshall, Stavanger; Attendance: 1,000; Referees: Breto, Huelin (ESP)
17 January 2008; 20:15	Balić, Horvat 7	(14–14)	Jurasik 11	Stavanger Idrettshall, Stavanger; Attendance: 1,000; Referees: Breto, Huelin (ESP)
17 January 2008; 20:15	2× (yellow card) 3× (suspension)	Report	3× (yellow card) 7× (suspension) 1× (red card)	Stavanger Idrettshall, Stavanger; Attendance: 1,000; Referees: Breto, Huelin (ESP)

18 January 2008; 18:15	Czech Republic	26–30	Croatia	Stavanger Idrettshall, Stavanger; Attendance: 1,200; Referees: Vakula, Ljudovik (UKR)
18 January 2008; 18:15	Vítek 7	(13–13)	Balić 6	Stavanger Idrettshall, Stavanger; Attendance: 1,200; Referees: Vakula, Ljudovik (UKR)
18 January 2008; 18:15	3× (yellow card) 10× (suspension) 1× (red card)	Report	3× (yellow card) 4× (suspension)	Stavanger Idrettshall, Stavanger; Attendance: 1,200; Referees: Vakula, Ljudovik (UKR)

18 January 2008; 20:15	Poland	33–27	Slovenia	Stavanger Idrettshall, Stavanger; Attendance: 2,655; Referees: Breto, Huelin (ESP)
18 January 2008; 20:15	Bielecki 9	(23–14)	Pajovič 7	Stavanger Idrettshall, Stavanger; Attendance: 2,655; Referees: Breto, Huelin (ESP)
18 January 2008; 20:15	3× (yellow card) 7× (suspension) 1× (red card)	Report	2× (yellow card) 6× (suspension)	Stavanger Idrettshall, Stavanger; Attendance: 2,655; Referees: Breto, Huelin (ESP)

20 January 2008; 15:15	Poland	33–30	Czech Republic	Stavanger Idrettshall, Stavanger; Attendance: 2,000; Referees: Bejenariu, Cirligeanu (ROU)
20 January 2008; 15:15	Bielecki 9	(13–14)	Nocar 7	Stavanger Idrettshall, Stavanger; Attendance: 2,000; Referees: Bejenariu, Cirligeanu (ROU)
20 January 2008; 15:15	3× (yellow card) 5× (suspension)	Report	3× (yellow card) 10× (suspension)	Stavanger Idrettshall, Stavanger; Attendance: 2,000; Referees: Bejenariu, Cirligeanu (ROU)

20 January 2008; 17:15	Croatia	29–24	Slovenia	Stavanger Idrettshall, Stavanger; Attendance: 2,500; Referees: Bord, Buy (FRA)
20 January 2008; 17:15	Balić 7	(16–15)	Pajovič 7	Stavanger Idrettshall, Stavanger; Attendance: 2,500; Referees: Bord, Buy (FRA)
20 January 2008; 17:15	2× (yellow card) 4× (suspension)	Report	4× (yellow card) 3× (suspension)	Stavanger Idrettshall, Stavanger; Attendance: 2,500; Referees: Bord, Buy (FRA)

=== Group B ===
Pos	Team	Pld	W	D	L	GF	GA	GD	Pts	Qualification
1	Norway (H)	3	3	0	0	86	69	+17	6	Main round
2	Denmark	3	2	0	1	89	79	+10	4	Main round
3	Montenegro	3	0	1	2	71	84	−13	1 (Note: Russia 25–25 Montenegro)	Main round
4	Russia	3	0	1	2	74	88	−14	1	

Source: EHF
Rules for classification: 1) points; 2) head-to-head points; 3) head-to-head goal difference; 4) head-to-head number of goals scored; 5) goal difference.
(H) Hosts
Notes:

17 January 2008; 17:00	Russia	25–25	Montenegro	Drammenshallen, Drammen; Attendance: 4,000; Referees: Canbro, Claesson (SWE)
17 January 2008; 17:00	Koksharov 8	(15–16)	Mrvaljević, Muratović 7	Drammenshallen, Drammen; Attendance: 4,000; Referees: Canbro, Claesson (SWE)
17 January 2008; 17:00	2× (yellow card) 6× (suspension)	Report	3× (yellow card) 6× (suspension)	Drammenshallen, Drammen; Attendance: 4,000; Referees: Canbro, Claesson (SWE)

17 January 2008; 19:15	Denmark	26–27	Norway	Drammenshallen, Drammen; Attendance: 4,700; Referees: Vakula, Ljudovik (UKR)
17 January 2008; 19:15	Boesen 9	(10–14)	Tvedten 8	Drammenshallen, Drammen; Attendance: 4,700; Referees: Vakula, Ljudovik (UKR)
17 January 2008; 19:15	3× (yellow card) 5× (suspension)	Report	3× (yellow card) 6× (suspension)	Drammenshallen, Drammen; Attendance: 4,700; Referees: Vakula, Ljudovik (UKR)

18 January 2008; 18:15	Norway	32–21	Russia	Drammenshallen, Drammen; Attendance: 4,650; Referees: Bord, Buy (FRA)
18 January 2008; 18:15	Hagen 9	(15–10)	Starykh 5	Drammenshallen, Drammen; Attendance: 4,650; Referees: Bord, Buy (FRA)
18 January 2008; 18:15	3× (yellow card) 2× (suspension)	Report	3× (yellow card) 5× (suspension)	Drammenshallen, Drammen; Attendance: 4,650; Referees: Bord, Buy (FRA)

18 January 2008; 20:15	Montenegro	24–32	Denmark	Drammenshallen, Drammen; Attendance: 2,100; Referees: Bejenariu, Cirligeanu (ROU)
18 January 2008; 20:15	Muratović 9	(9–18)	three players 5	Drammenshallen, Drammen; Attendance: 2,100; Referees: Bejenariu, Cirligeanu (ROU)
18 January 2008; 20:15	2× (yellow card) 5× (suspension)	Report	3× (yellow card) 5× (suspension)	Drammenshallen, Drammen; Attendance: 2,100; Referees: Bejenariu, Cirligeanu (ROU)

20 January 2008; 17:15	Denmark	31–28	Russia	Drammenshallen, Drammen; Attendance: 4,500; Referees: Lemme, Ullrich (GER)
20 January 2008; 17:15	Christiansen 13	(18–11)	Koksharov 6	Drammenshallen, Drammen; Attendance: 4,500; Referees: Lemme, Ullrich (GER)
20 January 2008; 17:15	3× (yellow card) 4× (suspension)	Report	3× (yellow card) 6× (suspension) 1× (red card)	Drammenshallen, Drammen; Attendance: 4,500; Referees: Lemme, Ullrich (GER)

20 January 2008; 19:15	Norway	27–22	Montenegro	Drammenshallen, Drammen; Attendance: 4,700; Referees: Breto, Huelin (ESP)
20 January 2008; 19:15	Tvedten 5	(16–11)	Muratović 8	Drammenshallen, Drammen; Attendance: 4,700; Referees: Breto, Huelin (ESP)
20 January 2008; 19:15	3× (yellow card) 5× (suspension) 1× (red card)	Report	3× (yellow card) 7× (suspension) 1× (red card)	Drammenshallen, Drammen; Attendance: 4,700; Referees: Breto, Huelin (ESP)

=== Group C ===
Pos	Team	Pld	W	D	L	GF	GA	GD	Pts	Qualification
1	Hungary	3	2	0	1	90	82	+8	4 (Note: Hungary 2 Pts, +3 GD; Spain 2 Pts, +1 GD; Germany 2 Pts, –4 GD)	Main round
2	Spain	3	2	0	1	94	88	+6	4	Main round
3	Germany	3	2	0	1	84	80	+4	4	Main round
4	Belarus	3	0	0	3	83	101	−18	0	

Source: EHF
Rules for classification: 1) points; 2) head-to-head points; 3) head-to-head goal difference; 4) head-to-head number of goals scored; 5) goal difference.
Notes:

17 January 2008; 17:15	Germany	34–26	Belarus	Haukelandshallen, Bergen; Attendance: 2,110; Referees: Abrahamsen, Kristiansen (NOR)
17 January 2008; 17:15	Baur 7	(16–13)	Pukhouski 10	Haukelandshallen, Bergen; Attendance: 2,110; Referees: Abrahamsen, Kristiansen (NOR)
17 January 2008; 17:15	3× (yellow card) 4× (suspension)	Report	3× (yellow card) 6× (suspension)	Haukelandshallen, Bergen; Attendance: 2,110; Referees: Abrahamsen, Kristiansen (NOR)

17 January 2008; 19:15	Spain	28–35	Hungary	Haukelandshallen, Bergen; Attendance: 2,130; Referees: Baum, Góralczyk (POL)
17 January 2008; 19:15	Garabaya 8	(12–14)	Ilyés, Nagy 7	Haukelandshallen, Bergen; Attendance: 2,130; Referees: Baum, Góralczyk (POL)
17 January 2008; 19:15	3× (yellow card) 1× (suspension)	Report	3× (yellow card) 3× (suspension)	Haukelandshallen, Bergen; Attendance: 2,130; Referees: Baum, Góralczyk (POL)

19 January 2008; 18:10	Hungary	24–28	Germany	Haukelandshallen, Bergen; Attendance: 2,340; Referees: Višekruna, Stanojević (SRB)
19 January 2008; 18:10	three players 4	(12–13)	Baur, Jansen 5	Haukelandshallen, Bergen; Attendance: 2,340; Referees: Višekruna, Stanojević (SRB)
19 January 2008; 18:10	3× (yellow card) 3× (suspension)	Report	3× (yellow card) 2× (suspension)	Haukelandshallen, Bergen; Attendance: 2,340; Referees: Višekruna, Stanojević (SRB)

19 January 2008; 20:15	Belarus	31–36	Spain	Haukelandshallen, Bergen; Attendance: 2,340; Referees: Olesen, Pedersen (DEN)
19 January 2008; 20:15	Pukhouski 8	(15–18)	Rocas 11	Haukelandshallen, Bergen; Attendance: 2,340; Referees: Olesen, Pedersen (DEN)
19 January 2008; 20:15	3× (yellow card) 4× (suspension) 1× (red card)	Report	3× (yellow card) 5× (suspension)	Haukelandshallen, Bergen; Attendance: 2,340; Referees: Olesen, Pedersen (DEN)

20 January 2008; 16:30	Spain	30–22	Germany	Haukelandshallen, Bergen; Attendance: 3,238; Referees: Poladenko, Chernega (RUS)
20 January 2008; 16:30	García 8	(12–12)	three players 4	Haukelandshallen, Bergen; Attendance: 3,238; Referees: Poladenko, Chernega (RUS)
20 January 2008; 16:30	3× (yellow card) 1× (suspension)	Report	3× (yellow card) 3× (suspension)	Haukelandshallen, Bergen; Attendance: 3,238; Referees: Poladenko, Chernega (RUS)

20 January 2008; 18:30	Hungary	31–26	Belarus	Haukelandshallen, Bergen; Attendance: 3,238; Referees: Reisinger, Kaschütz (AUT)
20 January 2008; 18:30	G. Iváncsik, Nagy 9	(18–16)	Kurchev 7	Haukelandshallen, Bergen; Attendance: 3,238; Referees: Reisinger, Kaschütz (AUT)
20 January 2008; 18:30	3× (yellow card) 3× (suspension)	Report	2× (yellow card) 4× (suspension)	Haukelandshallen, Bergen; Attendance: 3,238; Referees: Reisinger, Kaschütz (AUT)

=== Group D ===
Pos	Team	Pld	W	D	L	GF	GA	GD	Pts	Qualification
1	France	3	3	0	0	90	76	+14	6	Main round
2	Sweden	3	2	0	1	89	72	+17	4	Main round
3	Iceland	3	1	0	2	68	76	−8	2	Main round
4	Slovakia	3	0	0	3	78	101	−23	0	

Source: EHF
Rules for classification: 1) points; 2) head-to-head points; 3) head-to-head goal difference; 4) head-to-head number of goals scored; 5) goal difference.

17 January 2008; 18:15	France	32–31	Slovakia	Trondheim Spektrum, Trondheim; Attendance: 2,585; Referees: Višekruna, Stanojević (SRB)
17 January 2008; 18:15	Girault 6	(20–18)	Šulc 10	Trondheim Spektrum, Trondheim; Attendance: 2,585; Referees: Višekruna, Stanojević (SRB)
17 January 2008; 18:15	3× (yellow card) 4× (suspension)	Report	3× (yellow card) 6× (suspension)	Trondheim Spektrum, Trondheim; Attendance: 2,585; Referees: Višekruna, Stanojević (SRB)

17 January 2008; 20:15	Iceland	19–24	Sweden	Trondheim Spektrum, Trondheim; Attendance: 2,930; Referees: Olesen, Pedersen (DEN)
17 January 2008; 20:15	G. Sigurðsson, Stefánsson 4	(9–11)	Jurasik 11	Trondheim Spektrum, Trondheim; Attendance: 2,930; Referees: Olesen, Pedersen (DEN)
17 January 2008; 20:15	3× (yellow card) 2× (suspension)	Report	3× (yellow card) 7× (suspension)	Trondheim Spektrum, Trondheim; Attendance: 2,930; Referees: Olesen, Pedersen (DEN)

19 January 2008; 18:15	Slovakia	22–28	Iceland	Trondheim Spektrum, Trondheim; Attendance: 3,410; Referees: Reisinger, Kaschütz (AUT)
19 January 2008; 18:15	Kozlov 7	(5–16)	G. Sigurðsson 7	Trondheim Spektrum, Trondheim; Attendance: 3,410; Referees: Reisinger, Kaschütz (AUT)
19 January 2008; 18:15	3× (yellow card) 7× (suspension)	Report	2× (yellow card) 6× (suspension)	Trondheim Spektrum, Trondheim; Attendance: 3,410; Referees: Reisinger, Kaschütz (AUT)

19 January 2008; 20:15	Sweden	24–28	France	Trondheim Spektrum, Trondheim; Attendance: 3,640; Referees: Poladenko, Chernega (RUS)
19 January 2008; 20:15	three players 4	(13–18)	three players 5	Trondheim Spektrum, Trondheim; Attendance: 3,640; Referees: Poladenko, Chernega (RUS)
19 January 2008; 20:15	4× (yellow card) 2× (suspension)	Report	2× (yellow card) 3× (suspension)	Trondheim Spektrum, Trondheim; Attendance: 3,640; Referees: Poladenko, Chernega (RUS)

20 January 2008; 16:15	Slovakia	25–41	Sweden	Trondheim Spektrum, Trondheim; Attendance: 1,870; Referees: Abrahamsen, Kristiansen (NOR)
20 January 2008; 16:15	Dudáš, Mikéci 4	(12–20)	Andersson 8	Trondheim Spektrum, Trondheim; Attendance: 1,870; Referees: Abrahamsen, Kristiansen (NOR)
20 January 2008; 16:15	3× (yellow card) 4× (suspension)	Report	3× (yellow card) 3× (suspension)	Trondheim Spektrum, Trondheim; Attendance: 1,870; Referees: Abrahamsen, Kristiansen (NOR)

20 January 2008; 18:15	France	30–21	Iceland	Trondheim Spektrum, Trondheim; Attendance: 2,335; Referees: Baum, Góralczyk (POL)
20 January 2008; 18:15	Karabatić 10	(17–8)	Petersson 5	Trondheim Spektrum, Trondheim; Attendance: 2,335; Referees: Baum, Góralczyk (POL)
20 January 2008; 18:15	3× (yellow card) 4× (suspension) 1× (red card)	Report	3× (yellow card) 2× (suspension)	Trondheim Spektrum, Trondheim; Attendance: 2,335; Referees: Baum, Góralczyk (POL)

== Main round ==
=== Group I ===
Pos	Team	Pld	W	D	L	GF	GA	GD	Pts	Qualification
1	Denmark	5	4	0	1	152	120	+32	8	Semifinals
2	Croatia	5	3	1	1	138	130	+8	7	Semifinals
3	Norway (H)	5	2	2	1	130	128	+2	6	Fifth place game
4	Poland	5	2	1	2	149	142	+7	5	
5	Slovenia	5	2	0	3	138	148	−10	4	
6	Montenegro	5	0	0	5	124	163	−39	0	

Source: EHF
Rules for classification: 1) points; 2) head-to-head points; 3) head-to-head goal difference; 4) head-to-head number of goals scored; 5) goal difference.
(H) Hosts

22 January 2008; 16:15	Slovenia	31–29	Montenegro	Stavanger Idrettshall, Stavanger; Attendance: 2,815; Referees: Canbro, Claesson (SWE)
22 January 2008; 16:15	Pajovič 9	(16–13)	Mrvaljević 5	Stavanger Idrettshall, Stavanger; Attendance: 2,815; Referees: Canbro, Claesson (SWE)
22 January 2008; 16:15	2× (yellow card) 3× (suspension)	Report	3× (yellow card) 4× (suspension)	Stavanger Idrettshall, Stavanger; Attendance: 2,815; Referees: Canbro, Claesson (SWE)

22 January 2008; 18:15	Croatia	20–30	Denmark	Stavanger Idrettshall, Stavanger; Attendance: 4,601; Referees: Lemme, Ullrich (GER)
22 January 2008; 18:15	Horvat 5	(9–15)	Lindberg 7	Stavanger Idrettshall, Stavanger; Attendance: 4,601; Referees: Lemme, Ullrich (GER)
22 January 2008; 18:15	3× (yellow card) 3× (suspension)	Report	3× (yellow card) 5× (suspension) 1× (red card)	Stavanger Idrettshall, Stavanger; Attendance: 4,601; Referees: Lemme, Ullrich (GER)

22 January 2008; 20:15	Poland	24–24	Norway	Stavanger Idrettshall, Stavanger; Attendance: 7,000; Referees: Bord, Buy (FRA)
22 January 2008; 20:15	Lijewski 8	(12–13)	Strand 9	Stavanger Idrettshall, Stavanger; Attendance: 7,000; Referees: Bord, Buy (FRA)
22 January 2008; 20:15	4× (yellow card) 7× (suspension) 2× (red card)	Report	3× (yellow card) 9× (suspension) 2× (red card)	Stavanger Idrettshall, Stavanger; Attendance: 7,000; Referees: Bord, Buy (FRA)

23 January 2008; 16:15	Croatia	34–26	Montenegro	Stavanger Idrettshall, Stavanger; Attendance: 2,745; Referees: Breto, Huelin (ESP)
23 January 2008; 16:15	Vori 9	(12–13)	Kapisoda 7	Stavanger Idrettshall, Stavanger; Attendance: 2,745; Referees: Breto, Huelin (ESP)
23 January 2008; 16:15	2× (yellow card) 1× (suspension)	Report	3× (yellow card) 2× (suspension)	Stavanger Idrettshall, Stavanger; Attendance: 2,745; Referees: Breto, Huelin (ESP)

23 January 2008; 18:15	Poland	26–36	Denmark	Stavanger Idrettshall, Stavanger; Attendance: 4,757; Referees: Vakula, Ljudovik (UKR)
23 January 2008; 18:15	Jurasik 7	(13–17)	Boesen 8	Stavanger Idrettshall, Stavanger; Attendance: 4,757; Referees: Vakula, Ljudovik (UKR)
23 January 2008; 18:15	3× (yellow card) 5× (suspension)	Report	3× (yellow card) 5× (suspension)	Stavanger Idrettshall, Stavanger; Attendance: 4,757; Referees: Vakula, Ljudovik (UKR)

23 January 2008; 20:15	Slovenia	33–29	Norway	Stavanger Idrettshall, Stavanger; Attendance: 6,869; Referees: Bejenariu, Cirligeanu (ROU)
23 January 2008; 20:15	Natek 9	(14–13)	Kjelling, Loke 7	Stavanger Idrettshall, Stavanger; Attendance: 6,869; Referees: Bejenariu, Cirligeanu (ROU)
23 January 2008; 20:15	3× (yellow card) 6× (suspension)	Report	3× (yellow card) 3× (suspension)	Stavanger Idrettshall, Stavanger; Attendance: 6,869; Referees: Bejenariu, Cirligeanu (ROU)

24 January 2008; 16:15	Poland	39–23	Montenegro	Stavanger Idrettshall, Stavanger; Attendance: 2,309; Referees: Canbro, Claesson (SWE)
24 January 2008; 16:15	Jachlewski 6	(19–13)	Kapisoda 6	Stavanger Idrettshall, Stavanger; Attendance: 2,309; Referees: Canbro, Claesson (SWE)
24 January 2008; 16:15	3× (yellow card) 4× (suspension)	Report	3× (yellow card) 3× (suspension)	Stavanger Idrettshall, Stavanger; Attendance: 2,309; Referees: Canbro, Claesson (SWE)

24 January 2008; 18:15	Slovenia	23–28	Denmark	Stavanger Idrettshall, Stavanger; Attendance: 6,412; Referees: Lemme, Ullrich (GER)
24 January 2008; 18:15	Natek 5	(11–15)	Christiansen 8	Stavanger Idrettshall, Stavanger; Attendance: 6,412; Referees: Lemme, Ullrich (GER)
24 January 2008; 18:15	4× (yellow card) 4× (suspension)	Report	2× (yellow card) 3× (suspension)	Stavanger Idrettshall, Stavanger; Attendance: 6,412; Referees: Lemme, Ullrich (GER)

24 January 2008; 20:15	Croatia	23–23	Norway	Stavanger Idrettshall, Stavanger; Attendance: 7,000; Referees: Breto, Huelin (ESP)
24 January 2008; 20:15	Balić 9	(10–11)	three players 5	Stavanger Idrettshall, Stavanger; Attendance: 7,000; Referees: Breto, Huelin (ESP)
24 January 2008; 20:15	4× (yellow card) 5× (suspension)	Report	4× (yellow card) 2× (suspension)	Stavanger Idrettshall, Stavanger; Attendance: 7,000; Referees: Breto, Huelin (ESP)

=== Group II ===
Pos	Team	Pld	W	D	L	GF	GA	GD	Pts	Qualification
1	France	5	4	0	1	140	126	+14	8	Semifinals
2	Germany	5	3	0	2	139	136	+3	6	Semifinals
3	Sweden	5	2	1	2	131	131	0	5 (Note: Sweden 27–27 Hungary)	Fifth place game
4	Hungary	5	2	1	2	145	147	−2	5	
5	Spain	5	2	0	3	144	138	+6	4	
6	Iceland	5	1	0	4	129	150	−21	2	

Source: EHF
Rules for classification: 1) points; 2) head-to-head points; 3) head-to-head goal difference; 4) head-to-head number of goals scored; 5) goal difference.
Notes:

22 January 2008; 16:20	Germany	35–27	Iceland	Trondheim Spektrum, Trondheim; Attendance: 1,380; Referees: Abrahamsen, Kristiansen (NOR)
22 January 2008; 16:20	Glandorf 9	(17–12)	Stefánsson 8	Trondheim Spektrum, Trondheim; Attendance: 1,380; Referees: Abrahamsen, Kristiansen (NOR)
22 January 2008; 16:20	3× (yellow card) 4× (suspension)	Report	3× (yellow card) 4× (suspension)	Trondheim Spektrum, Trondheim; Attendance: 1,380; Referees: Abrahamsen, Kristiansen (NOR)

22 January 2008; 18:30	Spain	27–28	France	Trondheim Spektrum, Trondheim; Attendance: 1,890; Referees: Olesen, Pedersen (DEN)
22 January 2008; 18:30	three players 5	(15–15)	Narcisse 7	Trondheim Spektrum, Trondheim; Attendance: 1,890; Referees: Olesen, Pedersen (DEN)
22 January 2008; 18:30	2× (yellow card) 2× (suspension)	Report	3× (yellow card) 3× (suspension)	Trondheim Spektrum, Trondheim; Attendance: 1,890; Referees: Olesen, Pedersen (DEN)

22 January 2008; 20:30	Hungary	27–27	Sweden	Trondheim Spektrum, Trondheim; Attendance: 1,103; Referees: Višekruna, Stanojević (SRB)
22 January 2008; 20:30	G. Iváncsik 8	(16–14)	Ahlm 8	Trondheim Spektrum, Trondheim; Attendance: 1,103; Referees: Višekruna, Stanojević (SRB)
22 January 2008; 20:30	3× (yellow card) 3× (suspension)	Report	3× (yellow card) 5× (suspension)	Trondheim Spektrum, Trondheim; Attendance: 1,103; Referees: Višekruna, Stanojević (SRB)

23 January 2008; 16:15	Spain	26–27	Sweden	Trondheim Spektrum, Trondheim; Attendance: 2,730; Referees: Baum, Góralczyk (POL)
23 January 2008; 16:15	García 8	(14–13)	Källman 8	Trondheim Spektrum, Trondheim; Attendance: 2,730; Referees: Baum, Góralczyk (POL)
23 January 2008; 16:15	3× (yellow card) 5× (suspension)	Report	3× (yellow card) 5× (suspension)	Trondheim Spektrum, Trondheim; Attendance: 2,730; Referees: Baum, Góralczyk (POL)

23 January 2008; 18:15	Germany	23–26	France	Trondheim Spektrum, Trondheim; Attendance: 2,945; Referees: Poladenko, Chernega (RUS)
23 January 2008; 18:15	Kraus 6	(10–11)	Karabatić 8	Trondheim Spektrum, Trondheim; Attendance: 2,945; Referees: Poladenko, Chernega (RUS)
23 January 2008; 18:15	3× (yellow card) 5× (suspension) 1× (red card)	Report	4× (yellow card) 2× (suspension)	Trondheim Spektrum, Trondheim; Attendance: 2,945; Referees: Poladenko, Chernega (RUS)

23 January 2008; 20:15	Hungary	28–36	Iceland	Trondheim Spektrum, Trondheim; Attendance: 1,012; Referees: Reisinger, Kaschütz (AUT)
23 January 2008; 20:15	Mocsai 6	(16–16)	Guðjónsson 11	Trondheim Spektrum, Trondheim; Attendance: 1,012; Referees: Reisinger, Kaschütz (AUT)
23 January 2008; 20:15	3× (yellow card) 4× (suspension)	Report	3× (yellow card) 3× (suspension) 1× (red card)	Trondheim Spektrum, Trondheim; Attendance: 1,012; Referees: Reisinger, Kaschütz (AUT)

24 January 2008; 15:20	Spain	33–26	Iceland	Trondheim Spektrum, Trondheim; Attendance: 2,280; Referees: Olesen, Pedersen (DEN)
24 January 2008; 15:20	García 9	(18–15)	Guðjónsson, G. Sigurðsson 7	Trondheim Spektrum, Trondheim; Attendance: 2,280; Referees: Olesen, Pedersen (DEN)
24 January 2008; 15:20	3× (yellow card) 4× (suspension)	Report	2× (yellow card) 4× (suspension) 1× (red card)	Trondheim Spektrum, Trondheim; Attendance: 2,280; Referees: Olesen, Pedersen (DEN)

24 January 2008; 17:20	Hungary	31–28	France	Trondheim Spektrum, Trondheim; Attendance: 2,360; Referees: Abrahamsen, Kristiansen (NOR)
24 January 2008; 17:20	Ilyés 9	(15–11)	Guilbert 6	Trondheim Spektrum, Trondheim; Attendance: 2,360; Referees: Abrahamsen, Kristiansen (NOR)
24 January 2008; 17:20	3× (yellow card) 5× (suspension)	Report	3× (yellow card) 3× (suspension)	Trondheim Spektrum, Trondheim; Attendance: 2,360; Referees: Abrahamsen, Kristiansen (NOR)

24 January 2008; 19:20	Germany	31–29	Sweden	Trondheim Spektrum, Trondheim; Attendance: 2,915; Referees: Višekruna, Stanojević (SRB)
24 January 2008; 19:20	Glandorf, Hens 7	(16–18)	Andersson 9	Trondheim Spektrum, Trondheim; Attendance: 2,915; Referees: Višekruna, Stanojević (SRB)
24 January 2008; 19:20	3× (yellow card) 5× (suspension)	Report	3× (yellow card) 3× (suspension)	Trondheim Spektrum, Trondheim; Attendance: 2,915; Referees: Višekruna, Stanojević (SRB)

== Final round ==
=== Bracket ===
Semifinals
26 January
Denmark	26
Germany	25
26 January
Croatia	24
France	23

Final
27 January
Denmark	24
Croatia	20
Third place
27 January
Germany	26
France	36

=== Semifinals ===
26 January 2008; 15:30	Croatia	24–23	France	Håkons Hall, Lillehammer; Attendance: 6,012; Referees: Baum, Góralczyk (POL)
26 January 2008; 15:30	Metličić 6	(11–9)	Abalo, Narcisse 7	Håkons Hall, Lillehammer; Attendance: 6,012; Referees: Baum, Góralczyk (POL)
26 January 2008; 15:30	4× (yellow card) 1× (suspension)	Report	4× (yellow card) 2× (suspension)	Håkons Hall, Lillehammer; Attendance: 6,012; Referees: Baum, Góralczyk (POL)

26 January 2008; 18:00	Denmark	26–25	Germany	Håkons Hall, Lillehammer; Attendance: 6,012; Referees: Poladenko, Chernega (RUS)
26 January 2008; 18:00	Christiansen 6	(10–13)	Kehrmann 6	Håkons Hall, Lillehammer; Attendance: 6,012; Referees: Poladenko, Chernega (RUS)
26 January 2008; 18:00	3× (yellow card) 2× (suspension)	Report	3× (yellow card) 4× (suspension)	Håkons Hall, Lillehammer; Attendance: 6,012; Referees: Poladenko, Chernega (RUS)

=== Fifth place game ===
26 January 2008
13:00
Norway
34–36 (ET)
Sweden
Håkons Hall, Lillehammer
Attendance: 5,840
Referees: Lemme, Ullrich (GER)
Strand 10
(13–15)
Boquist, Källman 7
3× (yellow card) 3× (suspension)
Report
3× (yellow card) 4× (suspension)

FT: 26–26 ET: 4–4, 4–6

=== Third place game ===
27 January 2008; 13:30	Germany	26–36	France	Håkons Hall, Lillehammer; Attendance: 7,940; Referees: Vakula, Liudovyk (UKR)
27 January 2008; 13:30	Jansen 7	(9–18)	Girault 8	Håkons Hall, Lillehammer; Attendance: 7,940; Referees: Vakula, Liudovyk (UKR)
27 January 2008; 13:30	3× (yellow card) 4× (suspension)	Report	3× (yellow card) 3× (suspension)	Håkons Hall, Lillehammer; Attendance: 7,940; Referees: Vakula, Liudovyk (UKR)

=== Final ===
27 January 2008; 16:00	Denmark	24–20	Croatia	Håkons Hall, Lillehammer; Attendance: 9,052; Referees: Breto, Huelin (ESP)
27 January 2008; 16:00	Boesen, Christiansen 7	(13–10)	Metličić 5	Håkons Hall, Lillehammer; Attendance: 9,052; Referees: Breto, Huelin (ESP)
27 January 2008; 16:00	2× (yellow card) 5× (suspension)	Report	4× (yellow card) 6× (suspension) 1× (red card)	Håkons Hall, Lillehammer; Attendance: 9,052; Referees: Breto, Huelin (ESP)

== Ranking and statistics ==
=== Final ranking ===
Gold medal	Denmark
Silver medal	Croatia
Bronze medal	France
4	Germany
5	Sweden
6	Norway
7	Poland
8	Hungary
9	Spain
10	Slovenia
11	Iceland
12	Montenegro
13	Russia
14	Czech Republic
15	Belarus
16	Slovakia

2008 Men's European Champions

Denmark
First Title

Team roster

Kasper Hvidt, Mikkel Holm Aagaard, Lasse Boesen, Lars T. Jørgensen, Jesper Jensen, Lars Rasmussen, Lars Christiansen, Lars Møller Madsen, Peter Henriksen, Bo Spellerberg, Michael V. Knudsen, Jesper Nøddesbo, Lars Krogh Jeppesen, Kasper Søndergaard, Joachim Boldsen, Hans Lindberg and Kasper Nielsen.
Head coach: Ulrik Wilbek.

=== All-Star Team ===
- Goalkeeper: Kasper Hvidt (DEN)
- Left wing: Lars Christiansen (DEN)
- Left back: Daniel Narcisse (FRA)
- Pivot: Frank Løke (NOR)
- Centre back: Ivano Balić (CRO)
- Right back: Kim Andersson (SWE)
- Right wing: Florian Kehrmann (GER)

Source: EHF Archived 20 October 2020 at the Wayback Machine

=== Other awards ===
- Most valuable player: Nikola Karabatić (FRA)
- Best Defence Player: Igor Vori (CRO)

=== Top goalscorers ===
Rank	Name	Team	Goals	Shots	%
1	Ivano Balić	Croatia	44	84	52
1	Lars Christiansen	Denmark	44	58	76
1	Nikola Karabatić	France	44	89	49
4	Daniel Narcisse	France	43	72	60
5	Kim Andersson	Sweden	41	78	53
5	Lasse Boesen	Denmark	41	76	54
7	Aleš Pajovič	Slovenia	39	70	56
8	Karol Bielecki	Poland	37	62	60
9	Holger Glandorf	Germany	36	72	50
10	Guðjón Valur Sigurðsson	Iceland	34	63	54

Source: EHF

=== Top goalkeepers ===
(minimum 20% of total shots received by team)

Rank	Name	Team	%	Saves	Shots
1	Kasper Hvidt	Denmark	40	124	307
2	Steinar Ege	Norway	39	104	264
3	Nándor Fazekas	Hungary	38	53	140
4	Beno Lapajne	Slovenia	37	55	148
5	Oleg Grams	Russia	35	9	26
5	José Javier Hombrados	Spain	35	71	203
5	Goran Stojanović	Montenegro	35	71	201
8	Mirko Alilović	Croatia	34	72	211
8	Johannes Bitter	Germany	34	59	176
8	Thierry Omeyer	France	34	77	229
8	Nenad Puljezević	Hungary	34	44	130
8	Gorazd Škof	Slovenia	34	45	132
8	Tomas Svensson	Sweden	34	49	143
