= Stavanger Idrettshall =

Indoor arena in Norway

Coordinates: 58°57′15″N 5°42′2″E

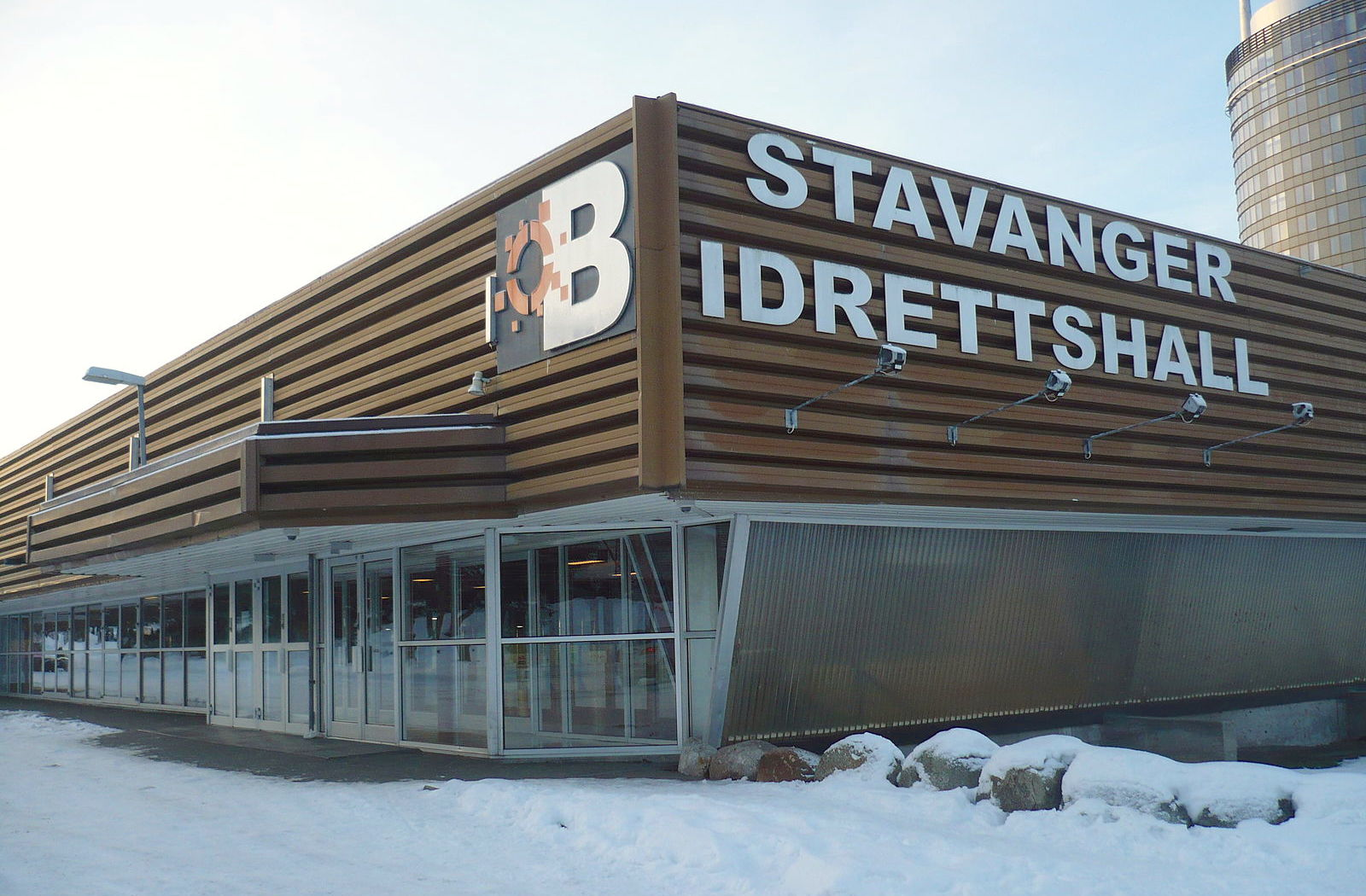
Stavanger Idrettshall

Stavanger Idrettshall is an indoor arena in Stavanger, Norway. It hosts the home games of the Stavanger handball team, and then has a capacity 4,100 people. This arena hosted the main stage of the 2008 European Men's Handball Championship. It was a proposed venue for the country's co-hosting of the 2025 World Men's Handball Championship with Croatia and Denmark.

== See also ==
- List of indoor arenas in Norway
- List of indoor arenas in Nordic countries
