= Haukelandshallen =

Sports hall in Årstad, Bergen, Norway

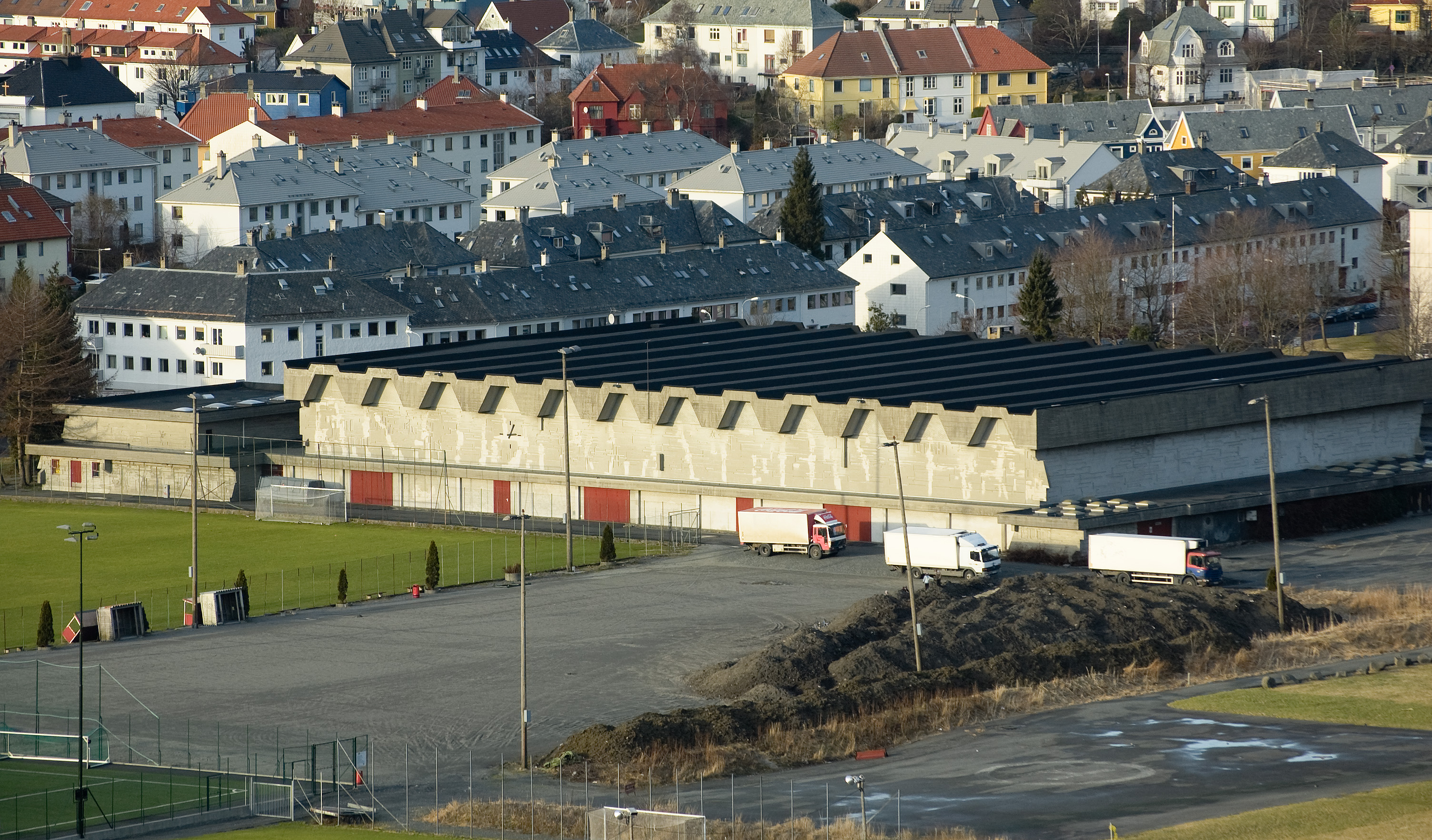
- Interactive map of Haukelandshallen
- Location: Årstad, Bergen, Norway
- Coordinates: 60°22′11.87″N 5°21′16.35″E
- Owner: Bergen Municipality
- Operator: Bergen Municipality
- Capacity: 5,100

Construction
- Built: 1965–1970
- Opened: 1970; 56 years ago
- Renovated: 1991; 2005
- Architects: Jacob Myklebust; Bjørn Simonnæs

Haukelandshallen is an indoor sport arena in Årstad borough, Bergen, Norway, not far from Brann Stadion and Nymarksbanene, and is Bergen's largest handball arena.

== Architecture ==
The building was designed by architect Bjørn Simonnæs and built between 1965 and 1970. The hall is made of untreated concrete. The material's sculptural and expressive qualities come through clearly in the building exterior's futuristic concrete reliefs. Haukelandshallen was opened in 1970, and is owned and operated by Bergen municipality.

== Usage ==
The basketball team Ulriken Eagles play their home games here. The hall has held several national handball matches for both men and women. During the 2008 European Men's Handball Championship, some of the group stage matches were played in Haukelandshallen.

It is also used for other sports such as volleyball, martial arts and archery. In addition, it is used as a gymnasium for students at Gimle skole.

In 2005, the hall was renovated and received, among other things, a new parquet floor. In January 2008, wireless internet was installed in the hall, among other things for use at championship events, as one of the first halls in the county. This was put to use for the organizer and the press when group stage matches were played in the 2008 European Men's Handball Championship in Haukelandshallen.

In 2009, a national championship in floorball was held in the Boys 19 class in Haukelandshallen. The hall was also the venue for the national chess tournament.

== See also ==
- List of indoor arenas in Norway
- List of indoor arenas in Nordic countries
