= List of indoor arenas in Norway =

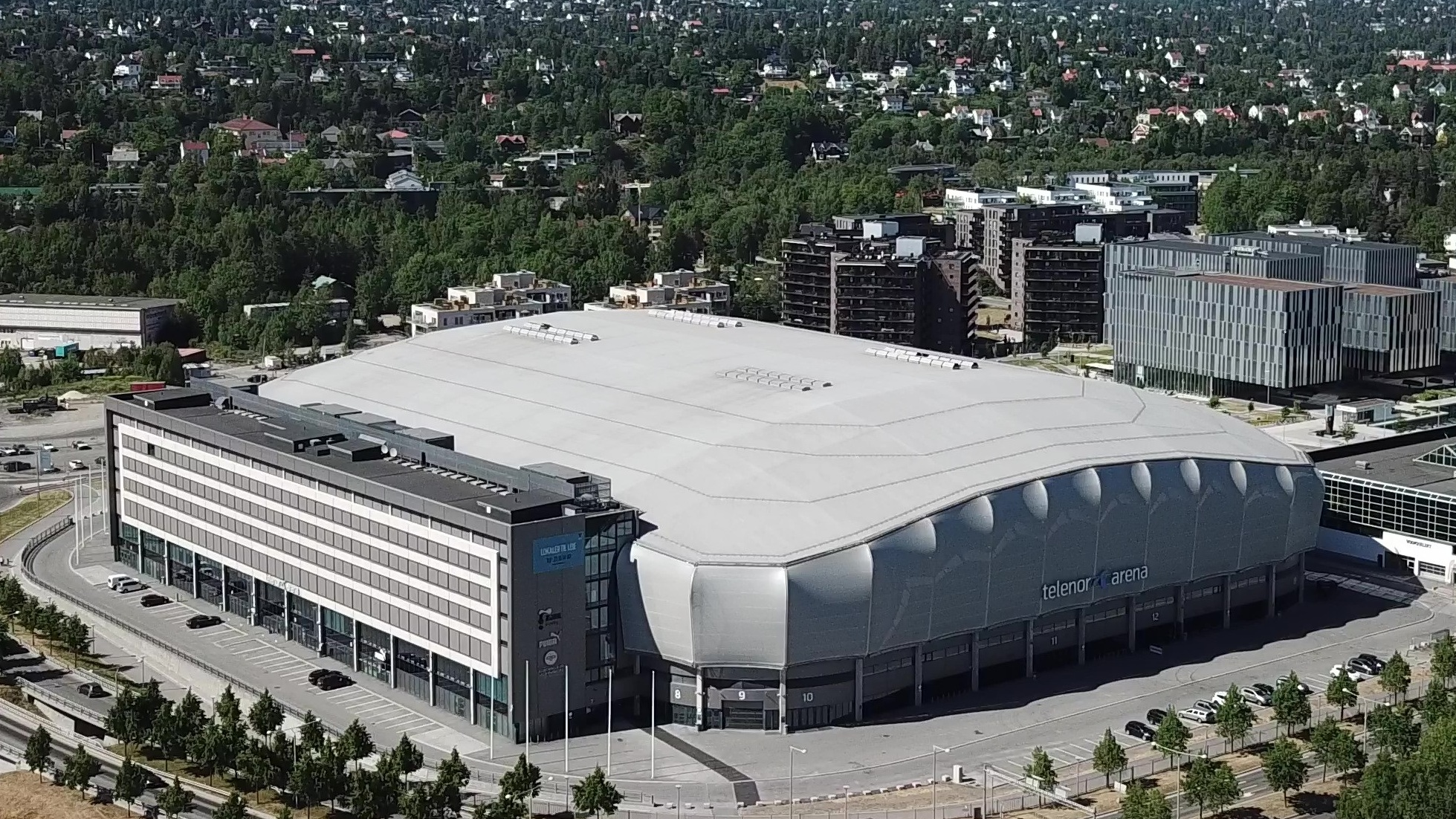
The Unity Arena in 2018.

The following is a list of indoor arenas in Norway with a capacity of at least 1,000 spectators, most of the arenas in this list are for multi use proposes and are used for popular sports such as individual sports like karate, judo, boxing as well as team sports like ice hockey, curling and handball. Parts of the arenas also host many concerts and world tours. Indoor stadiums with a capacity of 1,000 or higher are included.

== Currently in use ==
Municipality	Arena	Date built	Capacity	Image
Asker Municipality	Askerhallen	1969	2,400	
Bergen Municipality	Bergenshallen	1968	3,000	
Bergen Municipality	Haukelandshallen	1970	5,100	
Bergen Municipality	Vestlandshallen	2000	9,000	
Bergen Municipality	Åsane Arena	2020	2,220	
Bodø Municipality	Bodø Spektrum	1991	5,500	
Drammen Municipality	Drammenshallen	1978	6,000	
Fredrikstad Municipality	Stjernehallen	1970	2,473	
Gjøvik Municipality	Gjøvik Olympic Hall	1993	5,830	
Halden Municipality	Halden Ishall	1987	2,200	
Hamar Municipality	CC Amfi	1992	7,500	
Hamar Municipality	Vikingskipet	1992	10,600	
Kongsberg Municipality	Kongsberg Hallen	1988	5,500	
Kongsvinger Municipality	Kongsvinger Ishall	1992	2,000	
Larvik Municipality	Boligmappa Arena	2009	4,000	
Lillehammer Municipality	Håkons Hall	1993	11,500	
Lillehammer Municipality	Kristins Hall	1988	3,197	
Lillestrøm Municipality	LSK-Hallen	2007	3,000	
Lørenskog Municipality	Lorenskog Ishall	1988	2,450	
Oslo Municipality	Furuset Forum	1979	2,050	
Oslo Municipality	Lørenhallen	1986	1,500	
Oslo Municipality	Manglerudhallen	1979	2,000	
Oslo Municipality	Oslo Spektrum	1990	6,500	
Oslo Municipality	Unity Arena	2009	15,000	
Oslo Municipality	Vallhall Arena	2001	12,500	
Sarpsborg Municipality	Sparta Amfi	1963	3,900	
Skien Municipality	Skien Hallen	2005	1,650	
Stavanger Municipality	DNB Arena	2012	6,000	
Stavanger Municipality	Sørmarka Arena	2010	4,000	
Stavanger Municipality	Stavanger Idrettshall	1979	4,100	
Stavanger Municipality	Stavanger Ishall	1968	3,090	
Trondheim Municipality	Trondheim Spektrum	1963	12,000	
Trondheim Municipality	Dalgård Ishall	1989	1,050	
Trondheim Municipality	Leangen Ishall	1977	3,000	

== Under proposition ==
Municipality	Arena	Capacity	Opening
Drammen Municipality	New Drammen Arena	12,000	TBD
Bergen Municipality	Bergen Byarena	11,000	TBD

== See also ==
- List of football stadiums in Norway
- List of indoor arenas by capacity
- Lists of stadiums
