= 2031 World Men's Handball Championship =

Verdensmesterskabet i håndbold for mænd 2031 (in Danish) Verdensmesterskapet i håndball for menn 2031 (in Norwegian) Heimsmeistaramót karla í handknattleik 2031 (in Icelandic)

Tournament details
- Host countries: Denmark; Iceland; Norway
- Dates: January 2031
- Teams: 32 (from 5 confederations)

The 2031 IHF World Men's Handball Championship, will be the 32nd event hosted by the International Handball Federation. It will take place in Denmark, Iceland and Norway in January 2031.

== Bidding process ==
In April 2023, the IHF stated that they were looking for bids. In the end, three bids expressed interest in hosting the tournament.

- Denmark/Iceland/Norway
- France/Germany (formally with Switzerland)
- Saudi Arabia

The bids were confirmed on 1 March 2024:

- Denmark/Iceland/Norway
- France/Germany

Denmark, Iceland and Norway were awarded the hosting rights on 16 April 2024 in Créteil, France.

== Venues ==
The proposed venues are:

- (Denmark) Copenhagen – Royal Arena, capacity 12,500
- (Denmark) Herning – Jyske Bank Boxen, capacity 15,000
- (Iceland) Reykjavík – Þjóðarhöll (proposed), capacity 8,600
- (Norway) Bærum – Unity Arena, capacity 15,000
- (Norway) Trondheim – Trondheim Spektrum, capacity 8,960

Denmark will be the main host with 4 preliminary round groups, the President's Cup, two main round groups and the knockout stage, while Iceland and Norway will host two preliminary round groups and one main round group. A new arena built in Reykjavík is prerequisite to meet the tournament’s minimum requirements. There are still possibilities for a fourth country or another city in Denmark or Norway to host the games.

== Qualification ==
Qualification system will still depend on number of compulsory and performance places, as for 2029 World Championship. The World Championship hosts will be directly qualified, along with the reigning world champions. The number of compulsory places awarded to other continental confederation keeps unchanged and is divided as follows: four places each for Europe, Asia and Africa, three places for the South and Central America zone and one place for the North America and Caribbean zone. One additional place is available for Oceania, but only when that region's national team ranks fifth or higher at the Asian Championship. If no Oceania team places among the top five at the Asian Championship, the IHF will award an additional wild card. In addition, there will be 12 performance places for the continental confederations, which are based on the teams ranked 1–12 in the preceding World Championship. According to the new qualification system and taking into consideration the results of the 2029 Men's World Championship, 20 out of 32 places are distributed as follows:

Distribution of places (following current IHF rules)	Vacancies	Details	Comments
Organisers ^{1}	3		
Reigning world champion ^{2}	1		
Performance places for the continental confederations	12		Based on teams ranked 1-12 in the preceding world championship
Africa		?	
Asia		?	
Europe		?	
North America and the Caribbean		?	
South and Central America		?	
Oceania		?	
Compulsory places for the continental confederations	14		
Africa		4	
Asia		4	
Europe		4 ^{1}	
North America and the Caribbean		1	
South and Central America		3	
Oceania		1 ^{3}	Place allocated to Oceania or an additional free wild card
Wild card ^{4}	1		
Total	32		

^{1}All hosting federations are automatically entitled to take part in the World Championship. If there is more than one organiser from the same continental confederation, the number of compulsory places of the respective confederation shall be reduced accordingly. If there is more than one organiser and the organisers are not from the same confederation, the IHF Council shall decide about the reduction of the compulsory places, considering only the compulsory places of the confederations involved.
^{2}The reigning world champion automatically qualifies for the next World Championship and, as a rule, is placed first in the first performance row. In case the reigning world champion is also hosting the next World Championship, the confederation of the reigning world champion obtains one additional performance place.
^{3}The compulsory place for Oceania is subject to fulfilling certain conditions. The continental confederation of Oceania does not have a direct compulsory place for a confederational qualification event. The confederation of Oceania is invited to participate in the Asian qualification events. The compulsory place is awarded to Oceania if the representative from Oceania is ranked 5th or higher in the Asian qualification. If Oceania fails to rank 5th or does not participate, the IHF Council will award this place as a free wild card.
^{4}The wild card shall be awarded by the IHF Council.

Competition	Dates	Host	Vacancies	Qualified
Host nations	16 April 2024	(France) Créteil	3	Denmark; Iceland; Norway
2029 World Championship	TBD	France; Germany	1	
2030 European Men's Handball Championship	10 – 27 January 2030	Czech Republic; Denmark; Poland	2	
2030 African Men's Handball Championship	TBD	TBD	4(+?)	
2030 Asian Men's Handball Championship	TBD	TBD	4(+?)	
2030 South and Central American Men's Handball Championship	TBD	TBD	3(+?)	
2030 Nor.Ca. Men's Handball Championship	TBD	TBD	1(+?)	
European qualification	TBD	Various	?	
Oceania	TBD	TBD	1	
Wild card	TBD	TBD	1 or 2^{[1]}	

1. If countries from Oceania (Australia or New Zealand) participating in the Asian Championships finish within the top 5, they will qualify for the World Championships. If they finish placed sixth or lower, the place would have been transferred to the wild card spot.

=== Qualified teams ===
Team	Qualification method	Date of qualification	Appearance(s)				Previous best performance (Note: Bold text indicates they hosted that edition.)
Team	Qualification method	Date of qualification	Total	First	Last	Streak	Previous best performance
Denmark	16 April 2024	Co-hosts	28th	1954	2027	1	**Champions** (**2019**, 2021, 2023, **2025**)
Iceland	16 April 2024	Co-hosts	24th	1958	2025	1	Fifth place (1997)
Norway	16 April 2024	Co-hosts	19th	1958	2025	1	Runners-up (2017, 2019)
