= Laugardalshöll =

Multi-purpose sports and exhibition venue in Reykjavík

- Laugardalshöllin, Laugardalsholl Sport Center

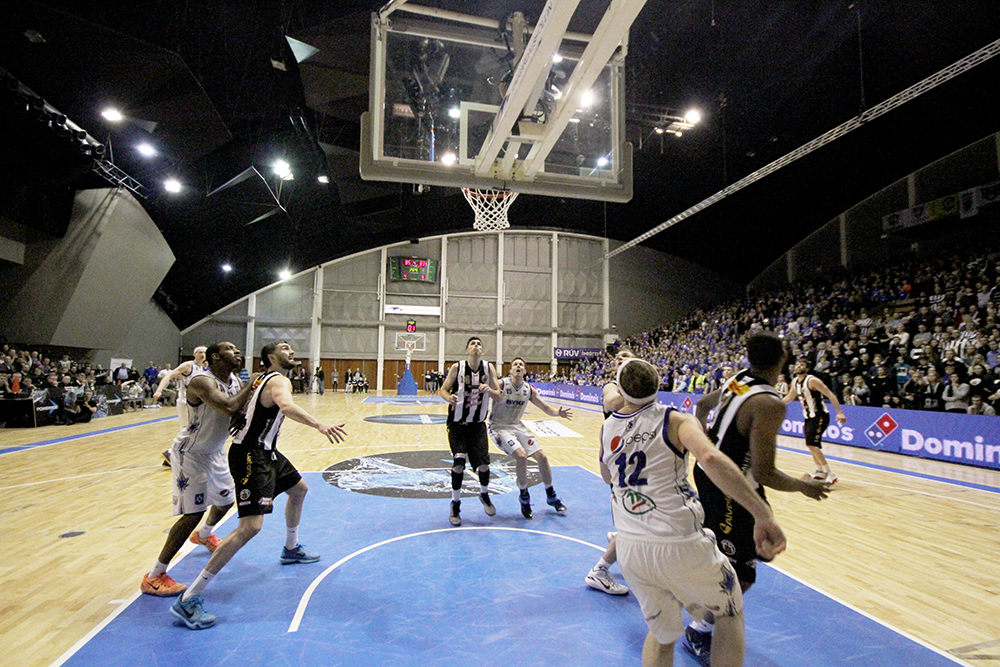
- Final of Icelandic Men's Basketball Cup in 2015
- Interactive map of Laugardalshöll
- Location: Reykjavík, Iceland
- Coordinates: 64.140305°N 21.877985°W
- Owner: City of Reykjavík
- Operator: Sports and Exhibition Center (ÍSH)
- Capacity: Sports: 2,300 for basketball and handball (main hall); Concerts: 3,000 seated or 5,500 with standing (main hall); 5,000 seated or 10,000 standing (athletics center)

Construction
- Groundbreaking: 29 August 1959
- Built: 1961, 1963–1965
- Opened: 4 December 1965
- Renovated: 2004–2005, 2022–2023
- Expanded: 1995, 2005
- Architects: Gísli Halldórsson; Skarphéðinn Jóhannesson

Tenants
- Icelandic men's national basketball team Icelandic women's national basketball team Icelandic men's national handball team Icelandic women's national handball team

Laugardalshöll (Icelandic pronunciation: [ˈlœyːɣarˌtalsˌhœtl̥]; also known as Laugardalshöllin [-ˌhœtlɪn] and Laugardalsholl Sport Center) is a multi-purpose sports and exhibition venue located in the Laugardalur district of Iceland's capital Reykjavík.

The current complex consists of two main venues, a concert and sports hall alongside an indoor arena for track and field athletics events. It is expected to be expanded in the late 2020s with a third venue, a modern 8,600-seat indoor arena that is projected to open in 2029 or 2030.

Opened on 4 December 1965, it hosts a variety of sporting events, such as handball, basketball, volleyball and athletics, as well as various other events as a general purpose venue. The capacity of the main hall, Laugardalshöllin, is currently 2,300 for basketball and handball and around 3,000 seated (or 5,500 with standing) for concerts. It also serves as the home arena to the Icelandic national teams (both male and female) in basketball and handball.

It was the largest concert venue in Iceland for many decades (before the 2002 opening of Egilshöll in the Grafarvogur district), with a maximum standing capacity of 10,000 (or 5,000 seated) in Frjálsíþróttahöllin, the adjoined athletics center which opened in 2005.

== History ==
=== Construction and opening ===
Laugardalshöllin was designed by architect Gísli Halldórsson and Skarphéðinn Jóhannsson in early 1959 and built by the city of Reykjavík and the Reykjavík Sports Association (ÍBR). Construction of the building originally started on 29 August 1959 but was largely halted shortly afterwards due to lack of funds. Following a new tender process in Spring 1961, work resumed in August that year but was again stopped this time due to strikes by various unions. The arena's roof vault was eventually cast over four days in September 1963 and the venue was finally completed on opening day in 1965. The first event held in the arena, a handball match, took place on Saturday 4 December 1965 between the Reykjavík team and the Czech team HCB Karviná, who came to Iceland at the invitation of sports club Knattspyrnufélagið Fram.

=== Later expansions ===
The first extension was built on the east side of the building to increase the number of spectator seats to around 5,500 for the 1995 World Men's Handball Championship. After the tournament, the extension was converted into a small gym for basketball but now houses conference and storage rooms.

In September 2004, it was announced that a 7,000 m^{2} extension would be built next to Laugardalshöllin designed specifically for athletics but can also host other events. Opened in November 2005, the venue includes a 200-meter running track. At the same time, maintenance and renovations also took place in the main arena's building which reopened in early September 2005 after being closed during the summer months. Further renovation work and major repairs was carried out across several months in 2022 and 2023. New parquet flooring was installed, following significant damage caused by a hot water leak in November 2020, polished and later revarnished alongside new seating in the spectator stands, lighting and a sound system that meets modern requirements for sports competitions.

=== Proposal for new venue ===
In July 1994, Morgunblaðið reported that discussions with Ingibjörg Sólrún Gísladóttir, the then mayor of Reykjavík, had taken place regarding the possible modernization or replacement of the venue ahead of hosting the 1995 World Men's Handball Championship. In 2017, the ÍBR Congress agreed to launch a feasibility study on the construction of a new multi-purpose sports hall, but this was rejected for cost reasons. It has been pointed out that the existing venue in Laugardalur does not meet modern sports standards and is in fact "obsolete and illegal" for international handball and basketball competitions but are played in the hall due to an exemption from international federations. Issues with the existing venue include the "security area", the floor area which is too small and insufficient access for journalists, media and spectators. In January 2023, plans were published for an 8,600-seat arena to be added to the complex; this would be connected to the existing venues.

== Events ==
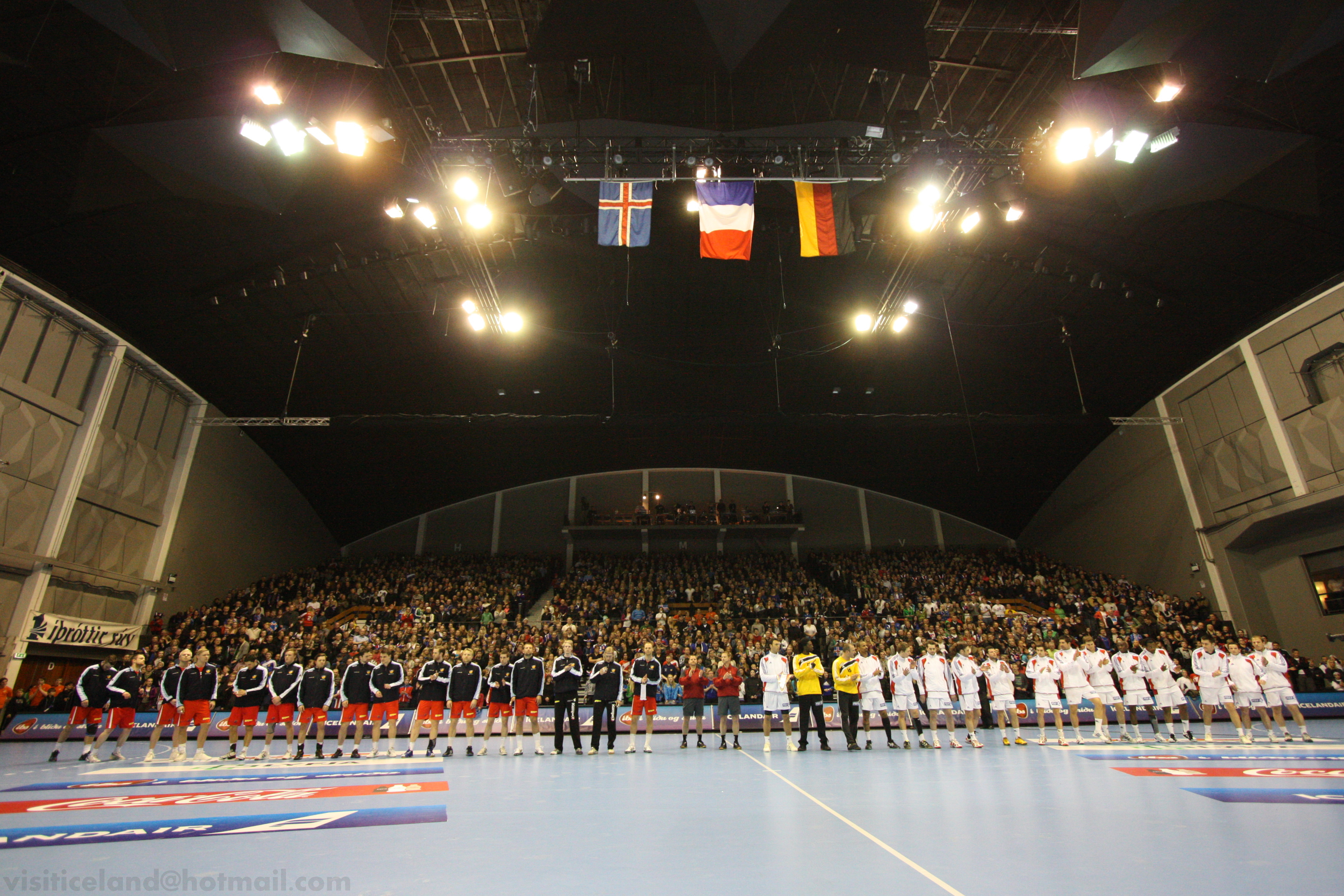
Friendly international handball match between Iceland and France in April 2010

Perhaps the most prominent event to be held at Laugardalshöll was the World Chess Championship 1972, often dubbed the "Match of the Century", in which challenger Bobby Fischer of the United States defeated the defending champion Boris Spassky of the Soviet Union. The movie Bobby Fischer Against the World (2011) features scenes from Laugardalshöll.

The arena hosted the 1995 World Men's Handball Championship and many matches of the Iceland men's national handball team, one of the most successful sports of the country.

On 14 November 2009, the "National Assembly", the first step of a constitutional reform process, was held here. It gathered 1500 citizens, of which 1200 were randomly picked from the national register. It produced a document listing the main principles of the island nation.

From 2007 to 2011, it also hosted CCP Games' EVE Online annual 'Fanfest'. The event returned in 2022.

Every year from 2016 to 2020 and again in 2024, the arena has held the finals of Söngvakeppnin, the Icelandic preliminary round for the Eurovision Song Contest.

In 2021, it hosted Riot Games' League of Legends Mid-Season Invitational and Valorant Masters from 6 May to 30 May. The arena also hosted the 2021 League of Legends World Championship from 5 October to 6 November.

== See also ==
- List of indoor arenas in Nordic countries

Preceded by Globe Arena; Stockholm	World Men's Handball Championship; Final Venue; 1995	Succeeded by Park Dome; Kumamoto
Preceded by Pudong Football Stadium; Shanghai	League of Legends World Championship; Final Venue; 2021	Succeeded by Chase Center; San Francisco
