= Lillehammer IF =

Norwegian athletics club

- Full name: Lillehammer Idrettforening
- Founded: 28 May 1919
- Ground: Stampesletta, Lillehammer

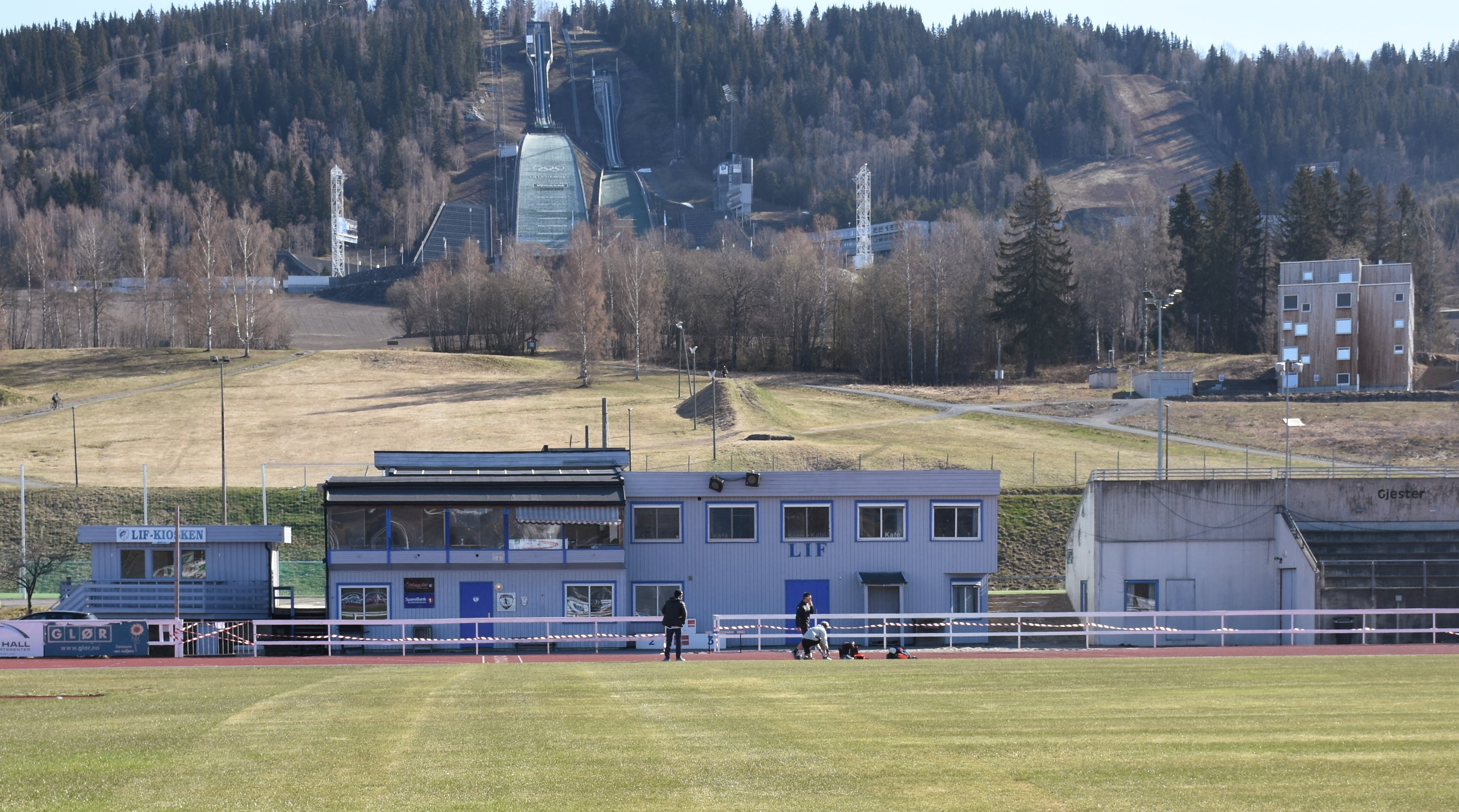
LIF clubhouse

Lillehammer Idrettforening is a Norwegian athletics club from Lillehammer, founded on 28 May 1919. At that time city already had four different sports teams; for cross-country skiing (since 1882), gymnastics (since 1892), speed skating (since 1897) and football (since 1911) respectively.

Its most prominent recent member is Morten Sand, who participated at the 2006 European Championships. Prominent former members include high jumper Astrid Tveit and long-distance runner Brynhild Synstnes.

The club hosts the Veidekkelekene, the second largest athletics meet in Norway.

== History ==
In 1973, Stampesletta opened, and the club moved from Sportsplassen i Lillehammer to there, with the old venue being retired in 1975. In 1977, the club hosted the Norwegian Athletics Championships at Stampesletta. It was the last time the championships were held on gravel, and this caused problems because excessive rain drowned the venue, and the fire department had to pump off the water. The club started planning fixed surface on the venue in 1980, and was granted a loan for NOK 500,000. On 18 August 1981, the municipal council voted to grant NOK 200,000 for the upgrade. The work was largely done with voluntary work, and the new surface was inaugurated on 28 August 1982 with the Norwegian Relay Athletics Championship. The running track was renovated in 2003, and received a new surface layer and paint job.

Lillehammer IF has hosted the Norwegian Athletics Championships three times, in 1977, 1995 and 2009. They have also hosted a series of other Norwegian championships, such as the Norwegian Junior Athletics Championships in 1958, 1987 and 2002, and the Norwegian Relay Athletics Championships in 1960, 1974, 1976, 1982, 1991 and 1999. Veidekkelekene is an annual track and field tournament held at Stampesletta. In 2010 it had 1,150 participants and is organized by Lillehammer IF, Gausdal FIK and Moelven IL. The tournament is the second-largest track and field event in Norway, after Tyrvinglekene.

== Venue ==
Lillehammer IF is based at Stampesletta, a multi-sports complex located 1 kilometer (0.6 mi) from the town center. The track and field venue has eight lanes around the full course, as well as a start allowing 110 meter hurdling. In addition to the track and field venue, it has a main artificial turf football field with a grandstand, which is shared with the track and field venue.
