= Stampesletta =

Stadium complex in Lillehammer, Norway

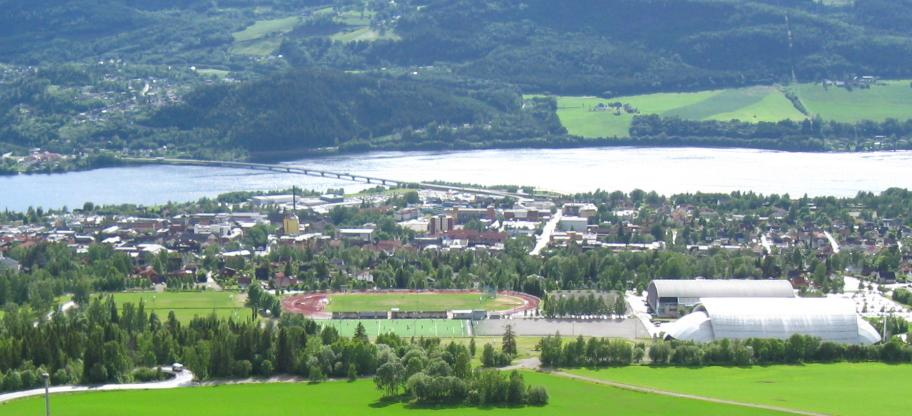
- Stampesletta
- Interactive map of Stampesletta
- Full name: Stampesletta Idrettspark
- Location: Lillehammer, Norway
- Coordinates: 61°07′18″N 10°28′26″E
- Owner: Lillehammer Municipality
- Surface: Artificial turf (football); Fixed surface (track and field)

Construction
- Groundbreaking: 1949
- Opened: 1949
- Renovated: 1982

Tenants
- Lillehammer FK (football) (1949–); Lillehammer IF (track and field) (1973–); Norwegian Athletics Championships (1977, 1995, 2009); 1994 Winter Olympics); 2016 Winter Youth Olympics

Stampesletta is a multi-use stadium complex in Lillehammer, Norway. Owned and operated by Lillehammer Municipality, it consists of a track and field venue, an artificial turf football field, three natural grass football fields, a gravel field and natural grass training pitches. In addition, it features a club house, locker facilities and a grandstand between the athletics and artificial turf fields. The venue is located about 1 kilometer (0.6 mi) from the town center, and serves as the home ground for the Second Division side Lillehammer FK, Lillehammer KFK, Roterud IL in football, and Lillehammer IF in athletics.

Construction of Stampesletta started in 1946 and the grass football field opened in 1949. A now removed equestrian exhibition area opened in 1958, and in 1973 the track and field venue opened. The latter received a hard surface in 1982. During the 1994 Winter Olympics, Stampesletta itself was used for medal ceremonies, attracting crowds of up to 30,000 people. The area around Stampesletta was sometimes referred to as the Olympic Park, as it also has in its immediate vicinity the ice hockey venues Håkons Hall and Eidsiva Arena, the ski jumping hill Lysgårdsbakken, and Kanthaugen Freestyle Arena. The two halls are often regarded as part of Stampesletta. The arena is used as the goal are for Birkebeinerrittet and Birkebeinerløpet, and from 1932 to 1992 for Birkebeinerrennet. Stampesletta hosted the Norwegian Athletics Championships in 1977, 1995 and 2009, and annually hosts Norway's second-largest track and field tournament, Veidekkelekene. Stampesletta is scheduled to host the opening and closing ceremonies of the 2016 Winter Youth Olympics.

== History ==
The area around Stampesletta, which is located along the creek Mesnaelva, and means "the plain beside a mill". The area, which traditionally had been called Myra, was originally part of the farm Lysgård, with Stampesletta being its own croft. The area was bought by Lillehammer Municipality in 1933. The hillside further up, at Kanthaugen and Lysgård, featured ski activities from the turn of the 20th century. Plans to use one of the few flat places in Lillehammer for sports was launched by the municipal planning office in 1941. However, the German occupation of Norway caused an interruption in the plans, and a prisoner-of-war camp for Russians, Lager Edelweiss, was located there instead.

Construction of the grass field started in 1946, after the municipality had decided to build a multi-sport complex. The original stadium was by the contemporary capital press described as having "international proportions". The venue was planned built in several stages, and the plans called for a main football field with grass turf and a main athletics field. Additional plans called for an outdoor swimming pool, tennis courts, an indoor arena for handball and gymnastics, and a club house. The grass pitch was officially opened by Mayor Einar Hansen in 1949, and had a spectator capacity for 12,000 people. Two years later, a hostel, owned by the municipality and with room for 108 people, opened beside the venue.

In 1958, an equestrian exhibition area was built at Stampesletta to host the state's mare exhibition, which had previously been held in Lillehammer from 1887 to 1940. It was by Agricultural Director Aslak Lidtveidt as the country's most modern. The venue also became home of the state's stallion display. The exhibition grounds covered an area of 4 hectares (10 acres), cost NOK 190,000 and included two stables. The show remained at Lillehammer until the opening of Biri Travbane.

The track and field venue opened in 1973, with a capacity for 6,000 people. The following year Lillehammer IF moved from Sportsplassen i Lillehammer to Stampesletta, with the old venue being retired in 1975. In 1977, Stampesletta hosted the Norwegian Athletics Championships. It was the last time the championships were held on gravel, and this caused problems because excessive rain drowned the venue, and the fire department had to pump off the water. The club started planning fixed surface on the venue in 1980, and was granted a loan for NOK 500,000. On 18 August 1981, the municipal council voted to grant NOK 200,000 for the upgrade. The work was largely done with voluntary work, and the new surface was inaugurated on 28 August 1982 with the Norwegian Relay Athletics Championship.

In 1970, the plans for an indoor arena, primarily for handball, was launched again, but the cost of NOK 6 million was not able to be financed. Following the work with the Lillehammer bid for the 1992 Winter Olympics, the plans resurfaced, this time with an ice hockey rink to be the centerpiece. In 1985, Lillehammer Municipal Council accepted an agreement with the Norwegian Confederation of Sports (NIF), which offered to finance 50% of a new multi-use arena in Lillehammer. The venue opened in December 1988 and cost NOK 65 million. After Lillehammer was awarded the 1994 Winter Olympics in 1988, it became necessary to build a larger venue to hold the Olympic ice hockey matches. In June 1989, the municipal council voted to locate most of the Lillehammer venues to the Stampesletta area, and to put Håkons Hall adjacent to Kristins Hall. This was controversial among the politicians, and many councilors voted in support of the originally-planned decentralized plan, with the venues spread out through the municipality. Håkons Hall cost NOK 238 million and it opened on 1 February 1993. Prior to the Olympics, the power lines across the fields were dug down to give better television images. The bid for the Olympics had also included using Stampesletta for the speed skating events, but with the new demands for an indoor venue, it was instead decided to build Vikingskipet in Hamar.

The running track was renovated in 2003, and received a new surface layer and paint job. In 2005, the club house was completed by the women's football club. In 2006, the gravel ice rink received an artificial ice machine to secure stable ice conditions throughout the winter.

== Facilities ==
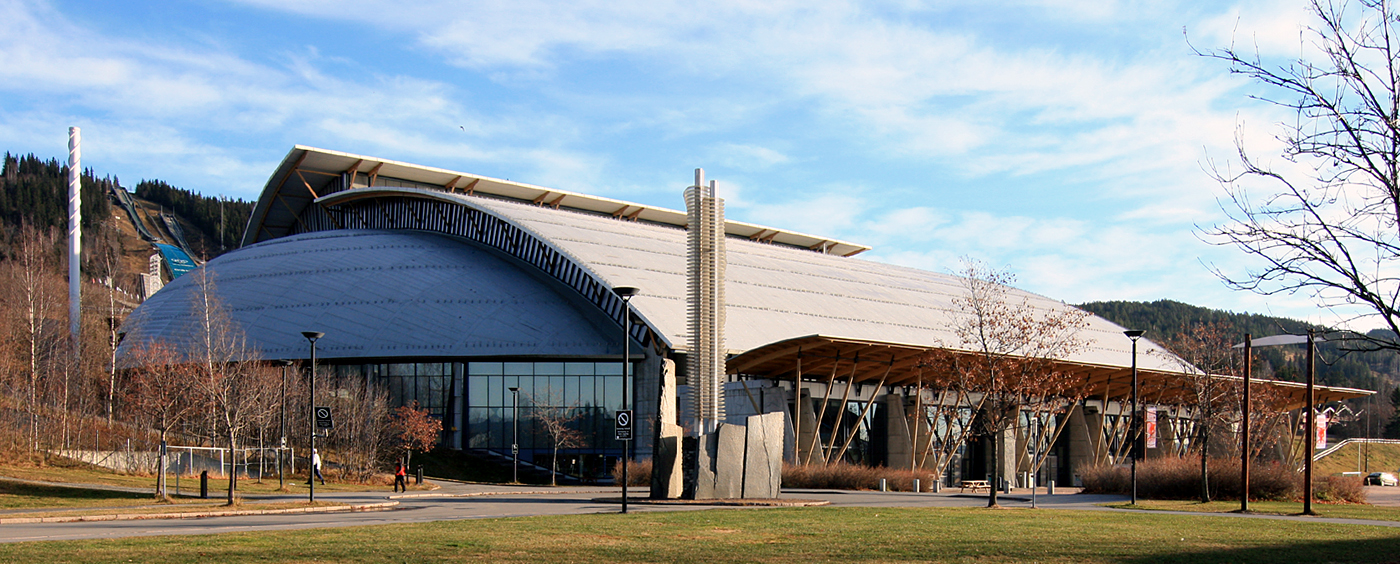
Håkons Hall

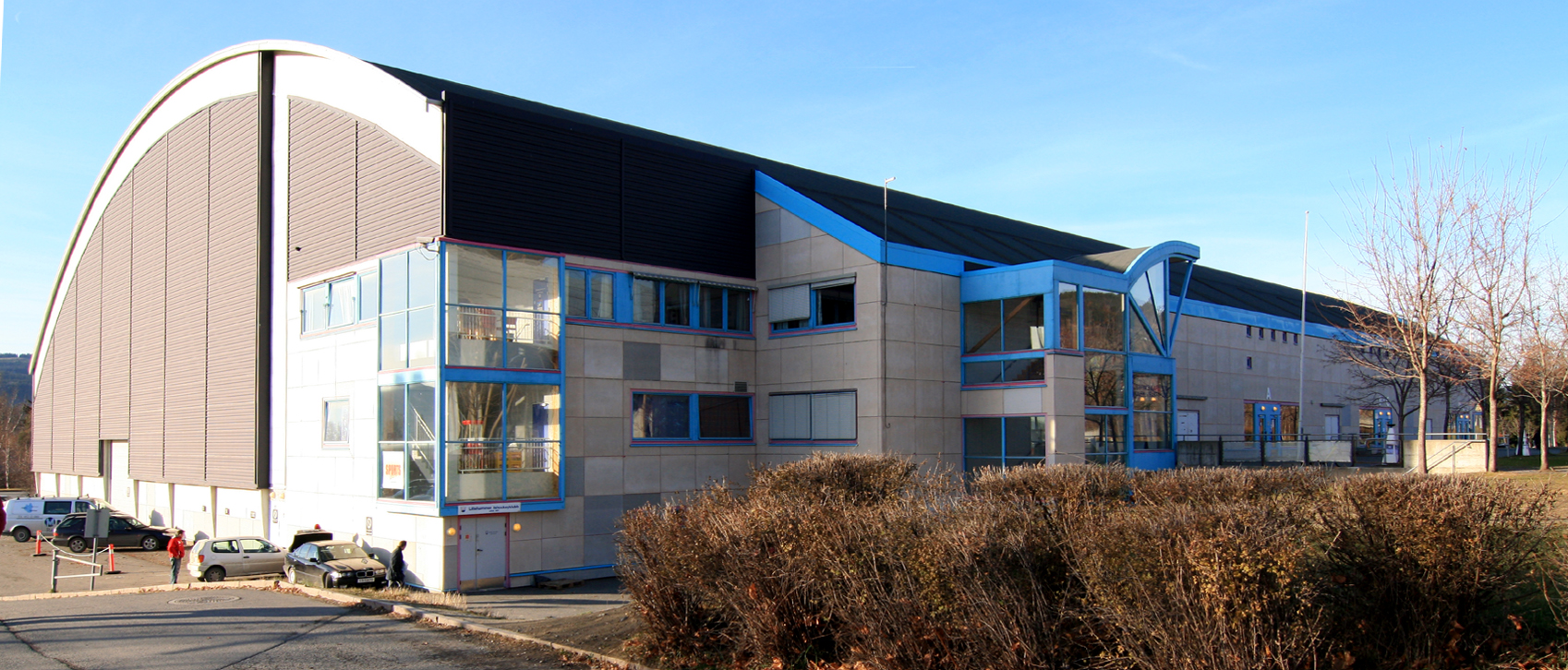
Eidsiva Arena

The sports complex consists of a track and field venue, a main artificial turf football field with a grandstand, three natural grass football fields, a gravel field and warm-up/practice fields with grass. The track and field venue has eight lanes around the full course, as well as a start allowing 110 meter hurdling.

Eidsiva Arena consists of two halls, one featuring an ice hockey rink and one with a handball court. The arena also has a curling rink and a running track. The ice hockey rink has room for 3,197 spectators and is the home venue of GET-ligaen side Lillehammer IK. Håkons Hall is a multi-sport arena which is used for international handball and ice hockey matches, as well as conferences, conventions and banquets. The venue has a capacity for 11,500, making it the largest handball and ice hockey venue in the country. It can make use of the main hall for two handball or football field, or six volleyball or badminton courts. In addition, there is a permanent health club, a climbing wall, an aerobics room, a golf center with two golf simulators and a putting green, and two badminton courts. The hall also features a 370 meters (1,210 ft) long sprinting track and the Norwegian Olympic Museum The Olympics ski jumping hill Lysgårdsbakken and Kanthaugen Freestyle Arena are located a few hundred meters from Stampesletta. Collectively, the area is sometimes referred to as the Olympic Park.

== Events ==
The football fields are used by Lillehammer FK, Lillehammer KFK, and Roterud IL's senior teams. As of 2012, Lillehammer FK's first-team plays in the Second Division. The track and field venue is used by Lillehammer IF. Veidekkelekene is an annual track and field tournament held at Stampesletta. In 2010 it had 1,150 participants and is organized by Lillehammer IF, Gausdal FIK and Moelven IL. The tournament is the second-largest track and field event in Norway, after Tyrvinglekene. Lillehammer IF has hosted the Norwegian Athletics Championships three times, in 1977, 1995 and 2009. They have also hosted a series of other Norwegian championships, such as the Norwegian Junior Athletics Championships in 1958, 1987 and 2002, and the Norwegian Relay Athletics Championships in 1960, 1974, 1976, 1982, 1991 and 1999.

From 1932 to 1992, Birkebeinerrittet, a mass ski marathon between Rena and Lillehammer, has used Stampesletta as a start or goal area, depending on if the race ran from Lillehammer to Rena or in the opposite direction. Since 1992, the goal area was moved to Birkebeineren Ski Stadium. Birkebeinerrittet, a cycle version of the ski marathon, has its goal area at Stampesletta. The half-marathon terrain race Birkebeinerløpet uses Stampesletta as its start and goal area. During the 1994 Winter Olympics, Stampesletta was used for medal ceremonies for all non-skating events. The backdrops for the podium was built using ice and snow, with the podium itself being made from ice from the glacier Jostedalsbreen. This contrasted with the surrounding pine elements. Attendance was free, and between 25,000 and 30,000 people attended the medal ceremonies. Lillehammer is scheduled to host the 2016 Winter Youth Olympics. The Stampesletta area will be used for the opening and closing ceremonies with a spectator capacity of 6,000 to 8,000; existing and new buildings nearby will be used for the Olympic Village.

== Bibliography ==
- Mathisen, Ola Matti (1998). Mesnaelva: elva i våre hjerter. Thorsrud. ISBN 82-7847-025-1.
- Lillehammer IF (1994). Fra grus til fast dekke : Lillehammer idrettsforening 75 år. Thorsrud. ISBN 82-90439-84-9.
- Fåberg historielag (1993). Dølaby med OL-vekst. ISBN 82-90385-14-5.

Preceded by Bergiselschanze; Innsbruck	Winter Youth Olympics; Opening and Closing Ceremonies; 2016	Succeeded by Stade Pierre de Coubertin; Lausanne
