= Håkons Hall =

Arena in Lillehammer, Norway

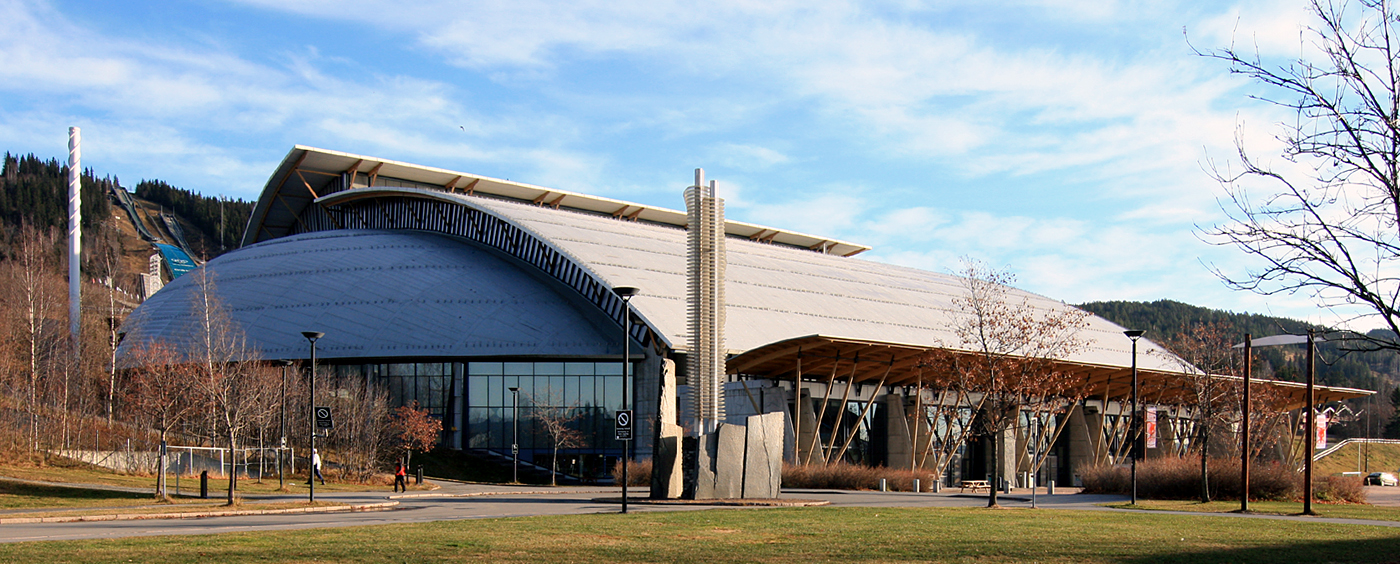
- Interactive map of Håkons Hall
- Location: Stampesletta, Lillehammer, Norway
- Coordinates: 61°07′26″N 10°28′27″E
- Owner: Lillehammer Olympiapark
- Capacity: 11,500

Construction
- Opened: 1 February 1993
- Cost: 238 million kr
- Main contractor: Veidekke

Håkons Hall, sometimes anglicized as Håkon Hall and Haakons Hall, is an arena located at Stampesletta in Lillehammer, Norway. With a spectator capacity of 11,500 people, it is the largest handball and ice hockey venue in the country. Håkons Hall is regularly used for handball and ice hockey tournaments, concerts, exhibitions, conferences and banquets. The venue is owned by Lillehammer Municipality via the subsidiary Lillehammer Olympiapark, which owns all the Olympic venues in Lillehammer. The Norwegian Olympic Museum is located in the arena, which is located next to the smaller Eidsiva Arena.

The hall opened on 1 February 1993, having cost 238 million Norwegian krone (NOK). It was built to host the ice hockey tournament at the 1994 Winter Olympics, and has since hosted the opening and closing ceremonies of the 1994 Winter Paralympics, the 1999 IIHF World Championship in ice hockey, the World Women's Handball Championship in 1993 and 1999, the Junior Eurovision Song Contest 2004, the 2008 European Men's Handball Championship and the 2010 European Women's Handball Championship. Lillehammer IK has occasionally played ice hockey matches at the arena.

== Construction ==
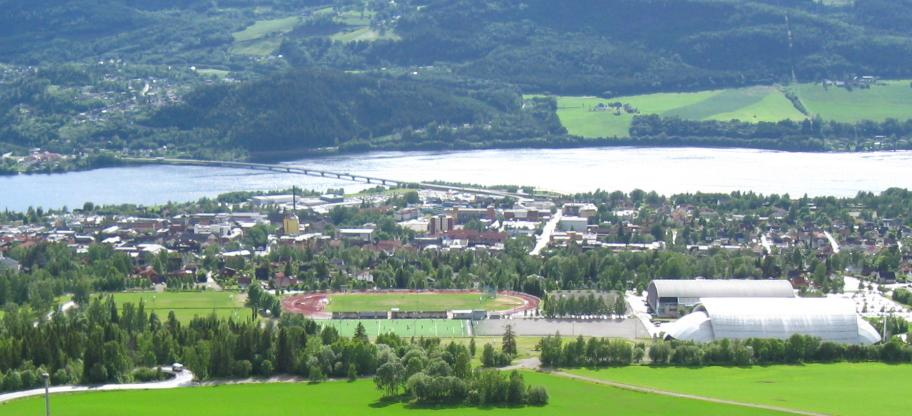
Stampesletta with Håkons Hall to the front at the right, and Eidsiva Arena behind it

Lillehammer received its first indoor ice rink in 1988, with the opening of Kristins Hall. That same year, the town was awarded the 1994 Winter Olympics, which required the construction of a larger venue for the Olympic ice hockey matches. The naming of the arena was decided by the Lillehammer Municipal Council in October 1988, as part of a broader branding policy, based on the history of the Birkebeiner. Håkons Hall is named for Haakon Haakonarson, a medieval king of Norway who as a child was transported across the mountains by skiers. Håkon and Kristin became the mascots for the Olympics, and the twin arenas at Stampesletta were named accordingly. Protests were made in Bergen, as local patriots felt it was not suitable that a sports venue had such a similar name to Håkonshallen, a medieval hall in Bergen.

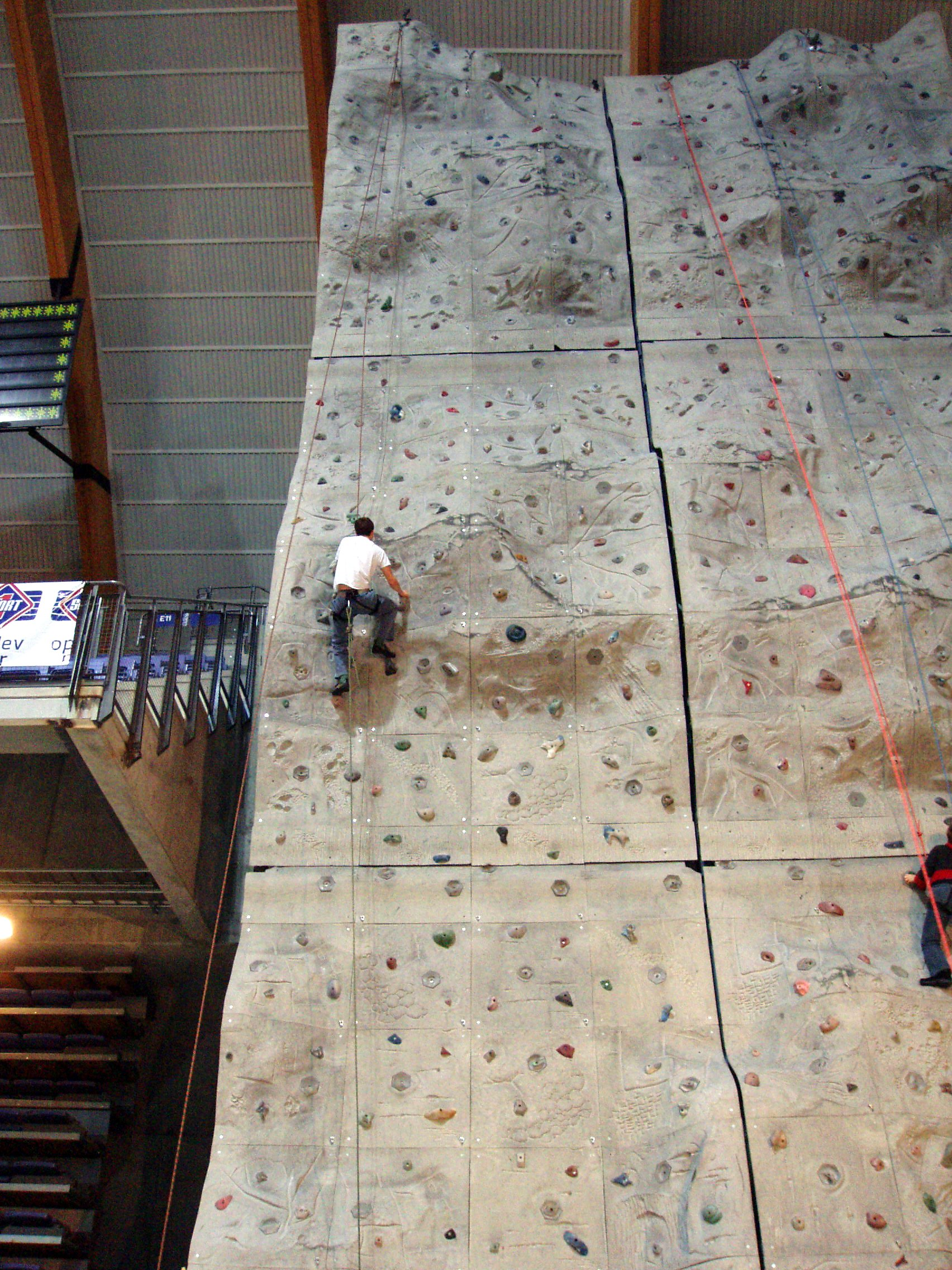
A climber ascending the climbing wall at Håkons Hall.

In June 1989, the municipal council voted to locate most of the Lillehammer venues in the Stampesletta area, and to place Håkons Hall adjacent to Kristins Hall. This was controversial and many councilors voted for the original decentralized plan, with the venues spread out through the municipality. The application for the Olympics called for building up to five ice venues in Lillehammer. For post-Olympic use, Kristins Hall was designated as the main ice rink for Lillehammer, while it was planned that Håkons Hall would be used for larger events. On 8 December 1989, the International Olympic Committee rejected two demands from the International Ice Hockey Federation (IIHF) for the ability to host a minimum of 12,000 spectators in the larger ice hockey venue and for a women's ice hockey tournament.

The decision about the location of the ice hockey venues was made on 10 October 1990. Håkons Hall would be the main venue, supplemented by Gjøvik Olympic Cavern Hall in Gjøvik. The proposal to have figure skating at Håkons Hall was rejected, and instead it was to be held at Hamar Olympic Amphitheatre in Hamar. In 1990, the Norwegian Cycling Federation recommended Håkons Hall as one of several possible places to build a velodrome for the Union Cycliste Internationale's 1993 UCI Track Cycling World Championships. The same year, Håkons Hall was proposed to supplement Oslo Spektrum as a venue for a proposed pan-European professional ice hockey league. Construction was approved by the Parliament of Norway in April 1990, including funding. Original design plans called for a simple hangar-like design, and original cost estimates were for NOK 191 million. However, in March 1991, the municipal council decided to increase spending on the venue to make it more aesthetic. The re-design also included telescopic stands and better acoustics, to allow for more flexible use after the Olympics.

The main contractor was Veidekke and construction cost NOK 238 million. Grants were given from the Norwegian Water Resources and Energy Directorate and SINTEF for energy economization. The work on the hall was concluded on 1 February 1993. It was the 27th indoor ice hockey rink in Norway.

== Facilities ==
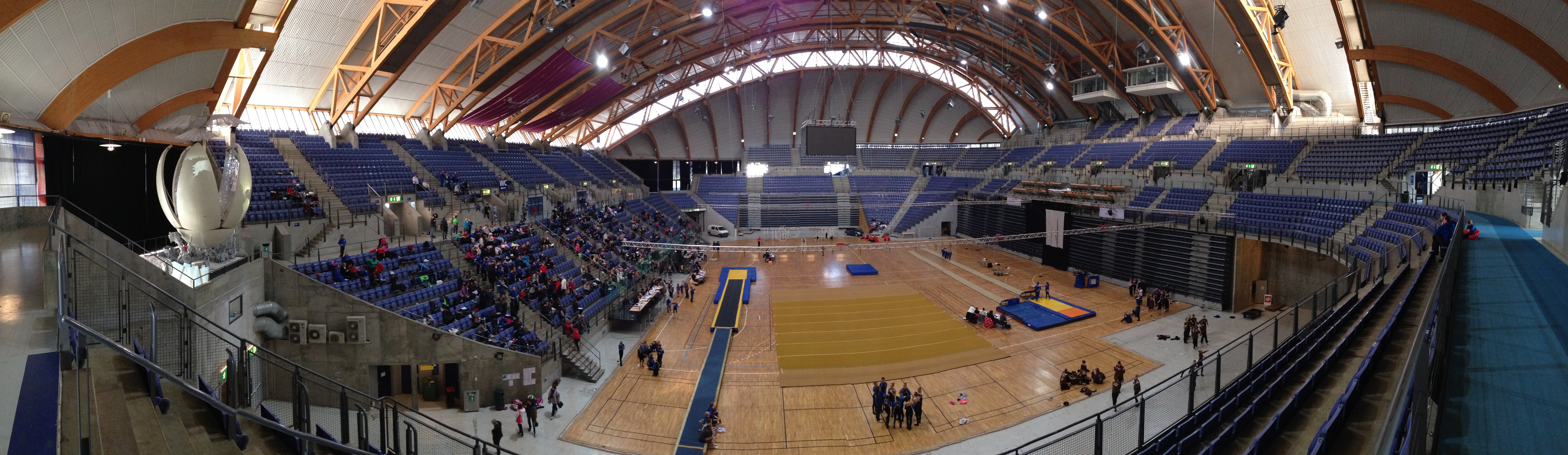
Indoor Panorama of Håkons Hall (March 2013)

The structure is dug out of the ground so it does not appear monumental in size from the outside. The roof consists of four sections held up by double trussed beams in glued laminated timber, with lengths up to 85.4 meters (280 ft). The hall is 127 meters (417 ft) long and has a total surface area of 23,000 square meters (250,000 sq ft). The main hall has a floor area of 3,500 square meters (38,000 sq ft), with an activity area of 76 by 44 meters (249 by 144 ft). The maximum ceiling height is 40 meters (130 ft), and there is a direct drive-in entrance to the hall for exhibitions. The venue has a capacity for 11,500 seated spectators. The stands are flexible and telescopic, allowing for flexibility in hall use and seating capacity. The arena can be configured with a 330 square meters (3,600 sq ft) stage. The hall can be set up to serve 2,000 people at a banquet, or divided up to serve smaller groups. The venue also features a cafeteria which can seat 200 people. For trade fairs, the venue offers 3,500 square meters (38,000 sq ft), in addition to the VIP and lobby facilities. The same area can also be used for conferences, and the venue can be split up into section to create group rooms, theme rooms and banquet rooms.

Håkons Hall Sports Centre is part of the complex which supplements the main hall with a recreational training facility. It can make use of the main hall for two handball or football courts, or six volleyball or badminton courts. In addition, there is a permanent health club, a climbing wall, an aerobic room, a golf center with two golf simulators and a putting green, and two badminton courts, all served by 13 changing rooms. The venue also features a 370 meters (1,210 ft) long running track. The cooling and heating systems for Håkons Hall and Eidsiva Arena are connected, allowing them to function as energy reserves for each other.

== Events ==
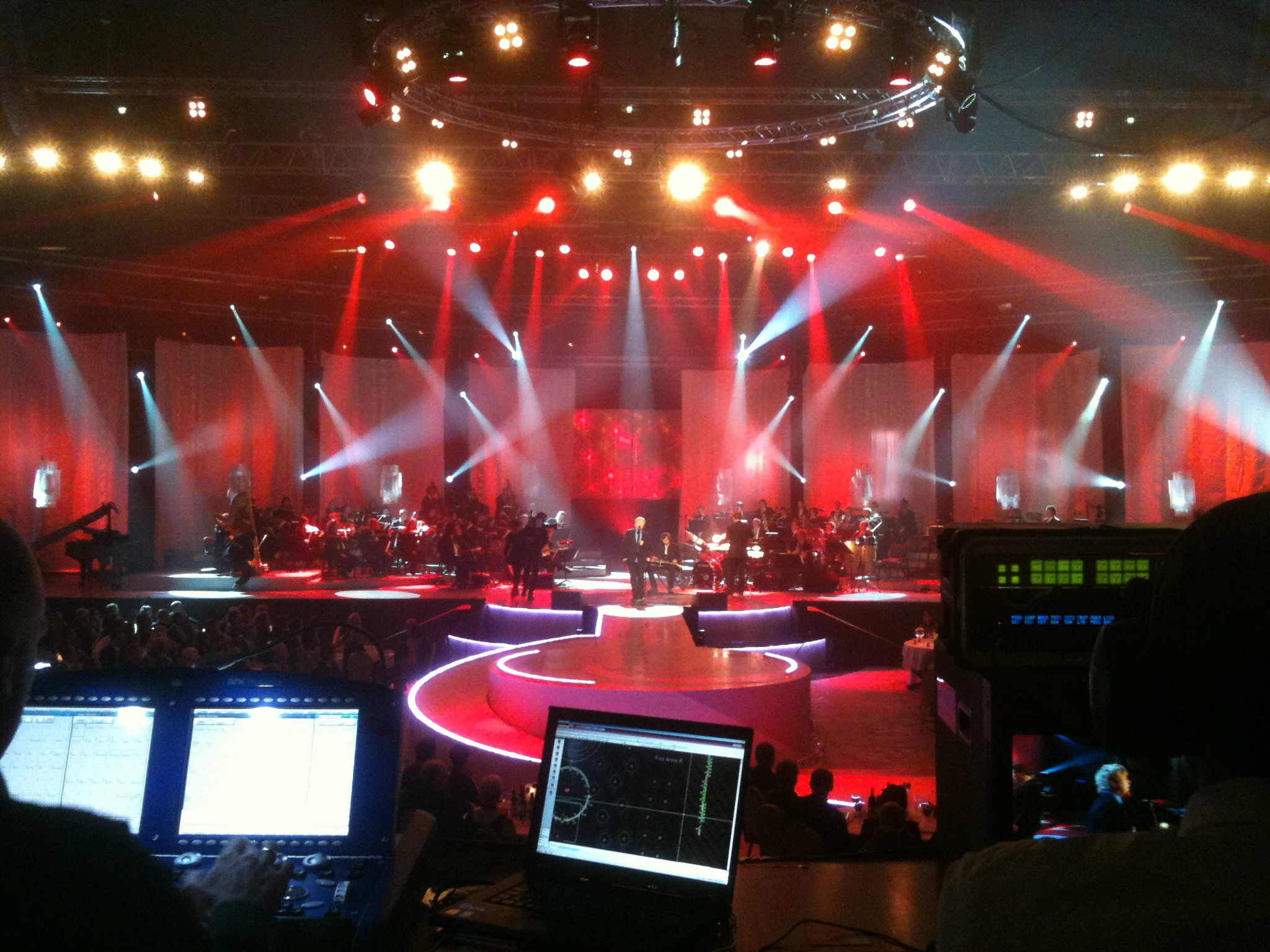
Kurt Nilsen performing during Idrettsgallaen 2010.

During the 1994 Winter Olympics, Håkons Hall hosted the ice hockey tournament along with Gjøvik Olympic Cavern Hall between 12 and 26 February. Håkons Hall hosted 21 games, including the final which saw Sweden beat Canada in a penalty shootout. In the 1994 Winter Paralympics, Håkons Hall was used for the opening and closing ceremonies.

The first major international tournament in the hall was some matches of the 1993 World Women's Handball Championship. Lillehammer IK plays its home matches at Eidsiva Arena, but in 1995 the play-off match between it and neighbor town rivals Storhamar Dragons was played at Håkons Hall. The match saw more than 5,000 spectators, the record for Lillehammer IK. In 1995, the award ceremony for Spellemannsprisen, Norwegian music's highest award, was held at Håkons Hall.

Norway hosted the 1999 IIHF Ice Hockey World Championship in Oslo, Lillehammer and Hamar. Håkons Hall featured Group D, consisting of Russia, Finland, Belarus and Kazakhstan, as well as the semi-finals, the bronze final and the final. Tickets were sold as twins, with two games being staged with a one-hour interlude on the same ticket. The same year, Håkons Hall was one of seven venues used for the 1999 World Women's Handball Championship. In addition to group stage and play-off matches, it was awarded the final. Oslo Spektrum was also considered to hold the final, but with only 8,500 seats and a higher rent, Håkons Hall was preferred.

Håkons Hall hosted the Junior Eurovision Song Contest 2004 on 20 November 2004, won by María Isabel with "Antes Muerta que Sencilla". Norway was the host of the 2008 European Men's Handball Championship; the group stage games were played in four other Norwegian cities, while the play-off and final was played in Håkons Hall in January 2008. The final saw Denmark beat Croatia in front of 9,052 spectators. In 2010, Idrettsgallaen, a show to honor the past year's Norwegian sports and athletes achievements, was hosted at Håkons Hall. Norway and Denmark co-hosted the 2010 European Women's Handball Championship in December 2010, with the matches played in Norway being at Håkons Hall and Arena Larvik. Lillehammer featured Norway's group in the first and second group stages, while the knockout stage was played in Denmark.

On 18 November 2017, a match between rivals Lillehammer IK and Storhamar Ishockey took place in Håkons Hall, this match was marketed as the "Hockey Classic" and was a huge success. The game was watched by a record setting 10,031 spectators in the Norwegian GET-ligaen and a new Hockey Classic is set to take place on 17 November 2018.

== See also ==
- List of indoor arenas in Norway
- List of indoor arenas in Nordic countries

Preceded by Hallenstadion; Zürich	European Men's Handball Championship; Final Venue; 2008	Succeeded by Wiener Stadthalle; Vienna
