= Lasse Boesen =

Danish handball player (born 1979)

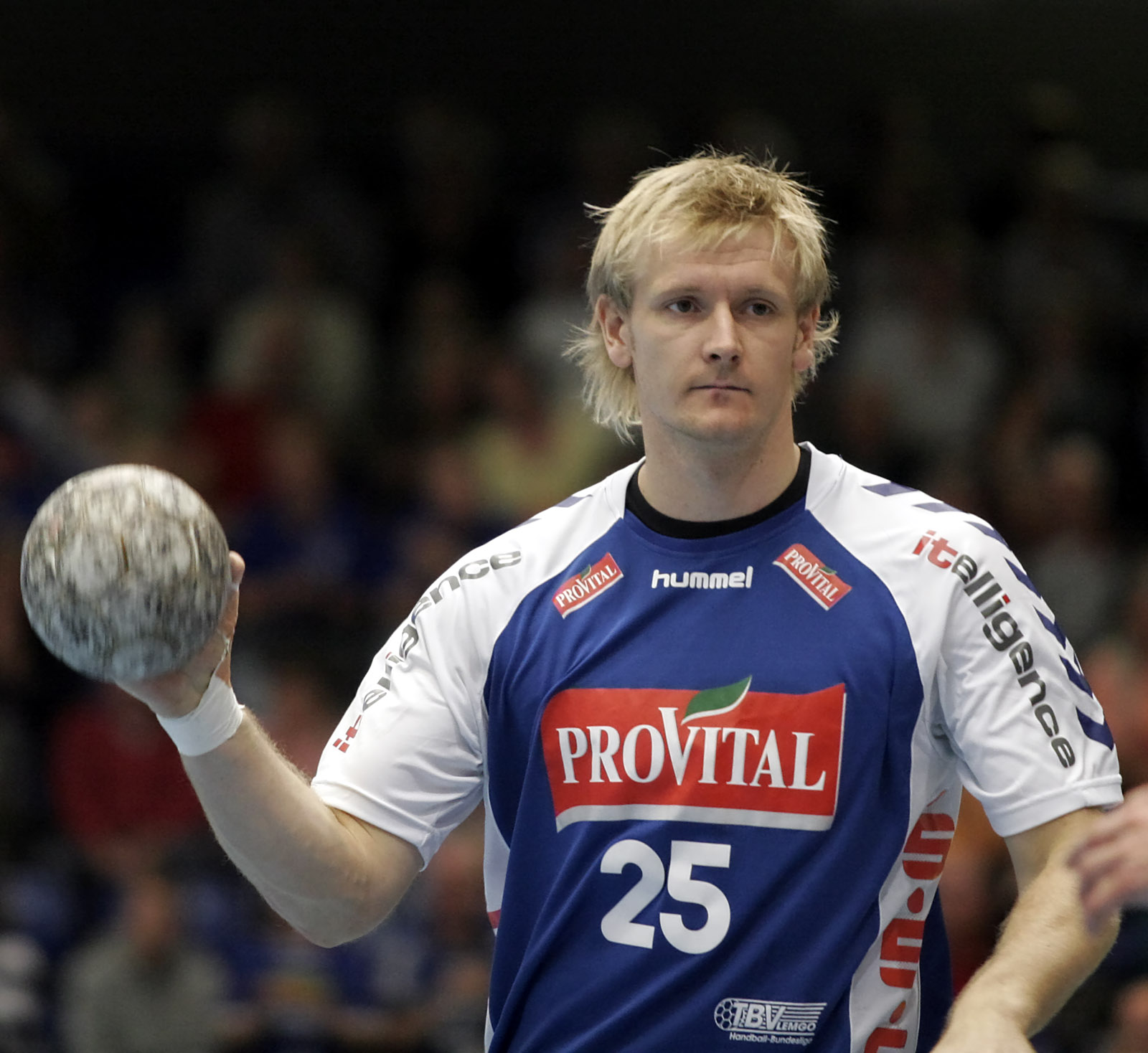

Personal information
- Full name: Lasse Motzkus Boesen
- Nationality: Danish
- Born: 18 September 1979 (age 47) Vamdrup, Denmark
- Height: 1.92 m (6 ft 4 in)

Sport
- Sport: Handball
- Position: Left back

Senior clubs
- Years: Team
- 1997-2003: KIF Kolding
- 2003-2006: Portland San Antonio
- 2006-2007: KIF Kolding
- 2007-2008: TBV Lemgo
- 2008-2011: SG Flensburg-Handewitt
- 2011-2015: KIF Kolding København
National team
Years	Team	Apps	(Gls)
2000-2012	Denmark	159	(406)

Teams managed
- 2024-2026: GGIF Grindsted (ass.coach)
Medal record
Men's handball
Representing Denmark
World Championships
Silver medal – second place	2011 Sweden	Team
Bronze medal – third place	2007 Germany	Team
European Championships
Gold medal – first place	2008 Norway	Team
Junior World Championship
Gold medal – first place	1999 Qatar	Team
Danish Championships
Gold medal – first place	2000	Team competition
Gold medal – first place	2001	Team competition
Gold medal – first place	2002	Team competition
Spanish Championships
Gold medal – first place	2004	Team competition

Lasse Boesen (born 18 September 1979) is a Danish retired team handball player and current coach. He is European Champion by winning the 2008 European Men's Handball Championship with the Danish national handball team. He received a bronze medal at the 2007 World Championships.

In 2006 he won the Danish Men's Handball Cup with KIF Kolding and was named MVP for the tournament.

From 2024 to 2026 he was the assistant caoch at GGIF Grindsted. During his time at the club Grindsted played their first and second ever season in the Danish top league.
