= Drammenshallen =

Sports and concert arena in Drammen, Buskerud, Norway

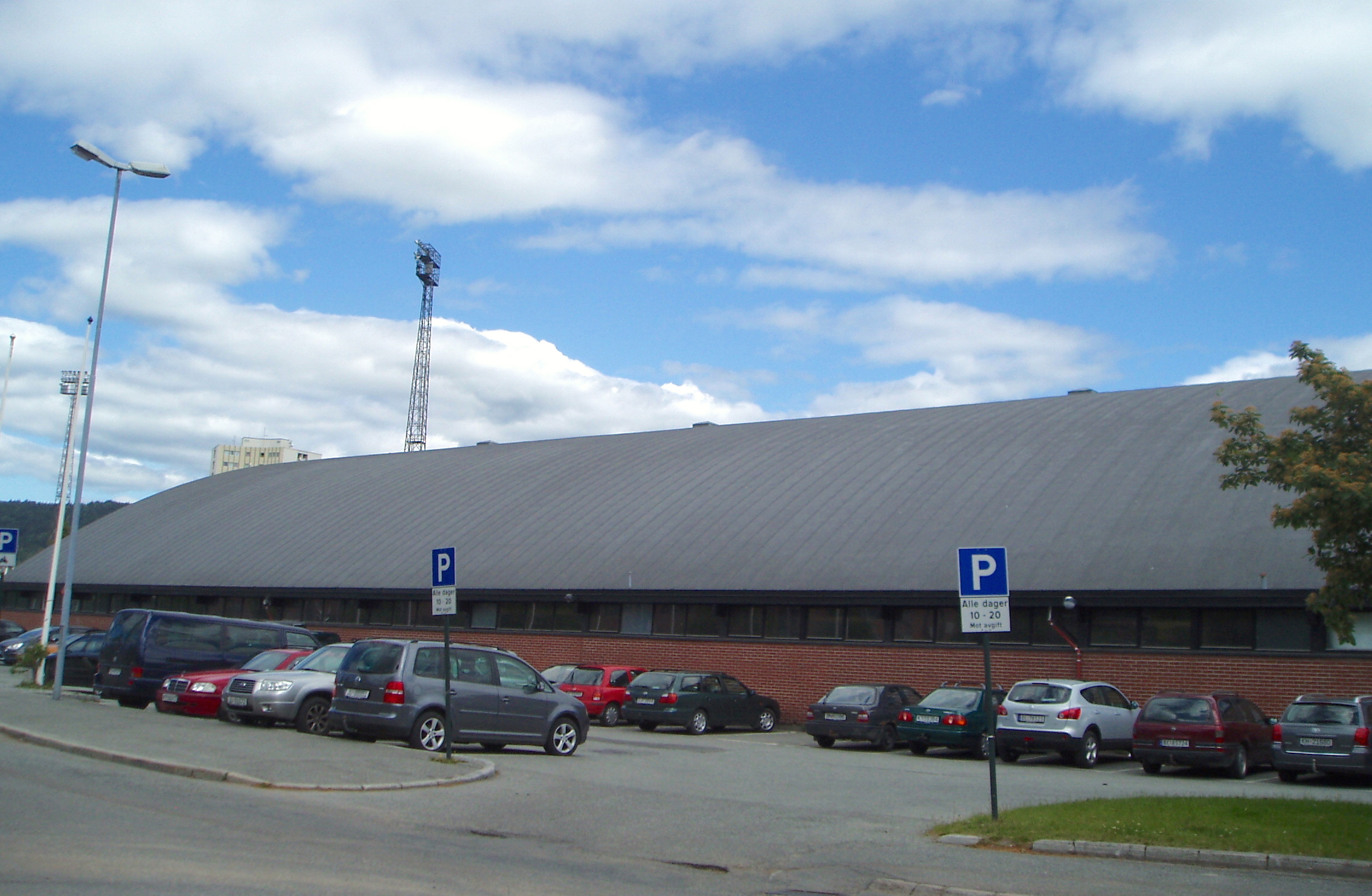
- Interactive map of Drammenshallen
- Location: Drammen, Norway
- Coordinates: 59°44′07″N 10°12′16″E
- Capacity: 4,000–6,000

Construction
- Opened: 1978
- Renovated: 1993

Tenants
- Drammen HK; Glassverket IF

Drammenshallen is an indoor arena located in Drammen, Norway. It opened in 1978 and is primarily used for handball, and to a lesser extent, track and field, trade shows, exhibitions, and in the past major concerts. Drammen HK and Glassverket IF is currently the main tenant at the facility. The capacity is approximately 4,000 or 6,000 for concerts.

== History ==
The hall was known for large concerts in the 1980s. Some of the notable artists to have performed at the venue include Duran Duran, Kiss, Elton John, Jethro Tull, Eric Clapton, Iron Maiden, Paul Simon, Thin Lizzy, Bon Jovi, Bruce Springsteen, Stevie Wonder, Bob Marley, Tina Turner, Bob Dylan and Queen.

The future of the hall remains uncertain as there are plans to replace it. The hall was a proposed venue for the 2025 World Men's Handball Championship.

== See also ==
- List of indoor arenas in Norway
- List of indoor arenas in Nordic countries
