= National Assembly of 2009 =

The National Assembly of 2009 (Icelandic: Þjóðfundur 2009) was an assembly of Icelandic citizens at the Laugardalshöll in Reykjavík on 14 November 2009 in the wake of the 2008–2011 Icelandic financial crisis, organized by a group of grassroots organizations including the Ministry of Ideas (Icelandic: Hugmyndaráðuneytið), collectively called "the Anthill" (Icelandic: Mauraþúfan).

== Organisation ==
1500 people were invited to participate in the assembly; of these, 1200 were chosen at random from the national registry, while 300 were representatives of companies, institutions and other groups.

Divided into 162 working groups of 9 each including trained moderators, participants discussed the values underpinning Icelandic society, the direction Iceland should be taking in the future, and other issues. In the end, it was determined that the most important value was integrity / honesty, followed by equal rights, respect and justice, then love, responsibility, freedom, sustainability and democracy, with family, equality and trust also being considered important. Other topics discussed included education, family, welfare, economy, environment, sustainability, opportunities, and public administration.

Participants represented a cross section of Icelandic society, ranging in age from 18 to 88 and spanning all six constituencies of Iceland, with 73, 77, 89, 365 and 621 people attending from the Northwest, Northeast, South, Southwest and Reykjavík (combined), respectively; 47% of the attendants were women, while 53% were men. Participants not from the Reykjavík area were flown in for free; the event's total cost of 27 million ISK was covered by individuals, companies and other institutions, with the Icelandic government contributing 7 million ISK.

The event was followed by both Icelandic and international media, with journalists from The Economist and other media attending.
