= List of indoor arenas in Nordic countries =

The following is an incomplete list of indoor arenas in Nordic countries with a capacity of at least 5,000.

== Current arenas ==
#	Arena	Capacity	City	Opened	Image
1	Telenor Arena	15,000	(Norway) Bærum	2009	
2	Avicii Arena	13,850	(Sweden) Stockholm	1989	
3	Nokia Arena	13,455	(Finland) Tampere	2021	
4	Veikkaus Arena	13,349	(Finland) Helsinki	1997	
5	Royal Arena	13,000	(Denmark) Copenhagen	2017	
6	Malmö Arena	12,600	(Sweden) Malmö	2008	
7	Scandinavium	12,044	(Sweden) Gothenburg	1971	
8	Trondheim Spektrum	12,000	(Norway) Trondheim	1956	
9	Jyske Bank Boxen	12,000	(Denmark) Herning	2010	
10	Gatorade Center	11,820	(Finland) Turku	1990	
11	Håkons Hall	11,500	(Norway) Lillehammer	1993	
12	B&W Hallerne	11,000	(Denmark) Refshaleøen	1960s	
13	Vikingskipet	10,600	(Norway) Hamar	1992	
14	Forum Copenhagen	10,000	(Denmark) Frederiksberg	1926	
15	Ballerup Super Arena	9,200	(Denmark) Ballerup	2001	
16	ABB Arena	9,000	(Sweden) Västerås	2007	
17	Löfbergs Arena	8,646	(Sweden) Karlstad	2001	
18	Monitor ERP Arena	8,620	(Sweden) Gävle	2006	
19	Oslo Spektrum	8,600	(Norway) Oslo	1990	
20	Saab Arena	8,500	(Sweden) Linköping	2004	
21	Helsinki Ice Hall	8,200	(Finland) Helsinki	1966	
22	Hovet	8,094	(Sweden) Stockholm	1955	
23	Tampere Ice Stadium	7,800	(Finland) Tampere	1965	
24	Tegera Arena	7,650	(Sweden) Leksand	2005	
25	Hägglunds Arena	7,600	(Sweden) Örnsköldsvik	2006	
26	Frölundaborg	7,600	(Sweden) Gothenburg	1967	
27	Espoo Metro Areena	7,017	(Finland) Espoo	1999	
28	Kinnarps Arena	7,000	(Sweden) Jönköping	2000	
29	Oulun Energia Areena	6,614	(Finland) Oulu	1975	
30	Isomäki Areena	6,350	(Finland) Pori	1971	
31	Nobelhallen	6,300	(Sweden) Karlskoga	1971	
32	Scaniarinken	6,200	(Sweden) Södertälje	1970	
33	Coop Norrbotten Arena	6,150	(Sweden) Luleå	1970	
34	NHK Arena	6,000	(Sweden) Timrå	1966	
35	Lumon arena	5,950	(Finland) Kouvola	1982	
36	Vida Arena	5,750	(Sweden) Växjö	2011	
37	Laugardalshöll	5,500	(Iceland) Reykjavík	1965	
38	Lappi Areena	5,500	(Finland) Rovaniemi	2003	
39	Äijänsuo Arena	5,400	(Finland) Rauma	1970	
40	Isku Areena	5,371	(Finland) Lahti	1973	
41	Nye Jordal Amfi	5,300	(Norway) Oslo	2020	
42	Niiralan Monttu	5,064	(Finland) Kuopio	1979	
43	NKT Arena Karlskrona	5,050	(Sweden) Karlskrona	2005	
44	Catena Arena	5,045	(Sweden) Ängelholm	2008	
45	Gigantium	5,000	(Denmark) Aalborg	1999	
46	Ceres Arena	5,000	(Denmark) Aarhus	2001	
47	Arena Arctica	5,000	(Sweden) Kiruna	2000	

== Proposed arenas ==
Arena	Capacity	City
Suvilahti Arena	17,000	(Finland) Helsinki
Arena 3.3	17,000	(Finland) Vantaa
New Scandinavium Arena	16,000	(Sweden) Gothenburg
Helsinki Garden	14,000	(Finland) Helsinki
New Drammen Arena	12,000	(Norway) Drammen
Bergen Byarena	11,000	(Norway) Bergen
Oulu Arena	10,000	(Finland) Oulu
Uppsala Eventcenter	10,000	(Sweden) Uppsala
Ratapiha Arena	10,000	(Finland) Turku
New Hovet Arena	10,000	(Sweden) Stockholm
Þjóðarhöll	8,600	(Iceland) Reykjavík

== See also ==
- List of indoor arenas by capacity
- List of indoor arenas in Europe
- Lists of stadiums
