= Þjóðarhöll =

Proposed indoor arena

- Rendering of the proposed arena
- Interactive map of Þjóðarhöll
- Location: Laugardalur, Reykjavík, Iceland
- Coordinates: 64.139240°N 21.877844°W
- Owner: City of Reykjavík
- Capacity: 8,600 seats

Construction
- Groundbreaking: 2026 (projected)
- Opened: 2029–2030 (projected)
- Cost: 16.8 billion ISK (projected)
- Architects: ASK; LPO; Landhönnun; COWI A/S; Ísloft; EOH; Finnbog Pétursson
- General contractor: Íslenskir aðalverktakar (ÍAV)

Website
- Official website

Þjóðarhöll is a planned multi-purpose sports facility to be built in the Laugardalur district of Iceland's capital Reykjavík. A letter of intent was signed in May 2022 for its construction. The new 8,600-seat indoor arena will form part of the existing Laugardalshöll complex.

== Background and history ==
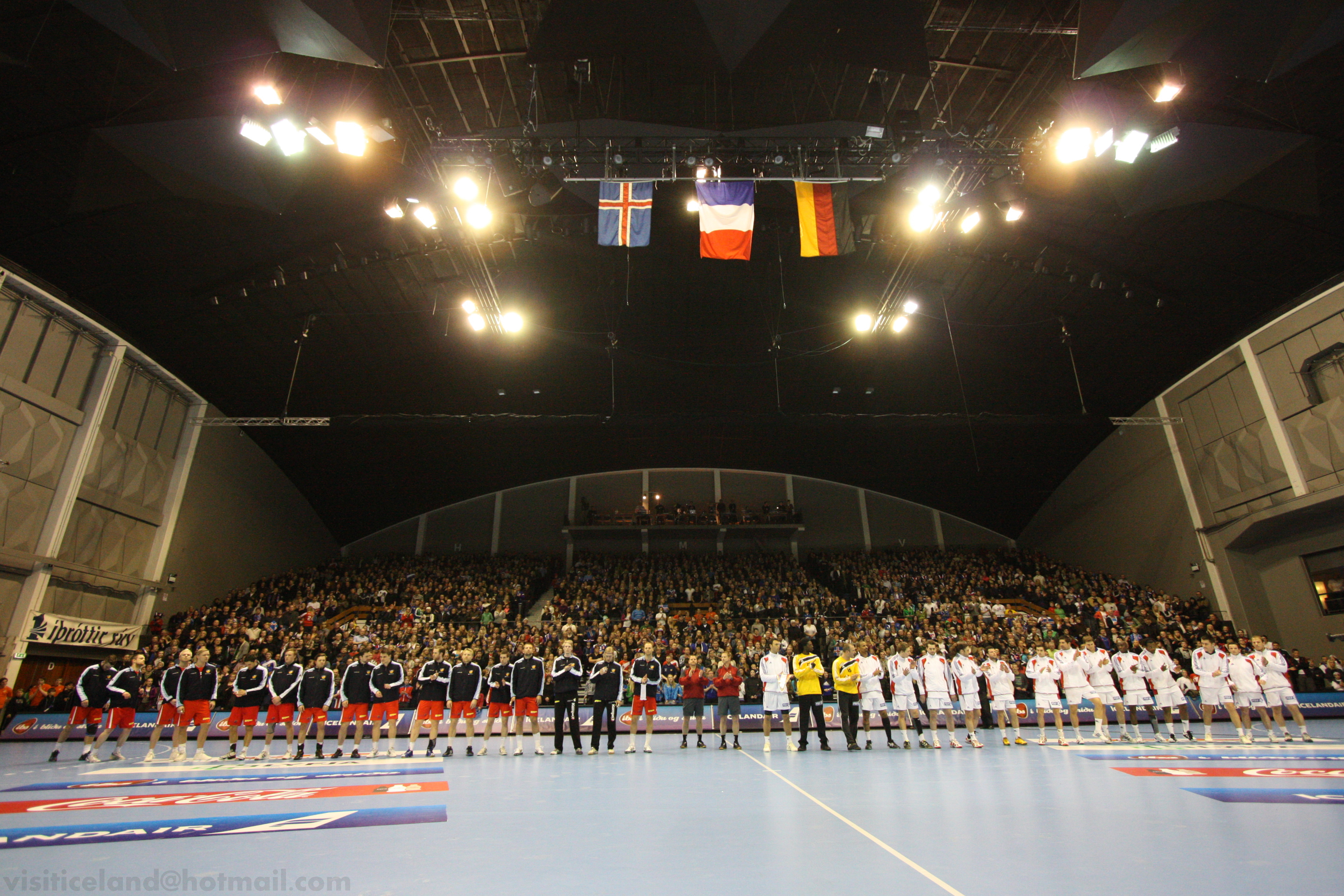
Laugardalshöll is the city's oldest indoor arena; the venue is outdated and lacks the capacity to host large-scale events

In July 1994, the daily newspaper Morgunblaðið reported that discussions with Ingibjörg Sólrún Gísladóttir, the then mayor of Reykjavík, had taken place regarding the possible modernization or replacement of Laugardalshöll ahead of the city hosting the 1995 World Men's Handball Championship. Officials decided to add an extension to the east side of the building to increase the number of spectator seats to around 5,500 for the tournament. Afterwards, the extension was converted into a small gym for basketball but now houses conference and storage rooms. In 2017, during the ÍBR Congress organised by the Reykjavík Sports Association (ÍBR), it was agreed to launch a feasibility study on the construction of a new multi-purpose sports hall in Laugardalur, but this was rejected for cost reasons. It has been pointed out that the city's current venue does not meet modern sports standards and is in fact "obsolete and illegal" for international handball and basketball competitions but these are played in the hall due to an exemption from international federations. Issues with the existing venue include the "security area", the floor area which is too small and insufficient access for journalists, media and spectators.

In January 2020 Lilja Dögg Alfreðsdóttir, Minister of Education, Science and Culture, appointed a working group to make proposals for a new "national stadium for indoor sports". Initial proposals were expected to be submitted before May of that year. In April 2022, a committee concluded that a new venue should have either a seated capacity of 5,000 or 8,600 (expandable up to 12,000 for concerts), which would satisfy the requirements needed for handball and basketball. The smaller venue would cost 7.9 billion ISK, while the larger one would cost 8.7 billion ISK. The new arena would be concurrent with Norway's Trondheim Spektrum. The city has reserved 2 billion ISK for the project. In May, the city and the government agreed to making a new arena for the national teams that would be shared with sports clubs Þróttur and Ármann as-well as the schools in the neighbourhood. The city would cover cost equal to the needs of the schools and sports clubs and the government covers cost of any additional facilities needed by the national teams. A construction committee will handle the project, ask for designs and the arena was expected to be fully constructed by 2025.

In January 2023, the estimated cost estimate was increased to 14.2 billion ISK and a decision was made to build a new venue with a capacity of 8,600. The building is planned just south of existing Laugardalshöll buildings with a connecting building in-between them. In March Reykjavík announced a new site plan, featuring the positioning of the venue. In September 2023, the chairman of the preparations committee for the new venue updated the estimate of finishing construction to either the end of 2026 or the beginning of 2027, stating that the venue will not be built by the end of 2025. On 8 March 2024, the government and Reykjavik announced a competition for the construction and design of the new venue, with the winner being chosen in June and advertised it in the European Economic Area. Each proposal needs to consist of an architect/designer, engineer and a contractor, an unusual practice in Iceland. The winning proposal is expected to be announced in January 2025. In August, the Icelandic Planning Agency concluded that the proposed venue would not require an environmental impact assessment.

In December 2024, three teams consisting of local and international companies were announced as those selected to take part in the competitive tender. In June 2026, a tender for a contractor was approved. Two final offers were submitted for this contract, from consortiums led by Íslenski Aðalverktök (ÍAV) and Ístak, with ÍAV chosen as the winning bidder. The competing team included, consulting engineers EFLA, the Nordic Office of Architecture, and global firm Populous. The new arena will be up to 19,000 square meters and located just south of the current complex of venues. The proposed arena is a collaboration between the contractor ÍAV, architectural firms ASK and LPO, landscape designers at Landhönnun, MEP consultants at COWI A/S, industrial company Ísloft, supplier EOH and artist Finnbogi Pétursson. Provided there are no objections or other related issues that further delay the project, construction work is expected to begin in the fall of 2026. In September 2026, the city council approved the contract which states that the new arena should be completed no later than 25 January 2030.

It is planned that the new 8,600-seat "national hall" will be put into use between 2029 and 2030, in the hope that it could host matches of the World Men's Handball Championship in 2031 as part of a joint bid with Denmark and Norway; it is a prerequisite to meet the tournament’s minimum requirements for hosting. It is also expected to host public events and community activities alongside concerts and exhibitions. In March 2024, the cost of the project was estimated to be around 15 billion ISK, but this later increased to 16.8 billion ISK. The cost will be split between the state (55%) and the city of Reykjavík (45%).

== See also ==
- Laugardalshöll
