= Handball at the 1980 Summer Olympics – Women's tournament =

Handball at the Olympics

1980 Women's Olympic handball tournament
Tournament details
- Host country: Soviet Union
- Venues: 2 (in 1 host city)
- Dates: 21–29 July 1980
- Teams: 6

Final positions
- Champions: Soviet Union (2nd title)
- Runners-up: Yugoslavia
- Third place: East Germany
- Fourth place: Hungary

Tournament statistics
- Matches played: 15
- Goals scored: 488 (32.53 per match)
- Top scorers: (Socialist Federal Republic of Yugoslavia) Biserka Višnjić (33 goals)

The women's tournament was one of two handball tournaments at the 1980 Summer Olympics. It was the second appearance of a women's handball tournament at the Olympic Games.

== Qualification ==
Qualification	Date	Host	Berths	Qualified
Host nation	23 October 1974	(Austria) Vienna	1	Soviet Union
1978 World Championship	30 November – 10 December 1978	Czechoslovakia	4	East Germany; Hungary; Czechoslovakia; Yugoslavia
Intercontinental qualification	15–20 March 1980	(Republic of the Congo) Brazzaville	1	~~South Korea~~; Congo
Total			6	

== Results ==
Pos	Team	Pld	W	D	L	GF	GA	GD	Pts
1st place, gold medalist(s)	Soviet Union (H)	5	5	0	0	99	52	+47	10
2nd place, silver medalist(s)	Yugoslavia	5	3	1	1	107	67	+40	7
3rd place, bronze medalist(s)	East Germany	5	3	1	1	91	58	+33	7
4	Hungary	5	1	1	3	80	74	+6	3
5	Czechoslovakia	5	1	1	3	65	78	−13	3
6	Republic of the Congo	5	0	0	5	46	159	−113	0

(H) Hosts

21 July 1980; 17:00	Soviet Union	30–11	Republic of the Congo	Sokolniki Arena
21 July 1980; 17:00	Kocherhina, Odynokova 8	(17–4)	Koulinka 5	Sokolniki Arena

21 July 1980; 18:30	East Germany	16–10	Czechoslovakia	Dynamo Sports Palace
21 July 1980; 18:30	Richter 4	(8–6)	Foltýnová, Kuťková 3	Dynamo Sports Palace

21 July 1980; 20:00	Hungary	10–19	Yugoslavia	Dynamo Sports Palace
21 July 1980; 20:00	Csulik 4	(4–8)	Višnjić 5	Dynamo Sports Palace

23 July 1980; 17:00	Soviet Union	17–7	Czechoslovakia	Sokolniki Arena
23 July 1980; 17:00	Odynokova 5	(8–4)	Foltýnová 5	Sokolniki Arena

23 July 1980; 18:30	Hungary	39–10	Republic of the Congo	Dynamo Sports Palace
23 July 1980; 18:30	Nagy 13	(19–6)	Koulinka 7	Dynamo Sports Palace

23 July 1980; 20:00	East Germany	15–15	Yugoslavia	Dynamo Sports Palace
23 July 1980; 20:00	Röther 4	(8–6)	Višnjić 10	Dynamo Sports Palace

25 July 1980; 17:00	Soviet Union	16–12	Hungary	Sokolniki Arena
25 July 1980; 17:00	Kocherhina 9	(9–5)	Nagy, Sterbinszky 4	Sokolniki Arena

25 July 1980; 18:30	East Germany	28–6	Republic of the Congo	Dynamo Sports Palace
25 July 1980; 18:30	Matz 6	(15–4)	Koulinka 3	Dynamo Sports Palace

25 July 1980; 20:00	Czechoslovakia	15–25	Yugoslavia	Dynamo Sports Palace
25 July 1980; 20:00	Kuťková 6	(7–13)	Višnjić 9	Dynamo Sports Palace

27 July 1980; 17:00	Soviet Union	18–9	Yugoslavia	Sokolniki Arena
27 July 1980; 17:00	Karlova 8	(10–4)	Kitić 6	Sokolniki Arena

27 July 1980; 18:30	Czechoslovakia	23–10	Republic of the Congo	Dynamo Sports Palace
27 July 1980; 18:30	Kuťková 9	(9–3)	three players 2	Dynamo Sports Palace

27 July 1980; 20:00	East Germany	19–9	Hungary	Dynamo Sports Palace
27 July 1980; 20:00	Röther 6	(9–3)	Nagy 4	Dynamo Sports Palace

29 July 1980; 13:00	Yugoslavia	39–9	Republic of the Congo	Sokolniki Arena
29 July 1980; 13:00	Kitić 14	(16–5)	four players 2	Sokolniki Arena

29 July 1980; 14:30	Hungary	10–10	Czechoslovakia	Sokolniki Arena
29 July 1980; 14:30	Nagy 3	(3–6)	Kuťková 4	Sokolniki Arena

29 July 1980; 18:30	East Germany	13–18	Soviet Union	Sokolniki Arena
29 July 1980; 18:30	Richter 6	(6–7)	Zubaryeva 8	Sokolniki Arena

== Top goalscorers ==
Rank	Name	Goals
1	(Socialist Federal Republic of Yugoslavia) Biserka Višnjić	33
2	(Socialist Federal Republic of Yugoslavia) Svetlana Kitić	29
3	(Soviet Union) Tetyana Kocherhina	28
4	(Hungary) Marianna Nagy	26
5	(Czechoslovakia) Jana Kuťková	22
6	(Soviet Union) Olha Zubaryeva	21
7	(Soviet Union) Larysa Karlova	19
7	(Republic of the Congo) Solange Koulinka	19
7	(East Germany) Kristina Richter	19
7	(East Germany) Sabine Röther	19

== Team rosters ==
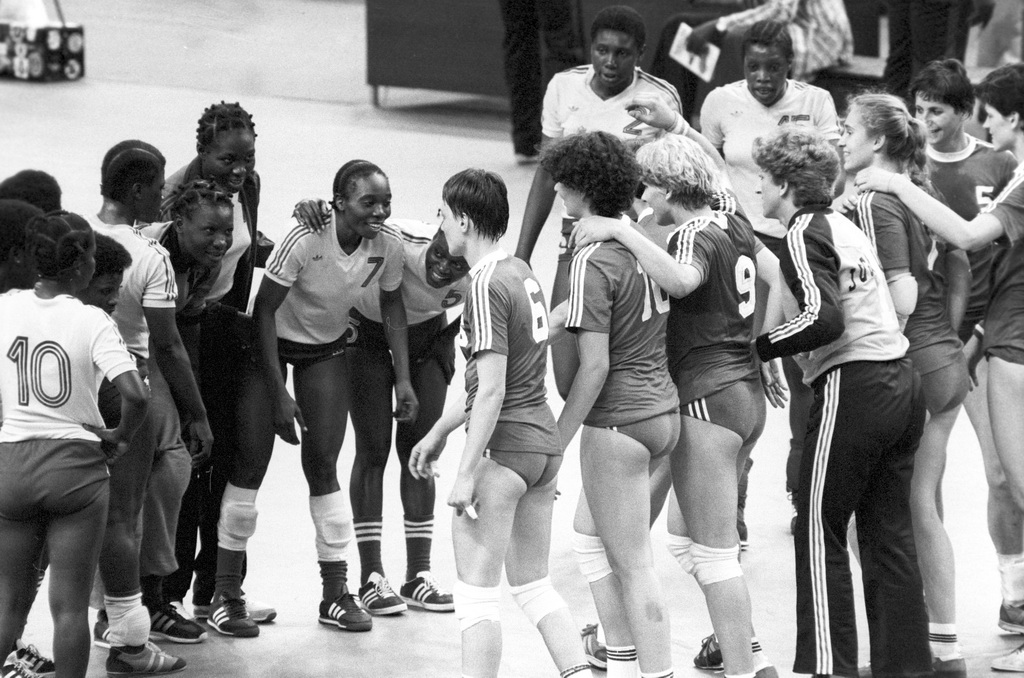
Handball Congo vs. SFRY - 1980 Summer Olympics - Moscou

Republic of the Congo	Czechoslovakia	East Germany
Angélique Abemane; Isabelle Azanga; Pascaline Bobeka; Germaine Djimbi; Yolande Kada-Gango; Henriette Koula; Solange Koulinka; Pemba Lopez; Yvonne Makouala; Julienne Malaki; Madeleine Mitsotso; Nicole Oba; Micheline Okemba; Viviane Okoula	Elena Boledovičová; Elena Brezányiová; Věra Datínská; Milena Foltýnová; Alena Horalová; Petra Komínková; Mária Končeková; Jana Kuťková; Katarína Lamrichová; Jolana Neméthová; Daniela Trandžíková-Nováková; Viola Pavlasová; Priska Polačeková Mária Beňová	Birgit Heinecke; Roswitha Krause; Waltraud Kretzschmar; Katrin Krüger; Kornelia Kunisch; Evelyn Matz; Kristina Richter; Christina Rost; Sabine Röther; Renate Rudolph; Marion Tietz; Petra Uhlig; Claudia Wunderlich; Hannelore Zober
Hungary	Soviet Union	Yugoslavia
Éva Angyal (Vasas SC); Erzsébet Balogh (Budapest Spartacus SC); Mária Berzsenyi (FTC); Klára Bonyhádi (Építők SC); Piroska Budai (Bakony Vegyész); Erzsébet Csajbók (FTC); Klára Csík (Vasas SC); Éva Csulik (FTC); Rozália Lelkes (FTC); Ilona Mihályka (Vasas SC); Marianna Nagy (Vasas SC); Györgyi Őri (Vasas SC); Amália Sterbinszky (Vasas SC); Mária Vadász (Vasas SC)	Larysa Karlova; Tetyana Kocherhina; Valentyna Lutayeva; Aldona Nenėnienė; Lyubov Odynokova; Iryna Palchykova; Lyudmila Poradnyk; Yuliya Safina; Larisa Savkina; Sigita Strečen; Zinaida Turchyna; Nataliya Tymoshkina; Olha Zubaryeva; Coach: Igor Turchyn Natalya Lukyanenko	Svetlana Anastasovska (ORK Beograd); Mirjana Đurica (Bane Sekulić Sombor); Radmila Drljača (Radnički Beograd); Katica Ileš (Osijek); Slavica Jeremić (Radnički Beograd); Svetlana Kitić (Radnički Beograd); Jasna Merdan (Lokomotiva Mostar); Vesna Milošević (DIN Niš); Mirjana Ognjenović (Trešnjevka Zagreb); Vesna Radović (Radnički Beograd); Radmila Savić (ORK Beograd); Ana Titlić (Lokomotiva Zagreb); Biserka Višnjić (Trešnjevka Zagreb); Zorica Vojinović (Bane Sekulić Sombor); Coach: Josip Samaržija
