= Republic of the Congo at the 1980 Summer Olympics =

- Flag of the People's Republic of the Congo
- IOC code: CGO
- NOC: Comité National Olympique et Sportif Congolais

in Moscow. Soviet Union July 19–August 3, 1980
- Competitors: 24(5 Men, 19 Women) in 3 sports
- Flag bearer: Solange Koulinka
- Medals: Gold 0 Silver 0 Bronze 0 Total 0

Summer Olympics appearances (overview)
- 1964; 1968; 1972; 1976; 1980; 1984; 1988; 1992; 1996; 2000; 2004; 2008; 2012; 2016; 2020; 2024

The People's Republic of the Congo competed at the 1980 Summer Olympics in Moscow, USSR. The nation returned to the Olympic Games after boycotting the 1976 Summer Olympics.

== Results by event ==
=== Athletics ===
Men's 100 metres

- Théophile Nkounkou
  - Heat — 10.53
  - Quarterfinals — 10.59 (→ did not advance)
- Antoine Kiakouama
  - Heat — 10.69 (→ did not advance)

Men's 200 metres

- Théophile Nkounkou
  - Heat — did not start (→ did not advance)

Men's Marathon

- Emmanuel Mpioh
  - Final — 2:48:17 (→ 52nd place)

Men's 110 m Hurdles

- Bernard Mabikana
  - Heat — 15.42 (→ did not advance)

=== Boxing ===
Men's Lightweight (60 kg)

- Alphonse Matoubela
  1. First Round — Lost to Tibor Dezamits (Hungary) on points (0-5)

=== Handball ===
==== Women's team competition ====
- Preliminary Round Robin
  - Lost to Soviet Union (30-11)
  - Lost to Hungary (39-10)
  - Lost to GDR (28-6)
  - Lost to Czechoslovakia (23-10)
  - Lost to Yugoslavia (39-9) → 6th place
- Team Roster
  - Angélique Abemane
  - Isabelle Azanga
  - Pascaline Bobeka
  - Germaine Djimbi
  - Yolande Kada-Gango
  - Henriette Koula
  - Solange Koulinka
  - Pemba Lopez
  - Yvonne Makouala
  - Julienne Malaki
  - Madeleine Mitsotso
  - Nicole Oba
  - Micheline Okemba
  - Viviane Okoula
