= National team appearances in the World Women's Handball Championship =

This article lists the performances of each of the 50 national teams which have made at least one appearance in the IHF World Women's Handball Championship finals.

== Debut of teams ==
Each successive World Women's Handball Championship has had at least one team appearing for the first time. Teams in parentheses are considered successor teams by IHF.

Year	Debutants	Total
1957	Austria, Czechoslovakia, Denmark, Hungary, Poland, Romania, Sweden, West Germany, Yugoslavia	9
1962	Japan, Soviet Union	2
1965		0
1971	East Germany, Netherlands, Norway	3
1973		0
1975	Tunisia, United States	2
1978	Algeria, Canada, South Korea	3
1982	Bulgaria, Congo	2
1986	China, France	2
1990	Angola	1
1993	(Germany), Lithuania, (Russia), Spain	4
1995	Brazil, Croatia, (Czech Republic), Ivory Coast, Slovakia, Ukraine	6
1997	Belarus, Macedonia, Slovenia, Uruguay, Uzbekistan	5
1999	Argentina, Australia, Cuba	3
2001	Greenland, Italy, (Serbia and Montenegro)	3
2003		0
2005		0
2007	Dominican Republic, Kazakhstan, Paraguay	3
2009	Chile, Thailand	2
2011	Iceland, (Montenegro)	2
2013	DR Congo, (Serbia)	2
2015	Puerto Rico	1
2017		0
2019	Senegal	1
2021	Iran	1
2023		0
2025	Egypt, Faroe Islands, Switzerland	3

== Participation details ==
Legend

- 1st – Champions
- 2nd – Runners-up
- 3rd – Third place
- 4th – Fourth place
- 5th – Fifth place
- 6th – Sixth place
- 7th – Seventh place
- 8th – Eighth place
- 9th – Ninth place
- 10th – Tenth place
- 11th – Eleventh place
- 12th – Twelfth place
- MR – Main round
- GS – Group stage
- Q – Qualified for upcoming tournament
- •• – Qualified but withdrew
- • – Did not qualify
- × – Did not enter / Withdrew from the World Championship / Banned
- – Hosts

For each tournament, the number of teams in each finals tournament (in brackets) are shown.

Team	(Socialist Federal Republic of Yugoslavia); 1957	(Romania); 1962	(West Germany); 1965	(Netherlands); 1971	(Socialist Federal Republic of Yugoslavia); 1973	(Soviet Union); 1975	(Czechoslovakia); 1978	(Hungary); 1982	(Netherlands); 1986	(South Korea); 1990	(Norway); 1993	(Austria) (Hungary); 1995	(Germany); 1997	(Denmark) (Norway); 1999	(Italy); 2001	(Croatia); 2003	(Russia); 2005	(France); 2007	(China); 2009	(Brazil); 2011	(Serbia); 2013	(Denmark); 2015	(Germany); 2017	(Japan); 2019	(Spain); 2021	(Denmark) (Norway) (Sweden); 2023	(Germany) (Netherlands); 2025	(Hungary); 2027	(Spain); 2029	(Czech Republic) (Poland); 2031	Total
Algeria	France		×	×	×	×	10th	•	•	•	•	•	19th	×	•	•	×	×	•	•	22nd	•	•	•	×	•	•				3
Angola	Part of Portugal					×	×	•	•	16th	16th	13th	15th	15th	13th	17th	16th	7th	11th	8th	16th	16th	19th	15th	25th	15th	10th				18
Argentina	×	×	×	×	×	•	•	•	•	•	•	•	•	24th	•	22nd	20th	20th	19th	23rd	19th	18th	23rd	16th	21st	20th	22nd				13
Australia	×	×	×	×	×	•	•	•	•	•	•	•	•	23rd	•	23rd	24th	24th	24th	24th	24th	•	×	24th	×	•	×				8
Austria	6th	×	×	×	•	•	•	•	12th	5th	8th	8th	11th	3rd	7th	11th	13th	16th	10th	•	•	•	•	•	16th	19th	16th				15
Belarus	Part of Soviet Union										•	•	16th	14th	•	•	•	•	•	•	•	•	•	•	•	×	×				2
Brazil	×	×	×	×	×	•	•	•	•	•	•	17th	23rd	16th	12th	20th	7th	14th	15th	5th	1st	10th	18th	17th	6th	9th	6th				16
Bulgaria	×	×	×	•	•	•	•	10th	•	12th	•	•	•	•	•	•	•	•	•	•	•	•	•	•	×	•	•				2
Cameroon	FRA	×	×	×	×	×	•	×	•	•	×	×	•	•	•	•	22nd	•	•	•	•	•	20th	•	28th	24th	•				4
Canada	×	×	×	×	×	•	10th	•	•	15th	•	17th	20th	•	•	•	•	•	•	•	•	•	•	•	×	•	•				4
Chile	×	×	×	×	×	•	•	•	•	•	•	•	•	•	•	•	•	•	23rd	•	•	•	•	•	•	27th	•				2
China	×	×	×	×	×	×	×	•	9th	8th	14th	13th	22nd	18th	11th	19th	17th	21st	12th	21st	18th	17th	22nd	23rd	32nd	28th	26th				19
Congo	FRA	×	×	×	×	×	×	12th	••	•	•	•	•	22nd	22nd	•	•	17th	20th	•	•	•	•	•	23rd	26th	•				7
Croatia	Part of Yugoslavia										•	10th	6th	•	•	14th	11th	9th	•	7th	•	•	•	•	18th	14th	25th				9
Cuba	×	×	×	×	×	•	•	•	•	•	•	•	•	21st	•	•	•	•	•	22nd	•	23rd	•	21st	×	•	30th				5
Czech Republic	See Czechoslovakia											13th	13th	19th	•	15th	•	•	•	•	15th	•	8th	•	19th	8th	18th			Q	10
DR Congo	BEL	×	×	×	×	×	×	×	×	×	•	×	×	×	×	•	•	•	•	•	20th	24th	•	20th	•	•	•				3
Denmark	5th	2nd	5th	6th	7th	9th	•	•	•	10th	2nd	3rd	1st	6th	4th	13th	4th	•	5th	4th	3rd	6th	6th	9th	3rd	3rd	5th				23
Dominican Republic	×	×	×	×	×	•	•	•	•	•	•	•	•	•	•	•	•	22nd	•	•	23rd	•	•	•	×	×	×				2
Egypt	×	×	×	×	×	•	•	•	•	•	×	×	×	×	×	×	•	×	×	•	•	×	×	×	×	•	28th				1
Faroe Islands	×	×	×	×	×	×	×	×	×	×	×	×	×	×	•	×	×	×	×	×	×	×	•	•	•	•	17th				1
France	×	×	×	×	×	•	•	•	15th	14th	•	•	10th	2nd	5th	1st	12th	5th	2nd	2nd	6th	7th	1st	13th	2nd	1st	3rd				17
Germany (including West Germany)	4th	8th	3rd	5th	11th	•	8th	9th	7th	4th	1st	5th	3rd	7th	•	12th	6th	3rd	7th	17th	7th	13th	12th	8th	7th	6th	2nd				25
Greenland	×	×	×	×	×	•	•	•	•	•	•	•	•	•	24th	•	•	•	•	•	•	•	•	•	•	32nd	×				2
Hungary	2nd	5th	1st	3rd	4th	3rd	3rd	2nd	8th	•	7th	2nd	9th	5th	6th	2nd	3rd	8th	9th	•	8th	11th	15th	14th	10th	10th	7th	Q			26
Iceland	×	×	×	×	×	×	×	×	•	•	•	•	•	•	•	•	•	•	•	12th	•	•	•	•	•	25th	21st				3
Iran	×	×	×	×	×	•	×	×	•	×	•	×	×	×	•	×	×	×	×	•	•	•	•	•	31st	31st	32nd				3
Italy	×	×	×	×	×	•	•	•	•	•	•	•	•	•	16th	•	•	•	•	•	•	•	•	•	•	•	•				1
Ivory Coast	×	×	×	×	×	×	•	•	•	•	•	17th	14th	20th	•	21st	21st	•	18th	16th	•	×	•	•	×	•	×				7
Japan	×	9th	7th	9th	10th	10th	•	•	14th	•	•	13th	17th	17th	20th	16th	18th	19th	16th	14th	14th	19th	16th	10th	11th	17th	13th				22
Kazakhstan	Part of Soviet Union										•	×	×	×	•	••	×	18th	22nd	19th	•	22nd	•	22nd	24th	30th	31st				8
Lithuania	Part of Soviet Union										13th	•	•	•	•	•	•	•	•	•	•	•	•	•	•	×	×				1
Montenegro	Part of Yugoslavia										Part of Serbia and Montenegro							•	•	10th	11th	8th	6th	5th	22nd	7th	8th				8
Netherlands	×	×	•	8th	12th	•	9th	•	10th	•	•	•	•	10th	14th	•	5th	•	•	15th	13th	2nd	3rd	1st	9th	5th	4th				15
North Macedonia	Part of Yugoslavia										•	•	7th	8th	21st	•	15th	12th	•	•	•	•	•	•	•	•	•				5
Norway	×	×	•	7th	8th	8th	•	7th	3rd	6th	3rd	4th	2nd	1st	2nd	6th	9th	2nd	3rd	1st	5th	1st	2nd	4th	1st	2nd	1st				23
Paraguay	×	×	×	×	×	•	•	•	•	•	•	•	•	•	•	•	•	23rd	•	•	21st	•	21st	•	29th	29th	27th				6
Poland	7th	7th	8th	•	5th	7th	6th	•	13th	9th	10th	•	8th	11th	•	•	19th	11th	•	•	4th	4th	17th	•	15th	16th	11th			Q	20
Puerto Rico	×	×	×	×	×	•	•	•	•	•	•	•	•	•	•	•	•	•	•	•	•	20th	•	•	20th	×	•				2
Romania	9th	1st	6th	4th	2nd	4th	7th	8th	5th	7th	4th	7th	12th	4th	17th	10th	2nd	4th	8th	13th	10th	3rd	10th	12th	13th	12th	9th				27
Russia	See Soviet Union										5th	6th	4th	12th	1st	7th	1st	1st	1st	6th	•	5th	5th	3rd	8th	×	×				14
Senegal	FRA	×	×	×	×	•	×	×	•	×	•	×	×	×	•	×	×	×	×	•	•	•	•	18th	•	18th	24th				3
Serbia	Part of Yugoslavia										See Serbia and Montenegro							•	•	•	2nd	15th	9th	6th	12th	21st	12th				7
Slovakia	Part of Czechoslovakia											12th	•	•	•	•	•	•	•	•	•	•	•	•	26th	•	•				2
Slovenia	Part of Yugoslavia										•	•	18th	•	9th	8th	14th	•	•	•	•	•	14th	19th	17th	11th	•				8
South Korea	×	×	×	×	×	•	10th	6th	11th	11th	11th	1st	5th	9th	15th	3rd	8th	6th	6th	11th	12th	14th	13th	11th	14th	22nd	23rd				21
Spain	×	×	×	×	×	•	•	•	•	•	15th	•	•	•	10th	5th	•	10th	4th	3rd	9th	12th	11th	2nd	4th	13th	14th		Q		14
Sweden	8th	×	•	•	•	•	•	•	•	13th	6th	11th	•	•	8th	•	•	•	13th	9th	•	9th	4th	7th	5th	4th	15th				13
Switzerland	×	×	×	×	×	×	•	•	•	•	•	•	•	×	×	•	•	•	•	•	•	•	•	•	•	•	19th				1
Thailand	×	×	×	×	×	×	×	×	×	×	×	×	×	×	×	×	×	×	21st	•	×	×	×	×	×	•	×				1
Tunisia	×	×	×	×	×	12th	•	•	•	•	•	•	×	×	19th	18th	•	15th	14th	18th	17th	21st	24th	•	27th	•	20th				11
Ukraine	Part of Soviet Union										•	9th	•	13th	18th	4th	10th	13th	17th	•	•	•	•	•	•	23rd	•				8
United States	×	×	×	×	×	11th	•	11th	16th	•	12th	17th	•	•	•	•	•	•	•	•	•	•	•	•	•	•					5
Uruguay	×	×	×	×	×	•	•	•	•	•	•	•	24th	•	23rd	24th	23rd	•	•	20th	•	•	•	•	•	•	29th				6
Uzbekistan	Part of Soviet Union										×	×	21st	×	×	•	×	×	•	•	•	•	•	×	30th	•	×				2
Discontinued teams
Czechoslovakia	1st	3rd	4th	•	6th	6th	4th	5th	2nd	•	9th	See Czech Republic																			9
East Germany	×	•	•	1st	9th	1st	1st	4th	4th	3rd	See Germany																				7
Serbia and Montenegro	Part of Yugoslavia										•	•	•	•	3rd	9th	•	See Serbia													2
Soviet Union	×	6th	×	•	3rd	2nd	2nd	1st	1st	1st	See Russia																				7
Yugoslavia	3rd	4th	2nd	2nd	1st	5th	5th	3rd	6th	2nd	See Serbia																				10
Total	9	9	8	9	12	12	12	12	16	16	16	20	24	24	24	24	24	24	24	24	24	24	24	24	32	32	32	32	32	32	

== Results of host nations ==
Year	Host nation	Finish
1957	Yugoslavia	Third place
1962	Romania	Champions
1965	West Germany	Third place
1971	Netherlands	Eighth place
1973	Yugoslavia	Champions
1975	Soviet Union	Runners-up
1978	Czechoslovakia	Fourth place
1982	Hungary	Runners-up
1986	Netherlands	Tenth place
1990	South Korea	Eleventh place
1993	Norway	Third place
1995	Austria	Eighth place
1995	Hungary	Runners-up
1997	Germany	Third place
1999	Denmark	Sixth place
1999	Norway	Champions
2001	Italy	Sixteenth place
2003	Croatia	Fourteenth place
2005	Russia	Champions
2007	France	Fifth place
2009	China	Twelfth place
2011	Brazil	Fifth place
2013	Serbia	Runners-up
2015	Denmark	Sixth place
2017	Germany	Twelfth place
2019	Japan	Tenth place
2021	Spain	Fourth place
2023	Denmark	Third place
2023	Norway	Runners-up
2023	Sweden	Fourth place
2025	Germany	Runners-up
2025	Netherlands	Fourth place
2027	Hungary	TBD
2029	Spain	TBD
2031	Czech Republic	TBD
2031	Poland	TBD

== Results of defending champions ==
Year	Defending champions	Finish
1957	—	—
1962	Czechoslovakia	Third place
1965	Romania	Sixth place
1971	Hungary	Third place
1973	East Germany	Ninth place
1975	Yugoslavia	Fifth place
1978	East Germany	Champions
1982	East Germany	Fourth place
1986	Soviet Union	Champions
1990	Soviet Union	Champions
1993	Russia	Fifth place
1995	Germany	Fifth place
1997	South Korea	Fifth place
1999	Denmark	Sixth place
2001	Norway	Runners-up
2003	Russia	Seventh place
2005	France	Twelfth place
2007	Russia	Champions
2009	Russia	Champions
2011	Russia	Sixth place
2013	Norway	Fifth place
2015	Brazil	Tenth place
2017	Norway	Runners-up
2019	France	Thirteenth place
2021	Netherlands	Ninth place
2023	Norway	Runners-up
2025	France	Third place
2027	Norway	TBD
2029	TBD	TBD
2031	TBD	TBD
