= 2025 World Women's Handball Championship qualification =

The 2025 World Women's Handball Championship qualification decided who qualified for the 2025 World Women's Handball Championship in Germany and Netherlands. Excluding the previous World Championship, qualifying occurred between October 2024 and April 2025. The championship will feature 32 teams for the third time.

== Qualified teams ==
Team qualified Team failed to qualify Team withdrew or suspended Did not enter

Country	Qualified as	Qualification date	Previous appearances in tournament (Note: Bold indicates champion for that year, Italics indicates host for that year.)
Germany	Co-host	28 February 2020	15 (**1993**, 1995, 1997, 1999, 2003, 2005, 2007, 2009, 2011, 2013, 2015, 2017, 2019, 2021, 2023)
Netherlands	Co-host	28 February 2020	14 (1971, 1973, 1978, 1986, 1999, 2001, 2005, 2011, 2013, 2015, 2017, **2019**, 2021, 2023)
France	Defending champion	17 December 2023	16 (1986, 1990, 1997, 1999, 2001, **2003**, 2005, 2007, 2009, 2011, 2013, 2015, **2017**, 2019, 2021, **2023**)
Argentina	Top three of 2024 Central and South American Championship	29 November 2024	12 (1999, 2003, 2005, 2007, 2009, 2011, 2013, 2015, 2017, 2019, 2021, 2023)
Brazil	Top three of 2024 Central and South American Championship	29 November 2024	15 (1995, 1997, 1999, 2001, 2003, 2005, 2007, 2009, 2011, **2013**, 2015, 2017, 2019, 2021, 2023)
Uruguay	Top three of 2024 Central and South American Championship	30 November 2024	5 (1997, 2001, 2003, 2005, 2011)
Tunisia	Semifinalists of 2024 African Championship	4 December 2024	10 (1975, 2001, 2003, 2007, 2009, 2011, 2013, 2015, 2017, 2021)
Angola	Semifinalists of 2024 African Championship	4 December 2024	17 (1990, 1993, 1995, 1997, 1999, 2001, 2003, 2005, 2007, 2009, 2011, 2013, 2015, 2017, 2019, 2021, 2023)
Senegal	Semifinalists of 2024 African Championship	4 December 2024	2 (2019, 2023)
Egypt	Semifinalists of 2024 African Championship	4 December 2024	0 (Debut)
South Korea	Semifinalists of 2024 Asian Championship	6 December 2024	20 (1978, 1982, 1986, 1990, 1993, **1995**, 1997, 1999, 2001, 2003, 2005, 2007, 2009, 2011, 2013, 2015, 2017, 2019, 2021, 2023)
Kazakhstan	Semifinalists of 2024 Asian Championship	6 December 2024	7 (2007, 2009, 2011, 2015, 2019, 2021, 2023)
Japan	Semifinalists of 2024 Asian Championship	6 December 2024	21 (1962, 1965, 1971, 1973, 1975, 1986, 1995, 1997, 1999, 2001, 2003, 2005, 2007, 2009, 2011, 2013, 2015, 2017, 2019, 2021, 2023)
Iran	Semifinalists of 2024 Asian Championship	6 December 2024	2 (2021, 2023)
Hungary	Semifinalists of 2024 European Championship	8 December 2024	24 (1957, 1962, **1965**, 1971, 1973, 1975, 1978, 1982, 1986, 1993, 1995, 1997, 1999, 2001, 2003, 2005, 2007, 2009, 2013, 2015, 2017, 2019, 2021, 2023)
Norway	Semifinalists of 2024 European Championship	9 December 2024	22 (1971, 1973, 1975, 1982, 1986, 1990, 1993, 1995, 1997, **1999**, 2001, 2003, 2005, 2007, 2009, **2011**, 2013, **2015**, 2017, 2019, **2021**, 2023)
Denmark	Semifinalists of 2024 European Championship	11 December 2024	22 (1957, 1962, 1965, 1971, 1973, 1975, 1990, 1993, 1995, **1997**, 1999, 2001, 2003, 2005, 2009, 2011, 2013, 2015, 2017, 2019, 2021, 2023)
Iceland	European playoffs	10 April 2025	2 (2011, 2023)
Montenegro	European playoffs	12 April 2025	7 (2011, 2013, 2015, 2017, 2019, 2021, 2023)
Poland	European playoffs	12 April 2025	18 (1957, 1962, 1965, 1973, 1975, 1978, 1986, 1990, 1993, 1997, 1999, 2005, 2007, 2013, 2015, 2017, 2021, 2023)
Austria	European playoffs	13 April 2025	14 (1957, 1986, 1990, 1993, 1995, 1997, 1999, 2001, 2003, 2005, 2007, 2009, 2021, 2023)
Czech Republic	European playoffs	13 April 2025	9 (1995, 1997, 1999, 2003, 2013, 2017, 2021, 2023)
Spain	European playoffs	13 April 2025	12 (1993, 2001, 2003, 2007, 2009, 2011, 2013, 2015, 2017, 2019, 2021, 2023)
Faroe Islands	European playoffs	13 April 2025	0 (Debut)
Romania	European playoffs	13 April 2025	26 (1957, 1962, 1965, 1971, 1973, 1975, 1978, 1982, 1986, 1990, 1993, 1995, 1997, 1999, 2001, 2003, 2005, 2007, 2009, 2011, 2013, 2015, 2017, 2019, 2021, 2023)
Serbia	European playoffs	13 April 2025	8 (2001, 2003, 2013, 2015, 2017, 2019, 2021, 2023)
Sweden	European playoffs	13 April 2025	12 (1957, 1990, 1993, 1995, 2001, 2009, 2011, 2015, 2017, 2019, 2021, 2023)
Switzerland	European playoffs	13 April 2025	0 (Debut)
China	Wildcard	31 March 2025	18 (1986, 1990, 1993, 1995, 1997, 1999, 2001, 2003, 2005, 2007, 2019, 2011, 2013, 2015, 2017, 2019, 2021, 2023)
Cuba	Winner Of 2025 Nor.Ca. Handball Championship	12 April 2025	4 (1999, 2011, 2015, 2019)
Paraguay	Winner Of 2025 South and Central American Handball Last Chance Qualifier	26 April 2025	5 (2007, 2013, 2017, 2021, 2023)
Croatia	Wildcard	12 May 2025	9 (1993, 1995, 1997, 2003, 2005, 2007, 2011, 2021, 2023)

== Slot allocation ==
The slot allocation is as follows:

- AHF (Asia): 4 slots
- CAHB (Africa): 4 slots
- EHF (Europe): 17 slots (including the two co-hosts and defending champion)
- NACHC (North America and the Caribbean): 1 slot
- OCHF (Oceania): 0 slots
- SCAHC (South and Central America): 4 slots
- Wildcards: 2 slots

Detailed distribution of places (following current IHF rules)	Vacancies	Details	Comments
Organisers (Note: All hosting federations are automatically entitled to take part in the World Championship. If there is more than one organiser from the same continental confederation, the number of compulsory places of the respective confederation shall be reduced accordingly. If there is more than one organiser and the organisers are not from the same confederation, the IHF Council shall decide about the reduction of the compulsory places, considering only the compulsory places of the confederations involved.)	2		
Reigning world champion (Note: The reigning world champion automatically qualifies for the next World Championship and, as a rule, is placed first in the first performance row. In case the reigning world champion is also hosting the next World Championship, the confederation of the reigning world champion obtains one additional performance place.)	1		
Performance places for the continental confederations	12		Based on teams ranked 1–12 in the preceding world championship
Africa		0	
Asia		0	
Europe		11	
North America and the Caribbean		0	
South and Central America		1	As Brazil ranked 9th in previous World Championship
Oceania		0	
Compulsory places for the continental confederations	15		17 compulsory places reduced by 1 due to having two organisers
Africa		4	
Asia		4	
Europe		3	4 compulsory places reduced by 1 due to having two organisers from Europe
North America and the Caribbean		1	
South and Central America		3	
Oceania		0 or 1 (Note: The continental confederation of Oceania does not have a direct compulsory place for a confederational qualification event, therefore, the Oceanian confederation is invited to participate in the Asian qualification events. The compulsory place is awarded to Oceania if the representative from Oceania is ranked 5th or higher in the Asian qualification. If Oceania fails to rank 5th or does not participate, the IHF Council will award this place as a free wild card.)	Place allocated to Oceania or an additional free wild card
Wild card	1 or 2 (Note: If the teams representing Oceania fail to finish in the top 5 of the Asian Championship or does not participate, the IHF Council will change Oceania's spot into a second wild card.)		
Total	32		

== Summary ==
=== Summary of qualification process ===
The World Championship hosts will be directly qualified, along with the reigning world champions. In regards to the 12 performance spots, and based on the results of the 2025 Women's World Championship, Europe receives 11 more spots, while South and Central America takes 1.

Map of each IHF federation.
Detailed summary of qualification process
Confederation	Direct slots	Teams started	Teams eliminated	Teams qualified	Percentage of entered teams with spots in finals	Qualifying start date	Qualifying end date
AHF	4	8	4	4+1	50%	3 December 2024	10 December 2024
CAHB	4	12	8	4	33%	27 November 2024	7 December 2024
EHF (Note: There are ways of qualifying from Europe, via the European Championship or European qualification)	15+2	34+2	19	15+2+1	44.11%	24 October 2024	13 April 2025
NACHC	1	5	4	1	20%	7 April 2025	12 April 2025
OCHF (Note: The Asian Championship acts as qualification for the Oceanian teams.)	0 or 1	0 (Note: Oceanian teams who enter, participate in the Asian Championship to decides their qualification. However, Australia withdrew before the tournament, meaning no Oceanian team qualified.)	0	0	0%		
SCAHC	4	8	4	4	50%	26 November 2024	26 April 2025
Total	28+2+2	14+2	24	28+2+2		24 October 2024	13 April 2025

=== Summary of qualified teams ===
Competition	Dates	Host	Vacancies	Qualified
Host nations	28 February 2020	(Egypt) Cairo	2	Germany; Netherlands
2023 World Championship	17 December 2023	Denmark; Norway; Sweden	1	France
2024 South and Central American Championship	26–30 November 2024	(Brazil) Niterói	3+1	Argentina; Brazil; Uruguay
2024 African Championship	27 November – 7 December 2024	(Democratic Republic of the Congo) Kinshasa	4	Angola; Egypt; Senegal; Tunisia
2024 Asian Championship	3–10 December 2024	(India) New Delhi	4	Iran; Japan; Kazakhstan; South Korea
2024 European Championship	28 November – 15 December 2024	Austria; Hungary; Switzerland	3	Denmark; Hungary; Norway
2025 Nor.Ca. Women's Championship	7–12 April 2025	Mexico City	1	Cuba
European qualification	24 October 2024 – 13 April 2025	Various	11	Austria; Czech Republic; Spain; Faroe Islands; Iceland; Montenegro; Poland; Romania; Serbia; Sweden; Switzerland
2025 South and Central American Last Chance Qualifier	3–10 December 2024	(Colombia) Palmira	1	Paraguay
Wild card	31 March 2025	(Qatar) Doha	1^{[1]}^{[2]}	China

1. To bear in mind the 2028 Summer Olympics, the IHF Council awarded the United States wild cards for the 2025 and 2027 World Championships. If they reach a certain performance level.

2. If countries from Oceania (Australia or New Zealand) participating in the Asian Championships finish within the top 5, they will qualify for the World Championships. If either finishes sixth or lower, the place would have been transferred to the wild card spot. As New Zealand didn't registered and Australia withdrew before the draw, the place is transferred.

== 2023 World Championship ==
World champion directly qualified for 2025 edition. France won the 2023 World Championship to secure their ticket to the 2025 edition.

Rank	Team
1st place, gold medalist(s)	France
2nd place, silver medalist(s)	Norway
3rd place, bronze medalist(s)	Denmark
4	Sweden
5	Netherlands
6	Germany
7	Montenegro
8	Czech Republic
9	Brazil
10	Hungary
11	Slovenia
12	Romania
13	Spain
14	Croatia
15	Angola
16	Poland
17	Japan
18	Senegal
19	Austria
20	Argentina
21	Serbia
22	South Korea
23	Ukraine
24	Cameroon
25	Iceland
26	Congo
27	Chile
28	China
29	Paraguay
30	Kazakhstan
31	Iran
32	Greenland

== Asia ==
Eight teams competed in the Asian Championship, held at the Indira Gandhi Arena in New Delhi, India, from 3 to 10 December 2024. The top 4 reached the world championship. Since Australia withdrew before the competition started, Oceania's spot was made into a second wildcard. Iran, Japan, Kazakhstan and South Korea reached the world championship.

Group A

Pos	Team	Pld	Pts
1	South Korea	3	6
2	Kazakhstan	3	4
3	China	3	2
4	Singapore	3	0

Source: Asianhandball
Group B

Pos	Team	Pld	Pts
1	Japan	3	6
2	Iran	3	4
3	India (H)	3	2
4	Hong Kong	3	0

Source: Asianhandball
(H) Hosts

=== Bracket ===
Semi-finals
8 December
South Korea	33
Iran	20
8 December
Japan	30
Kazakhstan	23

Final
10 December
South Korea	24
Japan	25
Third place
10 December
Iran	22
Kazakhstan	28

=== Final standing ===
Rank	Team
1st place, gold medalist(s)	Japan
2nd place, silver medalist(s)	South Korea
3rd place, bronze medalist(s)	Kazakhstan
4	Iran
5	China
6	India
7	Hong Kong
8	Singapore

Qualified for the 2025 World Women's Handball Championship

== Africa ==
Twelve teams competed in the African Championship, held at the Stade des Martyrs Gymnasium in Kinshasa, DR Congo, from 27 November to 7 December 2024. The top four from the championship qualified. Those teams ended up being Angola, Egypt, Senegal, Tunisia.

Group A

Pos	Team	Pld	Pts
1	Congo	5	8
2	Egypt	5	8
3	Senegal	5	8
4	Algeria	5	4
5	Cape Verde	5	2
6	Kenya	5	0

Source: CAN
Group B

Pos	Team	Pld	Pts
1	Angola	5	10
2	Cameroon	5	8
3	DR Congo (H)	5	6
4	Tunisia	5	3
5	Guinea	5	3
6	Uganda	5	0

Source: CAN
(H) Hosts

=== Bracket ===
Quarter-finals
4 December
Congo	24
Tunisia	28
4 December
Cameroon	19
Senegal	26
4 December
Egypt	23
DR Congo	22
4 December
Angola	34
Algeria	15

Semi-finals
6 December
Tunisia	18
Senegal	26
6 December
Egypt	22
Angola	36

Final
7 December
Senegal	18
Angola	27
Third place
7 December
Tunisia	25
Egypt	22

=== Final standing ===
Rank	Team
1st place, gold medalist(s)	Angola
2nd place, silver medalist(s)	Senegal
3rd place, bronze medalist(s)	Tunisia
4	Egypt
5	DR Congo
6	Congo
7	Cameroon
8	Algeria
9	Guinea
10	Cape Verde
11	Uganda
12	Kenya

Team qualified for the 2025 World Women's Handball Championship

== Europe ==
The three highest ranked non-qualified teams secure a ticket to the world championship.

Rank	Team
1st place, gold medalist(s)	Norway
2nd place, silver medalist(s)	Denmark
3rd place, bronze medalist(s)	Hungary
4	France
5	Sweden
6	Netherlands
7	Germany
8	Montenegro
9	Poland
10	Slovenia
11	Romania
12	Switzerland
13	Spain
14	Austria
15	Czech Republic
16	Iceland
17	Faroe Islands
18	North Macedonia
19	Croatia
20	Türkiye
21	Serbia
22	Portugal
23	Ukraine
24	Slovakia

Team qualified for the 2025 World Women's Handball Championship

=== European qualification ===
From October 2024 to April 2025, the EHF organised a separate qualification for 11 places.

=== Bracket ===
The draw took place on 15 December 2024 in Vienna.

Team 1	Agg.	Team 2	1st leg	2nd leg
Switzerland	68–46	Slovakia	38–22	30–24
Italy	38–61	Romania	21–30	17–31
Poland	45–39	North Macedonia	22–18	23–21
Sweden	94–40	Kosovo	51–16	43–24
Slovenia	60–62	Serbia	29–29	31–33
Portugal	45–61	Montenegro	19–31	26–30
Faroe Islands	65–56	Lithuania	36–26	29–30
Czech Republic	61–46	Ukraine	35–19	26–27
Croatia	44–49	Spain	27–26	17–23
Austria	66–54	Turkey	36–29	30–25
Iceland	70–48	Israel	39–27	31–21

== North America and Caribbean ==
The championship was held from 7 to 12 April 2025 in Mexico City, Mexico. The top winner of the championship qualified. Cuba would finish and advance to the world championship.

Rank	Team
1st place, gold medalist(s)	Cuba
2nd place, silver medalist(s)	Mexico
3rd place, bronze medalist(s)	Canada
4	United States
5	Puerto Rico

== South and Central America ==
Six teams competed in the South and Central American Championship, held at the Colégio Niterói in Niterói, Brazil, from 26 to 30 November 2024. The top three from the championship qualified. Brazil, Argentina and Uruguay would finish in top three and advance to the world championship.

Pos	Team	Pld	Pts
1	Brazil (H)	5	10
2	Argentina	5	8
3	Uruguay	5	6
4	Paraguay	5	4
5	Chile	5	2
6	El Salvador	5	0

Source: Torneoscoscabal
(H) Hosts

=== Last chance tournament ===
To decide the last qualifier, a last chance tournament was organised in Palmira, Colombia between the 24 to 26 April 2025.

Pos	Team	Pld	Pts
1	Paraguay	2	4
2	Colombia (H)	2	2
3	Peru	2	0

(H) Hosts

== Wildcards ==
After no Oceanian team achieved a top 5 finish in the Asian Championship, two wildcards were given out by the IHF. On 31 March 2025, China was given the first wildcard due to good performances and country's position, making it a big market for the sport.

- China

The United States were provisionally given a wildcard, so the team could use this opportunity to prepare for the 2028 Summer Olympics which they will be hosting. However, their lack of progress led the IHF to choose a different wildcard. Later on, four countries applied.

- Croatia
- Lithuania
- North Macedonia
- Slovenia

After their play off loss to Serbia, Slovenia's coach, Dragan Adžić, stated that his team deserved the last wildcard. On 12 May 2025, Croatia was given the second wildcard, with Slovenia as the first standby.
