= Mikhail Lutsenko =

Soviet handball player

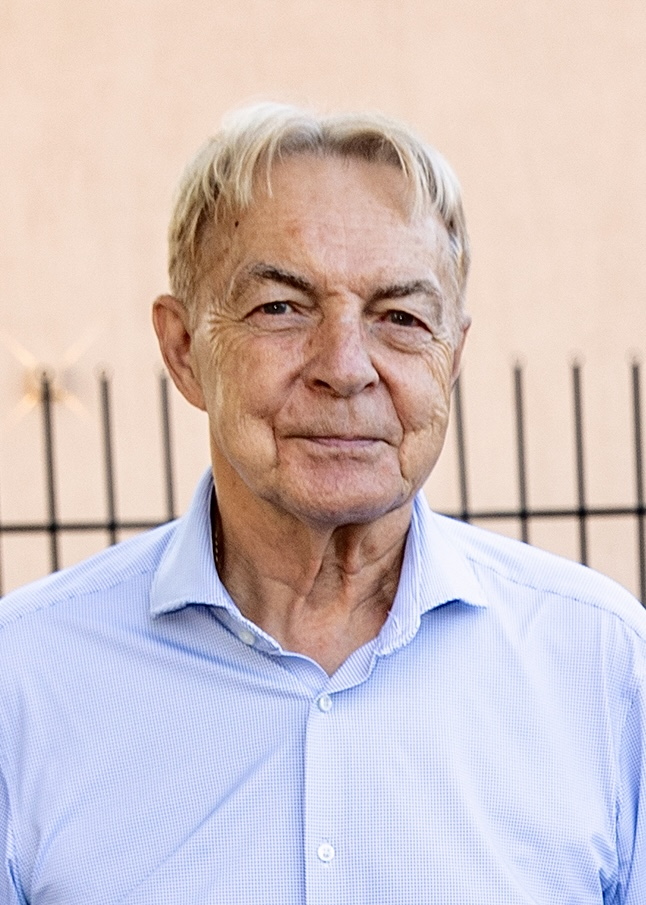

Personal information
- Nationality: Russian
- Born: 11 May 1948 (age 77); Moscow, Russian SFSR, Soviet Union

Sport
- Sport: Handball

Mikhail Andreyevich Lutsenko (Russian: Михаил Андреевич Луценко; born 11 May 1948, Moscow) is a Soviet handball player and coach. He competed in the men's tournament at the 1972 Summer Olympics. From 1979 to 1988, he served as an assistant coach for the women's national handball team of the USSR under Ihor Turchyn.

He is a Master of Sports of the USSR of international class. Honored Coach of the RSFSR (1980), Honored Coach of the USSR (1982). Honored Worker of Physical Culture of the Russian Federation (2005).

== Career ==
He was born in Moscow in the Kuntsevo district. Mikhail Lutsenko began playing handball in the 10th grade after a radio engineering plant took patronage over his school. His first coach in the "Trud" team was Boris Akbashev.

Later, "Trud" was renamed "Kuntsevo." He served in the Soviet Army at the Dzerzhinsky Academy, representing the local handball team while continuing to train with "Kuntsevo". Along with "Kuntsevo," he became the champion of the USSR in 1967 and 1969. As a player, he later represented another capital club — HBC CSKA Moscow. He played as a playmaker.

He made his debut for the USSR national team in 1970. He participated in the 1972 Olympic Games in Munich (5th place). He played 32 matches for the national team and scored 24 goals.

From 1979 to 1988, he was part of the coaching staff of the women's national handball team of the USSR, serving as an assistant to head coach Ihor Turchyn. Under their leadership, Soviet handball players won the gold medal at the 1980 Olympics and became world champions in 1982 and 1986. In 1984, the Soviet Union won the "Friendship-84" tournament held in Trencin, Czechoslovakia. Afterward, he worked as a team manager and assisted Spartak Mironovich and Vladimir Maximov in preparing the CIS national team before their victorious performance at the 1992 competitions in Barcelona.

Since 1992, he has been the manager of the Russian national team. During this time, the Russian team achieved victories at the 2000 Olympics, won bronze at the 2004 Olympics, and triumphed at the World Championships (1993 and 1997), European Championships (1996), and secured silver at the World Cup (1996 and 1999).

After the resignation of Vladimir Maximov, Lutsenko was appointed as the acting head coach of the Russian men's national team in February 2012. He held this position until March 15, 2012, after which Oleg Kuleshov took over as head coach.

He participated in the V International Handball Tournament for Veterans in 2004. He is also a referee inspector for the Handball Federation of Russia.

== Achievements ==
=== As a Player ===
- USSR Champion: 1967, 1969
- USSR Championship Silver Medalist: 1968, 1970, 1972
- USSR Championship Bronze Medalist: 1976, 1978
- World Champion among Students: 1971
- Champion of the V Spartakiad of the Peoples of the USSR: 1971
- Champion of the Spartakiad of the Armed Forces of the USSR: 1970
- Olympic Games Participant: 1972
- Winner and medalist of international competitions: France (1970); GDR, Spain, Poland, Romania, FRG (1971); Austria, FRG, Yugoslavia (1972); Denmark, Congo, Sweden (1973, 1974); GDR, Romania, FRG (1976, 1977)

=== As a Coach ===
- Olympic Champion: 1980
- Olympic Games Bronze Medalist: 1988
- World Champion: 1982, 1986
- Winner of the "Friendship-84" tournament

== Awards and Titles ==
- Medal "For Distinguished Labour" (1980)
- Medal "For Labour Valour" (1985)
- Badge "Excellence in Physical Culture and Sports"
- Master of Sports of the USSR of International Class
- Honored Coach of the RSFSR (1980)
- Honored Coach of the USSR (1982)
- Honored Worker of Physical Culture of the Russian Federation (2005)
- Honorary Badge "For Merits in the Development of the Olympic Movement in Russia" (1999, 2000, 2004)
- Commemorative Medal "30 Years of Victory at the Olympic Games in Montreal-76" (2006)
- Commemorative Medal dedicated to the 30th anniversary of the XXII Olympic Games in Moscow in 1980 "For Additional Contribution to the Development of Sports and International Sports Cooperation" (2010)
- Commemorative Medal dedicated to the centenary of the establishment of the state governing body in the field of physical culture and sports (2023)
- Entry in the Honor Roll for high sports mastery, revolution towards victory, and cultural qualities with a high moral and volitional quality (1982)
