= Zinaida Turchyna =

Ukrainian handball player

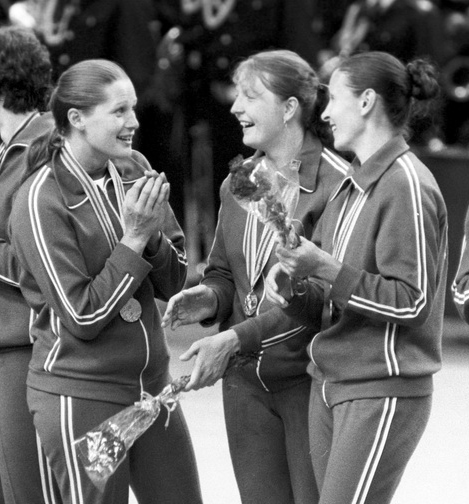
- Turchyna (right) at the 1980 Olympics

Personal information
- Born: 17 May 1946 (age 80) Kyiv, Ukrainian SSR, Soviet Union
- Height: 180 cm (5 ft 11 in)
- Weight: 73 kg (161 lb)

Sport
- Sport: Handball
- Club: HC Spartak Kyiv
- Coached by: Igor Turchin
Medal record
Representing the Soviet Union
Olympic Games
Gold medal – first place	1976 Montreal	Team
Gold medal – first place	1980 Moscow	Team
Bronze medal – third place	1988 Seoul	Team
World Championship
Gold medal – first place	1982 Hungary	Team
Gold medal – first place	1986 Netherlands	Team
Silver medal – second place	1975 Soviet Union	Team
Silver medal – second place	1978 Czechoslovakia	Team
Bronze medal – third place	1973 Yugoslavia	Team

Zinaida Mykhaylivna Turchyna (Ukrainian: Зінаїда Михайлiвна Турчина, née Stolitenko on 17 May 1946) is a retired Ukrainian handball player. Coached by her husband Ihor Turchyn she competed for the Soviet Union in all major international tournaments in 1973–1988, except for the boycotted 1984 Summer Olympics, and won three Olympic and five world championship medals. In 2000, a panel from the International Handball Federation and sports journalists named her the best female handball player of the 20th century.

== Biography ==
She graduated from the Kamyanets-Podilskyi Pedagogical Institute (1972).

Married to coach Igor Turchyn, she gave birth to a daughter Natalia in 1971 and a son Mykhailo in 1983. Natalia Turchyna — master of sports of international class, also achieved considerable success in handball.

== Sports career ==
Stolitenko was brought to handball in 1959 by Ihor Turchyn, a team-sports coach 10 years her senior, who later headed HC Spartak Kyiv from 1962 to 1993 and the Soviet handball team from 1973 to 1993. She married him in 1965 and changed her last name from Stolitenko to Turchyna. They had a daughter Natalia (born 1971) and a son, Mikhailo. (born 1983). Natalia played handball alongside her mother for Spartak Kyiv, while Mikhailo went into basketball. After the death of her husband in 1993, Turchyna took over his coaching positions at Spartak Kyiv and the Ukrainian national team. She retired from coaching in 1996, but still works as the manager of Spartak Kyiv. Since 2002 she has lived with her boyfriend Vladimir.

Zinaida Turchyna played for the team "Spartak" (Kyiv). She won the USSR Championship 20 times and won the European Champions Cup 13 times.

Her successes with the national team, for which she played continually from 1965 to 1988. At the 1976 Olympic tournament, she played five matches and scored 22 goals. At the Moscow Olympics, she scored seven goals in five matches. At the Olympics in Seoul, she threw one ball in five games. In addition to her Olympic successes, Turchyna became the world champion in 1982 and 1986. In total, she played more than 500 international matches for the USSR national team from 1965 to 1988, were even more impressive.

In 2000, according to the results of a survey conducted by the expert jury of the International Handball Federation, Zinaida Turchyna was recognized as the best female handball player of the 20th century.

== Coaching career ==
1990–1994 —player-coach, 1994–1996 —head coach of Spartak team and national team of Ukraine.

Turchyna is the president of the handball club "Kyiv-Spartak" since 1993.

== Titles and achievements ==
=== With USSR national team ===
- Olympics Games
  - Gold (2): 1976, 1980
  - Bronze (2): 1988
- World Championship
  - Gold (2): 1982, 1986
  - Silver (2): 1975, 1978
  - Bronze (1): 1973
- Others
  - Winner of 1984 Friendship Games

=== With Spartak Kyiv ===
European cups

- European Champions Cup:
  - Winner (13): 1969–70, 1970–71, 1971–72, 1972–73, 1974–75, 1976–77, 1978–79, 1980–81, 1982–83, 1984–85, 1985–86, 1986–87, 1987–88
  - Finalist (2): 1973–74, 1988–89
- Cup Winners Cup
  - Finalist (1): 1990–91

Domestic competitions

- USSR Championship
  - Winner (20): 1969, 1970, 1971, 1972, 1973, 1974, 1975, 1976, 1977, 1978, 1979, 1980, 1981, 1982, 1983, 1984, 1985, 1986, 1987, 1988
  - Runners-up (2): 1990, 1991
  - Third (1): 1989
- Ukrainian Championship
  - Winner (1): 1992
