= 2031 World Women's Handball Championship =

Mistrovství světa v házené žen 2031 Mistrzostwa Świata w Piłce Ręcznej Kobiet 2031

Tournament details
- Host countries: Czech Republic; Poland
- Teams: 32 (from 5 confederations)

The 2031 IHF World Women's Handball Championship, will be the 30th event hosted by the International Handball Federation. It will take place in December 2031 in Czech Republic and Poland.

== Bidding process ==
In April 2023, the IHF stated that they were looking for bids. In the end, two bids expressed interest in hosting the tournament.

- China and Russia
- Czech Republic and Poland

The bids were confirmed on 1 March 2024:

- Czech Republic and Poland

Czech Republic and Poland won the hosting right on 16 April 2024 in Créteil, France.

== Venues ==
The proposed venues are:

- (Poland) Katowice – Spodek, capacity 11,016
- (Poland) Katowice – GWS Katowice Sports Hall, capacity 3,001
- (Poland) Sosnowiec – Arena Sosnowiec, capacity 3,052
- (Czech Republic) Brno – Arena Brno, capacity 13,300

The proposed venues are in Brno, Katowice and Sosnowiec. The final will be in the Spodek in Katowice.

== Qualification ==
Competition	Dates	Host	Vacancies	Qualified
Host nations	16 April 2024	(France) Créteil	2	Czech Republic; Poland
2029 World Championship	December 2029	Spain	1	
2030 European Women's Handball Championship	28 November–15 December 2030		3 + ?	
European qualification			3 + ?	
2030 Asian Championship			4 + ?	
2030 South and Central American Championship			3 + ?	
2030 African Championship			4 + ?	
2031 Nor.Ca. Women's Championship			1 + ?	
Wild card	TBD	TBD	1 or 2^{[1]}	

1. If countries from Oceania (Australia or New Zealand) participating in the Asian Championships finish within the top 5, they will qualify for the World Championships. If either finishes sixth or lower, the place would have been transferred to the wild card spot.

== Qualified teams ==
Team	Qualification method	Date of qualification	Appearance(s)				Previous best performance (Note: Bold text indicates they hosted that edition.)
Team	Qualification method	Date of qualification	Total	First	Last	Streak	Previous best performance
Czech Republic (Note: Previously participated as Czechoslovakia.)	Co-host	16 April 2024	20th	1957	2025	1	**Champions** (**1957**)
Poland	Co-host	16 April 2024	20th	1957	2025	1	Fourth place (2013, 2015)
