= Larysa Karlova =

Ukrainian handball player (born 1958)

Olympic medal record

Women's Handball
Gold medal – first place	1976 Montreal	Team
Gold medal – first place	1980 Moscow	Team
Bronze medal – third place	1988 Seoul	Team

World Championship
Silver medal – second place	1978 Czechoslovakia	Team
Gold medal – first place	1982 Hungary	Team
Gold medal – first place	1986 Netherlands	Team

Larysa Aleksandrivna Karlova (Ukrainian: Лариса Александрівна Карлова, born 7 August 1958 in Kiev) is a former Soviet handball player who competed in the 1976 Summer Olympics, in the 1980 Summer Olympics, and in the 1988 Summer Olympics. One of the most outstanding players in the history of handball.

In 1976, she won the gold medal with the Soviet team. She played all five matches and scored one goal.

Four years later, she was a member of the Soviet team which won the gold medal again. She played all five matches and scored 19 goals.

In 1988, she won the bronze medal as part of the Soviet team. She played all five matches and scored seven goals.
