= Lyudmyla Poradnyk =

Soviet handball player

Medal record

Women's handball

Representing Soviet Union

Olympic Games
Gold medal – first place	1976 Montreal	Team
Gold medal – first place	1980 Moscow	Team

World Championship
Silver medal – second place	1975 Soviet Union	Team
Silver medal – second place	1978 Czechoslovakia	Team
Bronze medal – third place	1973 Yugoslavia	Team

Lyudmyla Kostiantynivna Poradnyk-Bobrus (née Bobrus, Ukrainian: Людмила Костянтинівна Порадник-Бобрусь, born January 11, 1946, in Kyiv, Ukrainian SSR) is a former Soviet/Ukrainian handball player who competed in the 1976 Summer Olympics and in the 1980 Summer Olympics.

In 1976 she won the gold medal with the Soviet team. She played all five matches and scored six goals.

Four years later she was a member of the Soviet team which won the gold medal again. She played all five matches and scored two goals.
