= Biserka Višnjić =

Croatian handball player (born 1953)

Olympic medal record

Handball
Gold medal – first place	1984 Los Angeles	Team
Silver medal – second place	1980 Moscow	Team

World championship
Gold medal – first place	1973 Yugoslavia	Team
Bronze medal – third place	1982 Hungary	Team

Biserka Višnjić, née Rožić (born 10 October 1953 in Trogir) is a Croatian handball player who competed for the Yugoslavian national team and for yugoslav club ŽRK Trešnjevka Zagreb.

In the 1980 Summer Olympics, she won the silver medal with the Yugoslav team. She played all five matches and scored 33 goals and hence became the top scorer of the tournament. Four years later in 1984 Los Angeles, she won the gold medal as member of the Yugoslav team. She played four matches including the final and scored fifteen goals.

She also won a gold medal in the 1973 World championship and a bronze medal in 1982 World championship.
