= National team appearances in the World Women's Field Handball Championship =

This article lists the performances of each of the 10 national teams which have made at least one appearance in the IHF World Women's Field Handball Championship finals.

== Debut of teams ==
Each successive World Women's Handball Championship has had at least one team appearing for the first time. Teams in parentheses are considered successor teams by IHF.

Year	Debutants	Total
1949	Austria; France; Hungary; Czechoslovakia	4
1956	West Germany; Romania; Yugoslavia	3
1960	Denmark; Netherlands; Poland	3

== Participation details ==
Legend

- 1st – Champions
- 2nd – Runners-up
- 3rd – Third place
- 4th – Fourth place
- 5th – Fifth place
- 6th – Sixth place
- • — Did not qualify
- × — Did not enter
- — Hosts

For each tournament, the number of teams in each finals tournament (in brackets) are shown.

Team	(Hungary); 1949 (4)	(West Germany); 1956 (6)	(Romania); 1960 (6)	Total
Austria	2nd	4th	2nd	3
Denmark	×	×	5th	1
France	4th	6th	×	2
Germany (including West Germany)	×	2nd	3rd	2
Hungary	1st	3rd	×	2
Netherlands	×	•	4th	1
Poland	×	•	6th	1
Romania	×	1st	1st	2
Discontinued teams
Czechoslovakia	3rd	×	×	1
Yugoslavia	×	5th	×	1

== Results of host nations ==
Year	Host nation	Finish
1949	Hungary	Champions
1956	West Germany	Runners-up
1960	Romania	Champions

== Results of defending champions ==
Year	Defending champions	Finish
1949	—	—
1956	Hungary	Third Place
1960	Romania	Champions
