= Ihor Turchyn =

Ukrainian handball coach

Personal information
- Born: 16 November 1936 Sofiental, Cetatea Albă, Kingdom of Romania (now Sofiivka, Ukraine)
- Died: 7 November 1993 (aged 56) Bucharest, Romania
Medal record
Coach for women's handball
Soviet Union
Olympic Games
Gold medal – first place	1976 Montreal	Team
Gold medal – first place	1980 Moscow	Team
Bronze medal – third place	1988 Seoul	Team
World Championship
Bronze medal – third place	1973 Yugoslavia	Team
Silver medal – second place	1975 Soviet Union	Team
Silver medal – second place	1978 Czechoslovakia	Team
Gold medal – first place	1982 Hungary	Team
Gold medal – first place	1986 Netherlands	Team

Ihor Yevdokymovych Turchyn (Ukrainian: Ігор Євдокимович Турчин; 16 November 1936 – 7 November 1993) was a Ukrainian handball coach, who headed the Soviet and then Ukrainian national team from 1973 to 1993, bringing them to three Olympic and five world championship medals.

== Biography ==
In 1959, Turchyn assembled a handball team of teenage girls, which in 1962 became HC Spartak Kyiv. The club became 20-time Soviet champion (1969–1988) and 13-time winner of the EHF Champions League (1970–1973, 1975, 1977, 1979, 1981, 1983, 1985–1988).

Under Turchyn's leadership, Spartak Kyiv became the first champion of independent Ukraine. At the time of his death, he was recognized as the most titled coach in the history of handball, ad his name was included into the Guinness World Book of Records.

== Personal life and death ==
In 1965, he married Zinaida Stolitenko, a trainee 10 years his junior. They had a daughter, Natalia (born 1971), and a son, Mikhail (born 1983). Natalia played handball alongside her mother for Spartak Kyiv, while Mikhail went into basketball.

In his last years, Turchyn suffered several heart attacks. He underwent a complex bypass surgery in Norway, and after that coached the Norwegian women's handball team for eight months. He died of a heart attack during an EHF Cup match in Romania in 1993. After his death, his wife took over his coaching positions with Spartak Kyiv and the Ukrainian national team.

== Legacy ==
In October 2026 General Assembly of the National Olympic Committee of Ukraine voted to award Turchyn's name to the Kyiv Palace of Sports.

== Awards ==
- Order of the Red Banner of Labour (1976, 1980)
- Order of the Badge of Honour (1971)
- Order of Friendship of Peoples (1985)
