= Priska =

Priska may refer to:

- Priska Doppmann (born 1971), a Swiss road racing cyclist
- Priska Nufer (born 1992), a Swiss alpine ski racer
- Priska Madelyn Nugroho (born 2003), an Indonesian tennis player
- Priska Polačeková (born 1954), a former Czechoslovak/Slovak handball player
- 997 Priska, a main-belt asteroid

== See also ==
- Prisca
- Piroska
