= Tetyana Kocherhina =

Soviet handball player (born 1956)

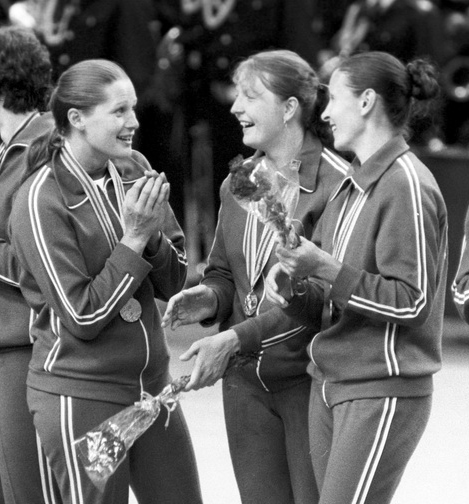
- Kocherhina (left) at the 1980 Olympics

Personal information
- Born: 26 March 1956 (age 70) Ovidiopol, Ukraine
- Height: 175 cm (5 ft 9 in)
- Weight: 75 kg (165 lb)

Sport
- Sport: Handball
- Club: Spartak Kyiv
- Coached by: Igor Turchin
Medal record
Representing the Soviet Union
Olympic Games
Gold medal – first place	1976 Montreal	Team
Gold medal – first place	1980 Moscow	Team
World Championships
Bronze medal – third place	1973 Yugoslavia	Team
Silver medal – second place	1975 Soviet Union	Team
Silver medal – second place	1978 Czechoslovakia	Team

Tetyana Ivanivna Kocherhina (née Makarets, Ukrainian: Тетяна Іванівна Кочергіна-Макарець, born 26 March 1956) is a retired Ukrainian handball player. Competing for the Soviet Union she won gold medals at the 1976 and 1980 Olympics and three medals at the world championships in 1973–1978. During her career Kocherhina played 133 international matches and scored 616 goals, more than anyone in the Soviet team. She was the best scorer of the 1975 World Championships.

Makarets was the youngest child in a family of nine siblings. She took up handball around 1968, and in 1972 was included to the Soviet national team. In 1976 she married a fellow handball player Sergey Kochergin and changed her last name from Makarets to Kocherhina/Kochergina. In 1981 she retired from the national team due to injuries and gave birth to a daughter, but then played for a few years with the local club in Brovary. In April 1988 she started lecturing at the Faculty of Sports of the Taras Shevchenko National University of Kyiv and later became its dean.
