= Igor Turchin =

Igor Turchin may refer to:

- Igor Turchin (fencer) (born 1982), Russian fencer
- Igor Turchin (handball) (1936–1993), Soviet and Ukrainian handball coach
