= Piroska =

- Gender: feminine
- Language: Hungarian

Origin
- Language: Latin
- Derivation: Piri
- Meaning: "ancient"

Other names
- Nickname: Piri
- Anglicisation: Priscilla
- Derived: Prisca
- Related names: Piros

Piroska is a Hungarian feminine given name. Derived from the Latin name Prisca ("ancient"), the Hungarian form of the name originally appeared as Piriska, later developing into Piroska. This change was likely due to Piriska's similarity to the Hungarian name — and color — Piros ('red').

The name is on the official list of Hungarian names managed by the Research Institute for Linguistics of the Hungarian Academy of Sciences. Its diminutive form, or nickname, Piri, has developed into a standalone name.

The name day for Piroska and Piri is January 18.

== Notable Piroskas and Piris ==
=== Given name ===
- Piroska Abos, Spanish cross-country skier
- Piroska Budai, Hungarian handball player
- Piroska Csontos, Hungarian Paralympic athlete
- Piroska Jancsó-Ladányi, Hungarian serial killer
- Gabriella Piroska Mészáros, Hungarian pornographic actress
- Piroska Molnár, Hungarian actress
- Piroska Oszoli, Hungarian painter
- Piroska Reichard, Hungarian-Jewish poet, critic, and translator
- Piroska Szamoránsky, Hungarian handball player
- Piroska Szekrényessy, Hungarian pair skater
- Saint Piroska, renamed Irene, daughter of King László I, wife of John II Komnenos
- Piri Vaszary, Hungarian actress

=== Surname ===
- Attila Piroska, Romanian football midfielder
- József Piroska, Hungarian alpine skier
- Juraj Piroska, Slovak football midfielder

== The name Piroska in popular culture ==
- Piroska Rozgonyi in János Arany's narrative poem Toldi szerelme
- Hungarian name for Little Red Riding Hood

== See also ==
- Priscilla, whose Hungarian form is Priszcilla
