= Lyubov Odynokova =

Soviet handball player (born 1955)

Olympic medal record

Women's Handball
Gold medal – first place	1976 Montreal	Team
Gold medal – first place	1980 Moscow	Team

World Championships
Gold medal – first place	1982 Hungary	Team
Silver medal – second place	1978 Czechoslovakia	Team

Lyubov Ivanivna Odynokova-Berezhnaya (née Berezhnaya, Ukrainian: Любов Іванівна Одинокова-Бережная, born July 24, 1955) is a former Soviet/Ukrainian handball player who competed in the 1976 Summer Olympics and in the 1980 Summer Olympics.

In 1976 she won the gold medal with the Soviet team. She played all five matches and scored nine goals.

Four years later she was a member of the Soviet team which won the gold medal again. She played all five matches and scored 16 goals.
