= Petra Komínková =

Czech handball player (born 1951)

Personal information
- Nationality: Czech
- Born: Ostrava, Czechoslovakia

Sport
- Sport: Handball
National team
- Years: Team
- –: Czechoslovakia

Petra Komínková (born 15 November 1951 is a Czech handball player, born in Ostrava.

She played for the Czechoslovak national team, and represented Czechoslovakia at the 1980 Summer Olympics in Moscow.
