= Alena Horalová =

Czech handball player

Personal information
- Nationality: Czech
- Born: 24 November 1952 (age 73) Plzeň, Czechoslovakia

Sport
- Sport: Handball
National team
- Years: Team
- –: Czechoslovakia

Alena Horalová (born 24 November 1952) is a Czech handball player, born in Plzeň.

She played for the Czechoslovak national team, and represented Czechoslovakia at the 1980 Summer Olympics in Moscow.
