= Milena Foltýnová-Gschiessl =

Czech handball player (1950-1993

Personal information
- Nationality: Czech/Austrian
- Born: 14 May 1950 Litvínov, Czechoslovakia
- Died: 24 December 1993 (aged 43) Vienna, Austria

Sport
- Sport: Handball
National team
- Years: Team
- –: Czechoslovakia
- –: Austria

Milena Foltýnová-Gschiessl (24 June 1950 – 24 December 1993) was originally a Czech and later an Austrian handball player, who played for both the Czechoslovak and Austrian national teams. She played for the Czechoslovakia women's national handball team, and represented Czechoslovakia at the 1980 Summer Olympics in Moscow. She played for the Austria women's national handball team at the 1984 Summer Olympics in Los Angeles. She died in Vienna in 1993.
