= Sabine Röther =

East German handball player (born 1957)

Olympic medal record

Women's handball
| Bronze medal – third place | 1980 Moscow | Team |

IHF World Championship
| Gold medal – first place | 1978 Czechoslovakia | |

Sabine Röther (later Kirschke, born 17 June 1957) is a former East German handball player who is a world champion from the 1978 World Championship. She also competed in the 1980 Summer Olympics, where she won a bronze medal.

In 1980 she won the bronze medal with the East German team. She played all five matches and scored nineteen goals. She ended up playing 132 matches for the East German team, scoring 441 goals.

She played her club handball at SC Empor Rostock.

In total she played 132 games for the East German national team, scoring 441 goals. She was in 1979 awarded the DDR Patriotic Order of Merit in bronze.
