= Czech handball =

Czech variant of handball

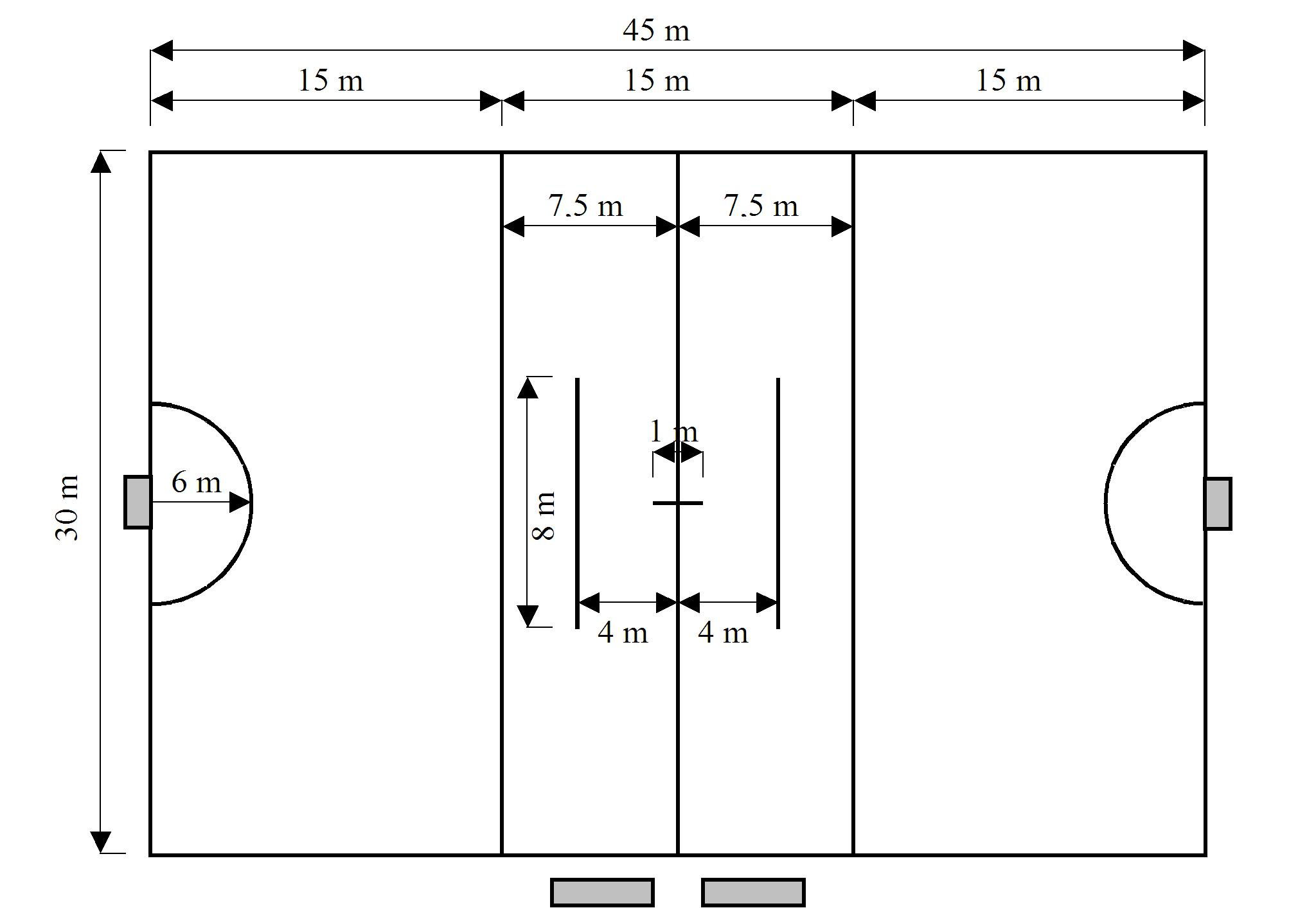
Czech handball – the field

Czech handball (Czech: česká házená, also known as národní házená, lit. 'national handball') is an outdoor ball game which was created in 1905 in Prague. The sport is very similar to team handball.

== History ==
Czech handball is first mentioned by Václav Karas, a teacher a Prague, in a sports journal in Brno in 1905. The rules were soon further developed by other teachers, notably Klenka and Kristof. Thanks to Kristof, the first Czech handball association was established (in Prague) and the rules were made public in 1908.

Students from Russia and Yugoslavia, who had become acquainted with Czech handball in Prague, brought this sport back to their own countries. In Yugoslavia, the sport expanded fast and became very popular, particularly among women, who were the first to introduce the game into the country. Czech teachers taught Czech handball in Russian middle schools and there was a competition with 14 teams in Kharkov in 1915, but efforts to expand the sport ended after the October Revolution.

In 1921, the Czechoslovak Association of Handball and Women's Sports became a member of the International Women's Sports Federation. In this federation, the rules of Czech handball were made official (in those times, there was also one similar sport, Field handball in Germany. Some international federations preferred Czech handball, others preferred Field handball). The first international matches were played.

The first women's Czech handball world cup was organised in 1930. Czechoslovaks won this competition, Yugoslavia came in second, and Poland was third.

The second World Cup was held in London in 1934, but only two teams participated: Yugoslavia and Czechoslovakia. Yugoslavians won the match 6-4 and became the champions. This was the first time that Czech handball was played in England. After this event, the IWSF was abolished.

In 1935, there was a training camp for English teachers in Scarborough. 50 female and 20 male players practised the “game of hazena”, the first ever English players. Further training was planned in London. The netball and other ball sports' association organised the printing and publishing of the rules of Czech handball. The Civil Service Club in London was the first Czech handball club in Britain.

Czech handball became very popular during the German occupation of Czechoslovakia in World War II. The sport was originally Czech, so most people understood its play as a show of patriotism. In early 1940s, there were 25,884 players in the Protectorate of Bohemia and Moravia.

In 1947, the International Handball Federation promoted the expansion of the related sport of team handball, but no further foreign countries would adopt Czech handball.

In 1954, there were 26,125 registered players in 447 clubs, the largest number of registered player to date.

Since 1941, a men's and women's 1st league have been competing. There is also the men's 2nd league and regional championships.

== Rules ==
The rules are quite similar to those of team handball, but there are also some major differences:

- size of the field: 45 × 30 meters
- size of the goal: height 240 cm, width 200 cm
- size of the ball: 580 to 605 mm
- the field is divided into three areas: defence third, middle third, offence third
- player positions are called: goalkeeper (1), defender (1), halfback (2), forward (3)
- the player cannot hold the ball longer than three seconds, he or she can throw the ball upon the head or bounce ball back off ground – maximum of two times, no limit in steps
- shooting on the goal is made in front of the goal area – leaning out or jumping is possible, but the fall has to be outside the goal area
- goalkeeper and defender can step into their own goal area; forwards can step in the opponent's goal area, but they cannot shoot from there
- defender and halfbacks cannot step in the offence third, forwards cannot step in the defence third, and there are some more rules for crossing between the thirds
- players may be sent off for five (single yellow) or ten minutes (double yellow)
