= Jolana Neméthová =

Slovak handball player (born 1954)

Jolana Neméthová (born March 17, 1954, in Topoľníky) is a former Czechoslovak/Slovak handball player who competed in the 1980 Summer Olympics.

In 1980 she was part of the Czechoslovak team which finished fifth in the Olympic tournament. She played all five matches and scored four goals.
