= Mária Končeková =

Slovak handball player (born 1953)

Mária Končeková (born August 11, 1953 in Partizánske) is a former Czechoslovak/Slovak handball player who competed in the 1980 Summer Olympics.

In 1980 she was part of the Czechoslovak team which finished fifth in the Olympic tournament. She played three matches as goalkeeper.
