= Věra Datínská =

Czech handball player

Personal information
- Nationality: Czech
- Born: 17 October 1949 (age 76) Brno, Czechoslovakia

Sport
- Sport: Handball

Věra Datínská (born 17 October 1949) is a Czech handball player. She competed in the women's tournament at the 1980 Summer Olympics.

Since the late 1960s she played handball for Inter of Bratislava. In 1975 with it for the first time in the history of the club won gold medals in the Czechoslovak championship. In 1978 and 1979 she was twice more national champion with Inter. In 1970 and 1978 she won the Czechoslovak Cup. Participated in the European Champions Cup and Cup Winners' Cup.
