= Olha Zubaryeva =

Soviet handball player (born 1958)

Olympic medal record

Women's Handball
Gold medal – first place	1980 Moscow	Team

Olha Valentinivna Zubaryeva (Ukrainian: Ольга Валентинівна Зубарєва, born January 27, 1958) is a former Soviet/Ukrainian handball player who competed in the 1980 Summer Olympics.

In 1980 she won the gold medal with the Soviet team. She played all five matches and scored 21 goals.
