= Tajikistan women's national handball team =

Tajikistan

Information
- Association: Tajikistan Handball Association

Colours
1st	2nd

Results

Asian Championship
- Appearances: none (First in n/a)
- Best result: n/a
- Last updated on Unknown.

The Tajikistan women's national handball team represents Tajikistan in international handball competitions and is controlled by Tajikistan Handball Association.

The Team is yet to compete in any major tournaments at senior level. However the team plays friendly matches and competes at Asian tournaments at junior level.

== Tournament record ==
=== Asian Championship ===
- Yet to participate.

=== Asian Games ===
- Yet to participate.
