= Katarína Lamrichová =

Slovak handball player (born 1956)

Katarína Lamrichová (née Beňušková, born October 21, 1956, in Partizánske) is a former Czechoslovak/Slovak handball player who competed in the 1980 Summer Olympics.

In 1980 she was part of the Czechoslovak team which finished fifth in the Olympic tournament. She played in all five matches and scored two goals.
