= Piroska Reichard =

Hungarian poet and translator

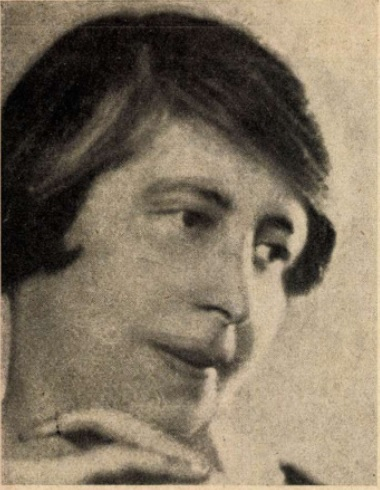
- Reichard Piroska is a poet, literary translator, critic
- Born: 26 September 1884; Beregszász, Kingdom of Hungary, Austria-Hungary
- Died: 1 January 1943 (aged 58); Budapest, Hungary
- Education: University of Budapest
- Occupations: Poet, critic, translator
- Writing career
- Language: Hungarian
- Notable works: Az életen kívül (1911); Őszi üdvözlet (1922).
- Notable awards: Baumgarten Prize (1932)

Piroska Reichard (Hungarian: Reichard Piroska; 26 September 1884 – 1 January 1943) was a Hungarian-Jewish poet, critic, and translator.

== Biography ==
Piroska Reichard was born in Carpathian Ruthenia to Jewish parents Ernesztina (née Friedmann) and Márk Reichard. She attended secondary school in Miskolc and went on to complete a teacher's diploma and doctorate at the University of Budapest. She afterwards became a high school teacher.

Her work first appeared in the literary journal Nyugat, to which she became a regular contributor, publishing some eighty pieces between 1908 and 1941. She also translated into Hungarian the works of Nietzsche, Edgar Allan Poe, and others, and wrote essays, short stories, and children's literature. She was best known, however, for her poetry, which frequently explored the theme of solitude. Her most notable collections of verse are Az életen kívül ('Out of Life,' 1911) and Őszi üdvözlet ('Autumn Greetings,' 1922).

Reichard's work was recognized by a Baumgarten Prize in 1932. She fled persecution during the Holocaust in Hungary, ultimately committing suicide on 1 January 1943.

== Partial bibliography ==
- Telamon históriája [History of Telamon] (Doctoral thesis). 1909.
- Az életen kívül [Out of Life]. Magyar költők. Vol. VII. Budapest: Athenaeum. 1911.
- Őszi üdvözlet [Autumn Greetings]. Budapest: Dick. 1922.
- "Babits angol irodalmi tanulmányai" [Babits's studies in English literature]. Nyugat (7). 1924.
- Nietzsche, Friedrich (1924). Jón, rosszon túl. Előjáték egy jövőbeli filozófiához [Beyond Good and Evil: Prelude to a Philosophy of the Future]. Translated by Reichard, Piroska. Budapest: Világirodalom.
- "A Felszín" [The Surface]. Nyugat (21). 1928.
- "Osvát Ernő Jegyzetei" [Notes of Ernő Osvát]. Nyugat (21). 1933.
- A változó napokkal [With the Changing Days]. Budapest: Nyugat. 1936.
- "A Szentírás Babits Mihály költeményeiben" [Scripture in the poems of Mihály Babits]. IMIT Évkönyv. 1942.
