= Soviet Union women's national handball team =

Former women's national handball team representing the Soviet Union

Information

Colours
1st	2nd

Results

Summer Olympics
- Appearances: 3 (First in 1976)
- Best result: (gold) 1st (1976, 1980)

World Championship
- Appearances: 7 (First in 1962)
- Best result: (gold) 1st (1982, 1986, 1990)
- Last updated on Unknown.

Soviet Union women's national handball team
Medal record

Olympic Games
Gold medal – first place	1976 Montreal	Team
Gold medal – first place	1980 Moscow	Team
Bronze medal – third place	1988 Seoul	Team

World Championship
Gold medal – first place	1982 Hungary	
Gold medal – first place	1986 Netherlands	
Gold medal – first place	1990 South Korea	
Silver medal – second place	1975 Soviet Union	
Silver medal – second place	1978 Czechoslovakia	
Bronze medal – third place	1973 Yugoslavia	

The USSR women's national handball team was the national women's handball team of the Soviet Union. It was considered one of the strongest national teams in the world, and won 2 Olympic gold medals and 3 world championships. Together with their successor, Russia, they are the only women's team to have won three successive World Championships (Denmarks men's team equalled the record in 2023, and later broke it in 2025).

The Soviet Handball Federation joined IHF in 1958, and in 1962 the women's national team was founded. Their first major international tournament was the 1962 World Women's Handball Championship, where they finished 6th.

The last major international tournament for the Soviet Union was the 1992 Olympics, where they competed as the Unified team.

== Competitive record ==
Champions Runners-up Third place Fourth place

=== Olympic Games ===
Year	Position	GP	W	D	L	GS	GA	GD
(Canada) 1976	1st (gold)	5	5	0	0	92	40	+52
(Soviet Union) 1980	1st (gold)	5	5	0	0	99	52	+47
(United States) 1984	Boycott							
(South Korea) 1988	3rd (bronze)	5	3	1	1	112	85	+27
Total	3/4	15	13	1	1	303	177	+126

=== World Championship ===
Year	Position	GP	W	D	L	GS	GA	GD
(Socialist Federal Republic of Yugoslavia) 1957	Did not enter							
(Romania) 1962	6th	5	1	0	4	35	56	−21
(West Germany) 1965	Did not qualify							
(Netherlands) 1971	Did not qualify							
(Socialist Federal Republic of Yugoslavia) 1973	3rd	5	3	1	1	50	39	+11
(Soviet Union) 1975	2nd	7	5	1	1	118	70	+48
(Czechoslovakia) 1978	2nd	7	6	0	1	126	69	+57
(Hungary) 1982	1st	7	6	0	1	128	109	+19
(Netherlands) 1986	1st	6	5	1	0	138	96	+42
(South Korea) 1990	1st	6	6	0	0	150	128	+22
Total	7/10	43	32	3	8	745	567	+178

=== Other competitions ===
- Carpathian Trophy 1968 – 3rd
- Carpathian Trophy 1969 – 3rd
- Carpathian Trophy 1970 – 5th
- Carpathian Trophy 1971 – 6th
- Carpathian Trophy 1972 – 3rd
- Carpathian Trophy 1973 – 5th
- Carpathian Trophy 1974 – 4th
- Carpathian Trophy 1975 – 5th
- Carpathian Trophy 1977 – 4th
- Carpathian Trophy 1978 – 3rd
- Carpathian Trophy 1979 – 4th
- Carpathian Trophy 1980 – 3rd
- Carpathian Trophy 1981 – 2nd
- Carpathian Trophy 1982 – 3rd

== National teams of the former Soviet republics ==
Armenia
Azerbaijan
Belarus
Estonia
Georgia
Kazakhstan
Kyrgyzstan
Latvia
Lithuania
Moldova
Russia
Tajikistan
Turkmenistan
Ukraine
Uzbekistan
