= Viola Pavlasová =

Slovak handball player (born 1957)

Viola Pavlasová (born May 14, 1957, in Bratislava) is a former Czechoslovak/Slovak handball player who competed in the 1980 Summer Olympics.

In 1980 she was part of the Czechoslovak team which finished fifth in the Olympic tournament. She played all five matches and scored three goals.
