= Daniela Trandžíková =

Slovak handball player (born 1956)

Personal information
- Nationality: Slovak
- Born: Daniela Nováková; 26 October 1956 Trenčín, Czechoslovakia
- Died: 26 October 2014 (aged 58)

Sport
- Sport: Handball

Daniela Trandžíková (26 October 1956 – 26 October 2014) was a Slovak handball player. She competed at the 1980 Summer Olympics and the 1988 Summer Olympics. In 1980, 1981 and 1988 she was named the best female handball player of Czechoslovakia. She played 311 matches for the Czechoslovakia national team and scored 657 goals. She died of an unspecified illness on her 58th birthday.
