= Jana Kuťková =

Slovak handball player (born 1951)

Jana Kuťková (born February 14, 1951, in Bratislava) is a former Czechoslovak/Slovak handball player who competed in the 1980 Summer Olympics.

In 1980, she was part of the Czechoslovak team that finished fifth in the Olympic tournament. She played all five matches and scored 22 goals.
