= Priska Polačeková =

Slovak handball player (born 1954)

Priska "Piroška" Polačeková (born October 29, 1954, in Dunajská Streda) is a former Czechoslovak/Slovak handball player who competed in the 1980 Summer Olympics.

In 1980 she was part of the Czechoslovak team which finished fifth in the Olympic tournament. She played all five matches and scored four goals.
