= Angélique Abemane =

Congolese handball player

Personal information
- Nationality: Congolese

Sport
- Sport: Handball
- Event: 1980 Summer Olympics

Angélique Abemane is a female Congolese handball player. She competed in the 1980 Summer Olympics.
