= Yvonne Makouala =

Congolese handball player

Personal information
- Nationality: Congolese

Sport
- Sport: Handball

Yvonne Makouala is a Congolese handball player. She competed in the women's tournament at the 1980 Summer Olympics.
