= 2029 World Women's Handball Championship =

Campeonato Mundial de Balonmano Femenino de 2029

Tournament details
- Host country: Spain
- Teams: 32 (from 5 confederations)

The 2029 IHF World Women's Handball Championship, will be the 29th event hosted by the International Handball Federation. It will take place in Spain in December 2029.

== Bidding process ==
In April 2023, the IHF stated that they were looking for bids. In the end, two nations expressed interest in hosting the tournament.

- China and Russia

The bids were confirmed on 1 March 2024:

- Spain

Spain was unanimously awarded on 16 April 2024 in Créteil, France.

== Venues ==
The proposed venues are:

- Valencia – Roig Arena, capacity 16,000
- Málaga – Martín Carpena, capacity 11,300
- Santiago de Compostela – Fontes do Sar, capacity 6,666
- Irun – IAM Irun, capacity 5,000

The proposed venues are Galicia, Valencia, Málaga and Irún, with the latter to host the final phase.

== Qualification ==
Competition	Dates	Host	Vacancies	Qualified
Host nation	16 April 2024	(France) Créteil	1	Spain
2027 World Championship	December 2027	Hungary	1	
2028 European Championship	30 November–17 December 2028	Denmark; Norway; Sweden	4 + ?	
European qualification			4 + ?	
2028 Asian Championship			4 + ?	
2028 South and Central American Championship			3 + ?	
2028 African Championship			4 + ?	
2029 Nor.Ca. Women's Championship			1 + ?	
Wild card			1 or 2^{[1]}	

1. If countries from Oceania (Australia or New Zealand) participating in the Asian Championships finish within the top 5, they will qualify for the World Championships. If either finishes sixth or lower, the place would have been transferred to the wild card spot.

== Qualified teams ==
Team	Qualification method	Date of qualification	Appearance(s)				Previous best performance (Note: Bold text indicates they hosted that edition.)
Team	Qualification method	Date of qualification	Total	First	Last	Streak	Previous best performance
Spain	Host	16 April 2024	13th or 14th	1993	2025	1	Runners-up (2019)
