= Piroska Budai =

Hungarian handball player (born 1955)

Piroska Budai (born 18 May 1955 in Egyek) is a former Hungarian handball player who competed in the 1980 Summer Olympics.

In 1980 she was a member of the Hungarian team which finished fourth. She played four matches and scored two goals.
