= 1990 World Women's Handball Championship =

1990 edition of the World Women's Handball Championship

Tournament details
- Host country: South Korea
- Dates: 24 November – 4 December
- Teams: 16

Final positions
- Champions: Soviet Union (3rd title)
- Runners-up: Yugoslavia
- Third place: East Germany

Tournament statistics
- Matches played: 54
- Goals scored: 2,357 (43.65 per match)
- Top scorer: (Poland) Bożena Karkut (50 goals)

The 1990 World Women's Handball Championship was the 10th edition of the tournament. It took place in South Korea between 24 November to 4 December 1990. It was the first World Championship not played in a European country. The championship was held after the German reunification, although East and West Germany participated separately.

== Qualification ==
Host nation

- South Korea

Qualified from the 1988 Summer Olympics

- Norway
- Soviet Union
- Yugoslavia

Qualified from the 1989 World Championship B

- Austria
- Bulgaria
- Denmark
- East Germany
- France
- Poland
- Romania
- Sweden
- West Germany

Qualified from the 1989 Asian Women's Handball Championship

- China

Qualified from the 1989 Pan American Women's Handball Championship

- Canada

Qualified from the 1989 African Women's Handball Championship

- Angola

== Main round ==
Team will compete for Places 1–2
Team will compete for Places 3–4

=== Group 1 ===
Team	Pld	W	D	L	GF	GA	GD	Pts
Yugoslavia	5	4	0	1	124	102	+22	8
West Germany	5	3	0	2	109	100	+9	6
Austria	5	3	0	2	101	111	−10	6
China	5	3	0	2	108	119	−11	6
Poland	5	2	0	3	117	103	+14	4
South Korea	5	0	0	5	101	135	−34	0

=== Results ===
Yugoslavia	19–18*	Poland

Austria	19–18*	South Korea

West Germany	21–18*	Poland

China	28–22*	South Korea

Yugoslavia	21–18*	West Germany

China	22–21*	Austria

Yugoslavia	28–24	South Korea

Austria	24–20	West Germany

Poland	31–17	China

Poland	29–14	South Korea

West Germany	19–14	China

Yugoslavia	30–15	Austria

Austria	22–21	Poland

West Germany	31–23	South Korea

China	27–26	Yugoslavia

- * Results carried over from Preliminary Round

=== Group 2 ===
Team	Pld	W	D	L	GF	GA	GD	Pts
Soviet Union	5	5	0	0	126	106	+20	10
East Germany	5	3	1	1	111	90	+21	7
Norway	5	3	0	2	89	90	−1	6
Romania	5	1	1	3	90	100	−10	3
Denmark	5	1	0	4	97	103	−6	2
Bulgaria	5	1	0	4	99	123	−24	2

=== Results ===
East Germany	23 : 19*	Denmark
Norway	22 : 18*	Bulgaria
Soviet Union	21 : 17*	Denmark
Romania	18 : 17*	Bulgaria
Soviet Union	21 : 20*	East Germany
Norway	13 : 12*	Romania
Soviet Union	33 : 23	Bulgaria
East Germany	15 : 15	Romania
Norway	20 : 16	Denmark
Bulgaria	20 : 19	Denmark
East Germany	22 : 14	Norway
Soviet Union	29 : 26	Romania
East Germany	31 : 21	Bulgaria
Denmark	26 : 19	Romania
Soviet Union	22 : 20	Norway

- Results carried over from Preliminary Round

== Finals ==
Date
04.12.1990	3/4	East Germany	25 : 19	West Germany
04.12.1990	1/2	Soviet Union	24 : 22	Yugoslavia

== Final standings ==
#	Team
	Soviet Union
	Yugoslavia
	East Germany
4.	West Germany
5.	Austria
6.	Norway
7.	Romania
8.	China
9.	Poland
10.	Denmark
11.	South Korea
12.	Bulgaria
13.	Sweden
14.	France
15.	Canada
16.	Angola
