= Solange Koulinka =

Congolese handball player

Personal information
- Nationality: Congolese
- Born: 1958 (age 67–68)

Sport
- Sport: Handball

Solange Koulinka (born 1958) is a Congolese handball player. She competed in the women's tournament at the 1980 Summer Olympics.
