= Madeleine Mitsotso =

Congolese handball player (died 2018)

Personal information
- Nationality: Congolese
- Died: 8 May 2018

Sport
- Sport: Handball

Madeleine Mitsotso (died 8 May 2018) was a Congolese handball player. She competed in the women's tournament at the 1980 Summer Olympics.
