= Yugoslavia women's national handball team =

Information
- Nickname: Plavi/Blues
- Association: Handball Federation of Yugoslavia

Colours
1st	2nd

Results

Summer Olympics
- Appearances: 3 (First in 1980)
- Best result: (gold) 1st (1984)

World Championship
- Appearances: 10 (First in 1957)
- Best result: (gold) 1st (1973)
- Last updated on Unknown.

Yugoslavia women's national handball team
Medal record

Olympic Games
Gold medal – first place	1984 Los Angeles	Team
Silver medal – second place	1980 Moscow	Team

World Championship
Gold medal – first place	1934 Great Britain	
Gold medal – first place	1973 Yugoslavia	
Silver medal – second place	1930 Czechoslovakia	
Silver medal – second place	1965 West Germany	
Silver medal – second place	1971 Netherlands	
Silver medal – second place	1990 South Korea	
Bronze medal – third place	1957 Yugoslavia	
Bronze medal – third place	1982 Hungary	

Mediterranean Games
Gold medal – first place	1979 Split	
Gold medal – first place	1991 Athens	

The Yugoslavia women's national handball team was the national handball team of Yugoslavia.

== History ==
The 1st World Women's Handball Championship was held in Yugoslavia from July 13 to 20, 1957. The games were held in Belgrade and Virovitica.Although it is a world championship, only European teams are participating in this first edition. Furthermore, if it is played outdoors, it is the first edition of the competition with teams of seven players and therefore stands out from the previous eleven-a-side World Handball Championships.8,000 spectators attended the final between Czechoslovakia and Hungary, for a 7-1 victory for the Czechoslovaks. Yugoslavia won the Bronze medal beating West Germany 9-6. Yugoslavia participated in ten World Championships and three Olympic Games. The result was 6 World Cup medals and two Olympic medals. The biggest successes are the gold medal at the 1984 Olympic Games, the gold medal at the 1973 World Championship, as well as the gold medals at the 1979, 1991 Mediterranean Games. The 5th World Women's Handball Championship was held in Yugoslavia from December 7 to December 15, 1973, organized by the IHF.The games were held in Belgrade, Zagreb, Sarajevo, Varazdin, Sibenik, Negotin and Zavidovici.A total of twelve teams competed. Hosts Yugoslavia secured the title with a 16:11 win against Romania and became world champions.

== Competitive record ==
Champions Runners-up Third place Fourth place

== Olympic Games ==
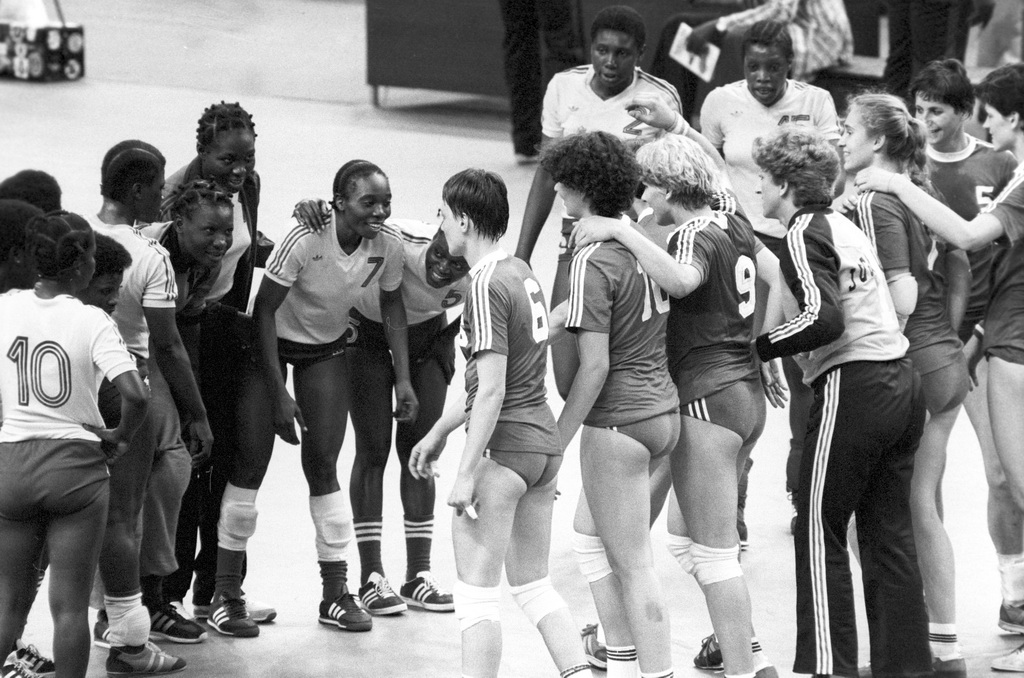
Yugoslavia vs Congo 1980 Olympics

Year	Position	GP	W	D	L	GS	GA	GD
(Canada) 1976	Did not qualify							
(Soviet Union) 1980	2nd (silver)	5	3	1	1	107	67	+40
(United States) 1984	1st (gold)	5	5	0	0	143	102	+41
(South Korea) 1988	4th	6	3	0	3	110	115	-5
(Spain) 1992	Qualified and later Suspended							
Total	4/5	16	11	1	4	360	284	+76

== World Championship ==
Czech handball	Round	Position
(Czech Republic) 1930 Prague	Runners Up	2nd of 3
(United Kingdom) 1934 London	Champions	1st of 3
Total	2/2	1 Titles

Year	Position	GP	W	D	L	GS	GA	GD
(Socialist Federal Republic of Yugoslavia) 1957	3rd	5	4	0	1	41	32	+9
(Romania) 1962	4th	5	2	1	2	28	23	+5
(West Germany) 1965	2nd	4	3	0	1	31	20	+11
(Netherlands) 1971	2nd	5	3	1	1	57	44	+13
(Socialist Federal Republic of Yugoslavia) 1973	1st	6	5	0	1	73	49	+24
(Soviet Union) 1975	5th	7	3	1	3	116	75	+41
(Czechoslovakia) 1978	5th	7	3	1	3	112	106	+6
(Hungary) 1982	3rd	7	5	1	1	160	122	+38
(Netherlands) 1986	6th	7	4	1	2	150	132	+18
(South Korea) 1990	2nd	7	5	0	2	169	144	+25
Total	10/10	60	37	6	17	937	747	+190

== Mediterranean Games ==
Games	Round	Position
(Socialist Federal Republic of Yugoslavia) 1979 Split	Champions	1st of 7
(Morocco) 1983 Casablanca	women's tournament was canceled	
(Ba'athist Syria) 1987 Latakia	Didn't Participate	
(Greece) 1991 Athens	Champions	1st of 8
Total	2/2	2 Titles

== Other competitions ==
- Carpathian Trophy 1967 – 3rd
- Carpathian Trophy 1968 – 2nd
- Carpathian Trophy 1969 – 4th
- Carpathian Trophy 1970 – 6th
- Carpathian Trophy 1971 – 4th
- Carpathian Trophy 1972 – 2nd
- Carpathian Trophy 1973 – 3rd
- Carpathian Trophy 1974 – 3rd
- Carpathian Trophy 1977 – 1st
- Carpathian Trophy 1978 – 5th
- Carpathian Trophy 1986 – 2nd

== National teams of the former Yugoslav republics ==
Bosnia and Herzegovina
Croatia
Kosovo
Montenegro
North Macedonia
Serbia
Slovenia

== See also ==
- Bosnia and Herzegovina women's national handball team
- Croatia women's national handball team
- Kosovo women's national handball team
- Montenegro women's national handball team
- North Macedonia women's national handball team
- Serbia women's national handball team
- Slovenia women's national handball team
