= 1957 World Women's Handball Championship =

1957 edition of the World Women's Handball Championship

Tournament details
- Host country: Yugoslavia
- Dates: July 13 – July 20
- Teams: 9

Final positions
- Champions: Czechoslovakia (1st title)
- Runners-up: Hungary
- Third place: Yugoslavia

Tournament statistics
- Matches played: 21
- Goals scored: 232 (11.05 per match)
- Top scorer(s): (Czech Republic) Pavla Bartáková (11 goals)

The 1957 World Women's Handball Championship was the first Women's world Championship. It took place in Virovitica, PR Croatia and Belgrade, PR Serbia within FPR Yugoslavia in 1957.

== Preliminary round ==
=== Group A ===
Team	Pld	W	D	L	GF	GA	GD	Pts
Denmark	2	2	0	0	15	5	+10	4
Austria	2	1	0	1	7	10	−3	2
Romania	2	0	0	2	2	9	−7	0

13 July 1957	Austria	3–1	Romania
14 July 1957	Denmark	6–1	Romania
15 July 1957	Denmark	9–4	Austria

=== Group B ===
Team	Pld	W	D	L	GF	GA	GD	Pts
Czechoslovakia	2	2	0	0	13	8	+5	4
Hungary	2	1	0	1	13	10	+3	2
Sweden	2	0	0	2	6	14	−8	0

13 July 1957	Hungary	9–2	Sweden
14 July 1957	Czechoslovakia	5–4	Sweden
15 July 1957	Czechoslovakia	8–4	Hungary

=== Group C ===
Team	Pld	W	D	L	GF	GA	GD	Pts
Yugoslavia	2	2	0	0	18	9	+9	4
West Germany	2	1	0	1	13	11	+2	2
Poland	2	0	0	2	7	18	−11	0

13 July 1957	Yugoslavia	11–3	Poland
14 July 1957	West Germany	7–4	Poland
15 July 1957	Yugoslavia	7–6	West Germany

== Main round ==
Team will compete for Places 1–2
Team will compete for Places 3–4

=== Group I ===
Team	Pld	W	D	L	GF	GA	GD	Pts
Hungary	2	1	1	0	15	9	+6	3
Yugoslavia	2	1	0	1	14	17	−3	2
Denmark	2	0	1	1	12	15	−3	1

17 July 1957	Hungary	10–4	Yugoslavia
18 July 1957	Hungary	5–5	Denmark
19 July 1957	Yugoslavia	10–7	Denmark

=== Group II ===
Team	Pld	W	D	L	GF	GA	GD	Pts
Czechoslovakia	2	2	0	0	22	7	+15	4
West Germany	2	1	0	1	14	18	−4	2
Austria	2	0	0	2	11	22	−11	0

17 July 1957	Czechoslovakia	12–3	Austria
18 July 1957	West Germany	10–8	Austria
19 July 1957	Czechoslovakia	10–4	West Germany

== Classification round ==
Team	Pld	W	D	L	GF	GA	GD	Pts
Poland	2	2	0	0	7	1	+6	4
Sweden	2	1	0	1	3	5	−2	2
Romania	2	0	0	2	1	5	−4	0

17 July 1957	Poland	4–1	Sweden
18 July 1957	Sweden	2–1	Romania
20 July 1957	Poland	3–0	Romania

== Finals ==
5th/6th places	20 July 1957	Denmark	10–6	Austria
3rd/4th places	20 July 1957	Yugoslavia	9–6	West Germany
1st/2nd places	20 July 1957	Czechoslovakia	7–1	Hungary

Source: IHF Archive

== Final standings ==
=== Final ranking ===
Rank	Team
Gold medal	Czechoslovakia
Silver medal	Hungary
Bronze medal	Yugoslavia
4	West Germany
5	Denmark
6	Austria
7	Poland
8	Sweden
9	Romania

1957 Women's World Champions

Czechoslovakia
First Title

Team roster: Anna Čápová (Ríšová), Věra Aschenbrenerová, Vlasta Čiháková, Jana Housková, Stanislava Kučerová, Květa Marzinová, Květa Janečková, Pavla Bartáková, Věra Dvořáková, Blanka Kotlínová, Jana Maléřová and Veronika Schmidtová (Ilavská).
Trainers: Karel Hošťalek, Ladislav Gross
