= 1975 World Women's Handball Championship =

1975 edition of the World Women's Handball Championship

Tournament details
- Host country: Soviet Union
- Venues: 3 (in 3 host cities)
- Dates: 2 December - 13 December
- Teams: 12 (from 4 confederations)

Final positions
- Champions: East Germany (2nd title)
- Runners-up: Soviet Union
- Third place: Hungary

Tournament statistics
- Matches played: 36
- Goals scored: 985 (27.36 per match)
- Top scorer: (Soviet Union) Tatjana Makarez (35 goals)

The 1975 World Women's Handball Championship took place in the Soviet Union between 2-13 December 1975. It was the sixth edition of the World Women's Handball Championship and the first to be held in the Soviet Union.

East Germany won their second title after they finished top of the final group ahead of the Soviet Union and Hungary.

== Qualification ==
Host nation

- Soviet Union

Defending champions

- Yugoslavia

Qualified from the 1974 African Championship

- Tunisia

Qualified from Asia

- Japan

Qualified from the Americas

- United States

Qualified from European play-offs

- Czechoslovakia
- Denmark
- East Germany
- Hungary
- Norway
- Poland
- Romania

== Preliminary round ==
=== Group A ===
Team	Pld	W	D	L	GF	GA	GD	Pts
Romania	3	3	0	0	57	34	+23	6
Czechoslovakia	3	2	0	1	48	45	+3	4
Norway	3	1	0	2	38	42	−4	2
Japan	3	0	0	3	39	61	−22	0

3 December 1975	Romania	24–18	Japan	Vilnius Palace of Concerts and Sports, Vilnius
3 December 1975		(12–8)		Vilnius Palace of Concerts and Sports, Vilnius

3 December 1975	Czechoslovakia	21–12	Norway	Vilnius Palace of Concerts and Sports, Vilnius
3 December 1975		(11-6)		Vilnius Palace of Concerts and Sports, Vilnius

4 December 1975	Romania	13–10	Norway	Vilnius Palace of Concerts and Sports, Vilnius
4 December 1975		(6–3)		Vilnius Palace of Concerts and Sports, Vilnius

4 December 1975	Czechoslovakia	21–13	Japan	Vilnius Palace of Concerts and Sports, Vilnius
4 December 1975		(10–3)		Vilnius Palace of Concerts and Sports, Vilnius

5 December 1975	Romania	20–6	Czechoslovakia	Vilnius Palace of Concerts and Sports, Vilnius
5 December 1975		(9–2)		Vilnius Palace of Concerts and Sports, Vilnius

5 December 1975	Norway	16–8	Japan	Vilnius Palace of Concerts and Sports, Vilnius
5 December 1975		(9–5)		Vilnius Palace of Concerts and Sports, Vilnius

=== Group B ===
Team	Pld	W	D	L	GF	GA	GD	Pts
Yugoslavia	3	3	0	0	68	20	+48	6
Hungary	3	2	0	1	53	26	+27	4
Denmark	3	1	0	2	43	41	+2	2
Tunisia	3	0	0	3	17	94	−77	0

3 December 1975	Hungary	17–9	Denmark	Rostov-on-Don
3 December 1975		(7–6)		Rostov-on-Don

3 December 1975	Yugoslavia	41–3	Tunisia	Rostov-on-Don
3 December 1975		(20–2)		Rostov-on-Don

4 December 1975	Hungary	28–6	Tunisia	Rostov-on-Don
4 December 1975		(14–3)		Rostov-on-Don

4 December 1975	Yugoslavia	16–9	Denmark	Rostov-on-Don
4 December 1975		(7–5)		Rostov-on-Don

5 December 1975	Yugoslavia	11–8	Hungary	Rostov-on-Don
5 December 1975		(7–6)		Rostov-on-Don

5 December 1975	Denmark	25–8	Tunisia	Rostov-on-Don
5 December 1975		(13–4)		Rostov-on-Don

=== Group C ===
Team	Pld	W	D	L	GF	GA	GD	Pts
East Germany	3	2	1	0	63	24	+39	5
Soviet Union	3	2	1	0	58	22	+36	5
Poland	3	1	0	2	35	45	−10	2
United States	3	0	0	3	18	83	−65	0

3 December 1975	East Germany	24–6	Poland	Kyiv
3 December 1975		(9–4)		Kyiv

3 December 1975	Soviet Union	33–4	United States	Kyiv
3 December 1975		(11–2)		Kyiv

4 December 1975	Poland	21–6	United States	Kyiv
4 December 1975		(10–3)		Kyiv

4 December 1975	East Germany	10–10	Soviet Union	Kyiv
4 December 1975		(6–6)		Kyiv

5 December 1975	East Germany	29–8	United States	Kyiv
5 December 1975		(15–3)		Kyiv

5 December 1975	Soviet Union	15–8	Poland	Kyiv
5 December 1975		(9–3)		Kyiv

== Final round ==
=== Group 10-12 ===
Team	Pld	W	D	L	GF	GA	GD	Pts
Japan	2	2	0	0	43	20	+23	4
United States	2	1	0	1	24	30	−6	2
Tunisia	2	0	0	2	23	40	−17	0

7 December 1975	Japan	17–10	United States	Vilnius Palace of Concerts and Sports, Vilnius
7 December 1975		(6–5)		Vilnius Palace of Concerts and Sports, Vilnius

8 December 1975	United States	14–13	Tunisia	Vilnius Palace of Concerts and Sports, Vilnius
8 December 1975		(9–8)		Vilnius Palace of Concerts and Sports, Vilnius

9 December 1975	Japan	26–10	Tunisia	Vilnius Palace of Concerts and Sports, Vilnius
9 December 1975		(14–3)		Vilnius Palace of Concerts and Sports, Vilnius

=== Group 7-9 ===
Team	Pld	W	D	L	GF	GA	GD	Pts
Poland	2	2	0	0	30	20	+10	4
Norway	2	1	0	1	23	24	−1	2
Denmark	2	0	0	2	19	28	−9	0

7 December 1975	Poland	14–11	Norway	Vilnius Palace of Concerts and Sports, Vilnius
7 December 1975		(9–5)		Vilnius Palace of Concerts and Sports, Vilnius

8 December 1975	Poland	16–9	Denmark	Vilnius Palace of Concerts and Sports, Vilnius
8 December 1975		(9–5)		Vilnius Palace of Concerts and Sports, Vilnius

9 December 1975	Norway	12–10	Denmark	Vilnius Palace of Concerts and Sports, Vilnius
9 December 1975		(8–4)		Vilnius Palace of Concerts and Sports, Vilnius

=== Final Group ===
Team	Pld	W	D	L	GF	GA	GD	Pts
East Germany	5	4	1	0	60	49	+11	9
Soviet Union	5	3	1	1	70	58	+12	7
Hungary	5	3	0	2	52	46	+6	6
Romania	5	2	0	3	65	55	+10	4
Yugoslavia	5	1	1	3	59	63	−4	3
Czechoslovakia	5	0	1	4	43	78	−35	1

7 December 1975	East Germany	10–9	Hungary	Kyiv
7 December 1975		(6–6)		Kyiv

7 December 1975; 16:15	Soviet Union	17–16	Romania	Kyiv
7 December 1975; 16:15		(13–8)		Kyiv

7 December 1975	Yugoslavia	13–13	Czechoslovakia	Kyiv
7 December 1975		(7–4)		Kyiv

9 December 1975	East Germany	13–12	Yugoslavia	Kyiv
9 December 1975		(7–6)		Kyiv

9 December 1975	Soviet Union	16–8	Czechoslovakia	Kyiv
9 December 1975		(12–2)		Kyiv

9 December 1975; 18:15	Hungary	11–10	Romania	Kyiv
9 December 1975; 18:15		(9–6)		Kyiv

11 December 1975	Soviet Union	17–12	Yugoslavia	Kyiv
11 December 1975		(7–6)		Kyiv

11 December 1975	Hungary	12–5	Czechoslovakia	Kyiv
11 December 1975		(6–1)		Kyiv

11 December 1975; 18:15	East Germany	10–7	Romania	Kyiv
11 December 1975; 18:15		(5–4)		Kyiv

13 December 1975; 14:30	Romania	12–11	Yugoslavia	Kyiv
13 December 1975; 14:30		(6–6)		Kyiv

13 December 1975	East Germany	17–11	Czechoslovakia	Kyiv
13 December 1975		(7–7)		Kyiv

13 December 1975	Hungary	12–10	Soviet Union	Kyiv
13 December 1975		(6–5)		Kyiv

== Final standings ==
#	Team
Gold medal	East Germany
Silver medal	Soviet Union
Bronze medal	Hungary
4	Romania
5	Yugoslavia
6	Czechoslovakia
7	Poland
8	Norway
9	Denmark
10	Japan
11	United States
12	Tunisia
