= 1986 World Women's Handball Championship =

1986 edition of the World Women's Handball Championship

Tournament details
- Host country: Netherlands
- Dates: 04 December to 14 December 1986
- Teams: 16 (from 4 confederations)

Final positions
- Champions: Soviet Union (2nd title)
- Runners-up: Czechoslovakia
- Third place: Norway

Tournament statistics
- Matches played: 54
- Goals scored: 2,212 (40.96 per match)
- Top scorer: (Soviet Union) Natalya Kirtchik (61 goals)

The 1986 World Women's Handball Championship took place in the Netherlands between 4–14 December 1986.

== Qualification ==
Host nation

- Netherlands

Qualified from the 1984 Summer Olympics

- Yugoslavia
- South Korea
- China

Qualified from the 1985 World Championship B

- East Germany
- Hungary
- West Germany
- Czechoslovakia
- Soviet Union
- Norway
- Poland
- Romania
- France

Qualified from Asia

- Japan

Qualified from the 1986 Pan American Women's Handball Championship

- United States

Qualified from the 1985 African Women's Handball Championship

- Congo (later replaced by Austria)

== Preliminary round ==
=== Group A ===
Team	Pld	W	D	L	GF	GA	GD	Pts
Soviet Union	3	2	1	0	68	44	+24	5
Yugoslavia	3	2	1	0	63	43	+20	5
Austria	3	1	0	2	47	69	−22	2
Poland	3	0	0	3	45	67	−22	0

4 December 1986; 18:30	Yugoslavia	25–15	Poland	Heerlen
4 December 1986; 18:30		(11–5)		Heerlen

4 December 1986; 20:30	Soviet Union	30–15	Austria	Heerlen
4 December 1986; 20:30		(11–9)		Heerlen

6 December 1986; 18:30	Yugoslavia	24–14	Austria	Weert
6 December 1986; 18:30		(14–7)		Weert

6 December 1986; 20:30	Soviet Union	24–15	Poland	Weert
6 December 1986; 20:30		(13–8)		Weert

7 December 1986; 14:00	Austria	18–15	Poland	Sittard
7 December 1986; 14:00		(9–10)		Sittard

7 December 1986; 16:00	Soviet Union	14–14	Yugoslavia	Sittard
7 December 1986; 16:00		(9–7)		Sittard

=== Group B ===
Team	Pld	W	D	L	GF	GA	GD	Pts
East Germany	3	2	1	0	71	39	+32	5
Hungary	3	2	1	0	65	48	+17	5
Netherlands	3	1	0	2	55	72	−17	2
United States	3	0	0	3	39	71	−32	0

4 December 1986; 18:30	Hungary	30–15	United States	Groningen
4 December 1986; 18:30		(13–4)		Groningen

4 December 1986; 20:30	East Germany	34–18	Netherlands	Groningen
4 December 1986; 20:30		(14–9)		Groningen

6 December 1986; 18:30	East Germany	23–7	United States	Emmen
6 December 1986; 18:30		(9–4)		Emmen

6 December 1986; 20:30	Netherlands	19–21	Hungary	Emmen
6 December 1986; 20:30		(6–11)		Emmen

7 December 1986; 14:00	East Germany	14–14	Hungary	Leeuwarden
7 December 1986; 14:00		(9–5)		Leeuwarden

7 December 1986; 16:00	Netherlands	18–17	United States	Leeuwarden
7 December 1986; 16:00		(12–8)		Leeuwarden

=== Group C ===
Team	Pld	W	D	L	GF	GA	GD	Pts
Norway	3	2	0	1	79	55	+24	4
Czechoslovakia	3	2	0	1	68	61	+7	4
China	3	1	1	1	57	66	−9	3
Japan	3	0	1	2	55	77	−22	1

4 December 1986; 18:30	China	20–19	Norway	Enschede
4 December 1986; 18:30		(12–14)		Enschede

4 December 1986; 20:30	Czechoslovakia	24–17	Japan	Enschede
4 December 1986; 20:30		(13–11)		Enschede

6 December 1986; 18:30	Norway	27–17	Czechoslovakia	Apeldoorn
6 December 1986; 18:30		(11–10)		Apeldoorn

6 December 1986; 20:30	China	20–20	Japan	Apeldoorn
6 December 1986; 20:30		(13–10)		Apeldoorn

7 December 1986; 14:00	Norway	33–18	Japan	Arnhem
7 December 1986; 14:00		(20–8)		Arnhem

7 December 1986; 16:00	Czechoslovakia	27–17	China	Arnhem
7 December 1986; 16:00		(14–8)		Arnhem

=== Group D ===
Team	Pld	W	D	L	GF	GA	GD	Pts
Romania	3	3	0	0	74	51	+23	6
West Germany	3	2	0	1	66	55	+11	4
South Korea	3	1	0	2	65	60	+5	2
France	3	0	0	3	36	75	−39	0

4 December 1986; 18:30	Romania	25–22	South Korea	Leeuwarden
4 December 1986; 18:30		(10–12)		Leeuwarden

4 December 1986; 20:30	West Germany	21–17	France	Leeuwarden
4 December 1986; 20:30		(11–10)		Leeuwarden

6 December 1986; 18:30	Romania	22–21	West Germany	Groningen
6 December 1986; 18:30		(10–9)		Groningen

6 December 1986; 20:30	South Korea	27–11	France	Groningen
6 December 1986; 20:30		(13–6)		Groningen

7 December 1986; 14:00	West Germany	24–16	South Korea	Emmen
7 December 1986; 14:00		(15–10)		Emmen

7 December 1986; 16:00	Romania	27–8	France	Emmen
7 December 1986; 16:00		(16–5)		Emmen

== Main round ==
Team will compete for Places 1–2
Team will compete for Places 3–4

=== Group E ===
Team	Pld	W	D	L	GF	GA	GD	Pts
Soviet Union	5	4	1	0	114	81	+33	9
East Germany	5	3	1	1	117	93	+24	7
Yugoslavia	5	3	1	1	99	89	+10	7
Hungary	5	2	1	2	93	90	+3	5
Netherlands	5	1	0	4	92	124	−32	2
Austria	5	0	0	5	85	123	−38	0

9 December 1986; 18:30	East Germany	25–20	Austria	Almere
9 December 1986; 18:30		(14–9)		Almere

9 December 1986; 18:30	Soviet Union	27–17	Netherlands	Den Haag
9 December 1986; 18:30		(17–6)		Den Haag

9 December 1986; 18:30	Yugoslavia	19–18	Hungary	Hoorn
9 December 1986; 18:30		(9–8)		Hoorn

10 December 1986; 20:30	East Germany	27–17	Yugoslavia	Apeldoorn
10 December 1986; 20:30		(14–7)		Apeldoorn

10 December 1986; 20:30	Soviet Union	19–18	Hungary	Delft
10 December 1986; 20:30		(8–7)		Delft

10 December 1986; 20:30	Netherlands	22–17	Austria	Amsterdam
10 December 1986; 20:30		(9–9)		Amsterdam

12 December 1986; 18:30	Soviet Union	24–17	East Germany	Den Haag
12 December 1986; 18:30		(14–5)		Den Haag

12 December 1986; 18:30	Hungary	22–19	Austria	Hoorn
12 December 1986; 18:30		(10–9)		Hoorn

12 December 1986; 20:30	Yugoslavia	25–16	Netherlands	Arnhem
12 December 1986; 20:30		(13–8)		Arnhem

=== Group F ===
Team	Pld	W	D	L	GF	GA	GD	Pts
Czechoslovakia	5	4	0	1	111	101	+10	8
Norway	5	3	1	1	117	90	+27	7
Romania	5	3	1	1	123	112	+11	7
West Germany	5	2	0	3	93	96	−3	4
China	5	1	1	3	100	118	−18	3
South Korea	5	0	1	4	96	123	−27	1

9 December 1986; 20:30	Czechoslovakia	19–13	West Germany	Almere
9 December 1986; 20:30		(8–5)		Almere

9 December 1986; 20:30	Norway	29–16	South Korea	Den Haag
9 December 1986; 20:30		(10–7)		Den Haag

9 December 1986; 20:30	Romania	32–24	China	Hoorn
9 December 1986; 20:30		(16–10)		Hoorn

10 December 1986; 18:30	Czechoslovakia	22–21	Romania	Amsterdam
10 December 1986; 18:30		(12–11)		Amsterdam

10 December 1986; 18:30	China	19–19	South Korea	Apeldoorn
10 December 1986; 18:30		(8–12)		Apeldoorn

10 December 1986; 18:30	Norway	19–14	West Germany	Delft
10 December 1986; 18:30		(9–8)		Delft

12 December 1986; 18:30	Norway	23–23	Romania	Arnhem
12 December 1986; 18:30		(10–11)		Arnhem

12 December 1986; 20:30	West Germany	21–20	China	Den Haag

12 December 1986; 20:30	Czechoslovakia	26–23	South Korea	Hoorn
12 December 1986; 20:30		(14–13)		Hoorn

=== Group G ===
Team	Pld	W	D	L	GF	GA	GD	Pts
Poland	3	3	0	0	59	47	+12	6
Japan	3	2	0	1	57	53	+4	4
France	3	1	0	2	53	46	+7	2
United States	3	0	0	3	45	68	−23	0

9 December 1986; 18:30	Poland	18–16	Japan	Veenendaal
9 December 1986; 18:30		(13–5)		Veenendaal

9 December 1986; 20:30	France	21–11	United States	Veenendaal

10 December 1986; 18:30	Poland	19–17	France	Schiedam
10 December 1986; 18:30		(10–7)		Schiedam

10 December 1986; 20:30	Japan	25–20	United States	Schiedam
10 December 1986; 20:30		(14–8)		Schiedam

11 December 1986; 18:30	Poland	22–14	United States	Breda
11 December 1986; 18:30		(11–8)		Breda

11 December 1986; 20:30	Japan	16–15	France	Breda
11 December 1986; 20:30		(9–7)		Breda

== Finals ==
=== Eleventh Place Playoff ===
13 December 1986
South Korea
31–30 (ET)
Austria
Utrecht

(13–12)

FT: 23–23 ET: 2–2, 6–5

=== Ninth Place Playoff ===
13 December 1986	China	22–17	Netherlands	Utrecht
13 December 1986		(10–11)		Utrecht

=== Seventh Place Playoff ===
13 December 1986	West Germany	18–17	Hungary	Utrecht
13 December 1986		(9–8)		Utrecht

=== Fifth Place Playoff ===
13 December 1986
Romania
28–26 (ET)
Yugoslavia
Utrecht

(10-13)

FT: 22–22 ET: 6–4

=== Third Place Playoff ===
14 December 1986	Norway	23–19	East Germany	Rotterdam
14 December 1986		(14–8)		Rotterdam

=== Final ===
14 December 1986	Soviet Union	30–22	Czechoslovakia	Rotterdam
14 December 1986	Kirtschik 14	(15–12)	Ďurišinová 9	Rotterdam

== Final standings ==
#	Team
Gold medal	Soviet Union
Silver medal	Czechoslovakia
Bronze medal	Norway
4	East Germany
5	Romania
6	Yugoslavia
7	West Germany
8	Hungary
9	China
10	Netherlands
11	South Korea
12	Austria
13	Poland
14	Japan
15	France
16	United States

Qualified for the 1988 Summer Olympics
