= 1973 World Women's Handball Championship =

1973 edition of the World Women's Handball Championship

Tournament details
- Host country: Yugoslavia
- Dates: 08 December to 15 December 1973

Final positions
- Champions: Yugoslavia (1st title)
- Runners-up: Romania
- Third place: Soviet Union

Tournament statistics
- Matches played: 34
- Goals scored: 748 (22 per match)
- Top scorer: (Socialist Federal Republic of Yugoslavia) Mara Torti (19 goals)

The 1973 World Women's Handball Championship was the 5th edition of the tournament. It took place in Yugoslavia between 7–15 December 1973.

== Preliminary round ==
First two teams will compete in main round. Last team is transferred to the classification round.

=== Group A ===
Team	Pld	W	D	L	GF	GA	GD	Pts
Hungary	2	2	0	0	30	14	+16	4
Czechoslovakia	2	1	0	1	23	21	+2	2
West Germany	2	0	0	2	16	34	−18	0

8 December 1973	Hungary	12–7	Czechoslovakia	Sarajevo

9 December 1973	Czechoslovakia	16–9	West Germany	Sarajevo

10 December 1973	Hungary	17–7	West Germany	Sarajevo

=== Group B ===
Team	Pld	W	D	L	GF	GA	GD	Pts
Romania	2	2	0	0	34	17	+17	4
Norway	2	1	0	1	21	19	+2	2
Japan	2	0	0	2	21	40	−19	0

8 December 1973	Romania	24–12	Japan	Zavidovici

9 December 1973	Norway	16–9	Japan	Zavidovici

10 December 1973	Romania	10–5	Norway	Zavidovici

=== Group C ===
Team	Pld	W	D	L	GF	GA	GD	Pts
Soviet Union	2	2	0	0	15	10	+5	4
Poland	2	0	1	1	17	19	−2	1
East Germany	2	0	1	1	15	18	−3	1

8 December 1973	Soviet Union	7–4	East Germany	Šibenik

9 December 1973	Poland	11–11	East Germany	Šibenik

10 December 1973	Soviet Union	8–6	Poland	Šibenik

=== Group D ===
Team	Pld	W	D	L	GF	GA	GD	Pts
Yugoslavia	2	2	0	0	31	14	+17	4
Denmark	2	1	0	1	23	15	+8	2
Netherlands	2	0	0	2	8	33	−25	0

8 December 1973	Yugoslavia	20–4	Netherlands	Varaždin

9 December 1973	Denmark	13–4	Netherlands	Varaždin

10 December 1973	Yugoslavia	11–10	Denmark	Varaždin

== Main round ==
Team will compete for Places 1-2
Team will compete for Places 3-4

=== Group I ===
Team	Pld	W	D	L	GF	GA	GD	Pts
Romania	3	3	0	0	32	24	+8	6
Hungary	3	2	0	1	37	22	+15	4
Czechoslovakia	3	1	0	2	27	30	−3	2
Norway	3	0	0	3	16	36	−20	0

12 December 1973	Romania	10–8	Czechoslovakia	Yugoslavia

12 December 1973	Hungary	14–3	Norway	Yugoslavia

13 December 1973	Romania	12–11	Hungary	Yugoslavia

13 December 1973	Czechoslovakia	12–8	Norway	Yugoslavia

=== Group II ===
Team	Pld	W	D	L	GF	GA	GD	Pts
Yugoslavia	3	2	0	1	26	24	+2	4
Soviet Union	3	1	1	1	23	23	0	3
Poland	3	1	1	1	27	28	−1	3
Denmark	3	0	2	1	32	33	−1	2

12 December 1973	Yugoslavia	8–9	Poland	Yugoslavia

12 December 1973	Soviet Union	10–10	Denmark	Yugoslavia

13 December 1973	Yugoslavia	7–5	Soviet Union	Yugoslavia

13 December 1973	Denmark	12–12	Poland	Yugoslavia

== Classification round ==
Team	Pld	W	D	L	GF	GA	GD	Pts
East Germany	3	3	0	0	46	26	+20	6
Japan	3	2	0	1	40	38	+2	4
West Germany	3	1	0	2	33	32	+1	2
Netherlands	3	0	0	3	25	48	−23	0

12 December 1973	East Germany	14–5	West Germany	Yugoslavia

12 December 1973	Japan	15–11	Netherlands	Yugoslavia

13 December 1973	East Germany	17–12	Japan	Yugoslavia

13 December 1973	West Germany	18–5	Netherlands	Yugoslavia

15 December 1973	East Germany	15–9	Netherlands	Yugoslavia

15 December 1973	West Germany	10–13	Japan	Yugoslavia

== Placement round ==
=== Seventh Place playoff ===
15 December 1973	Denmark	12–10	Norway	Yugoslavia

=== Fifth Place Playoff ===
15 December 1973	Poland	15–13	Czechoslovakia	Yugoslavia

=== Third Place playoff ===
15 December 1973	Soviet Union	20–12	Hungary	Yugoslavia

=== Final ===
15 December 1973	Yugoslavia	16–11	Romania	Yugoslavia

== Final standings ==
Rank	Team
Gold medal	Yugoslavia
Silver medal	Romania
Bronze medal	Soviet Union
4	Hungary
5	Poland
6	Czechoslovakia
7	Denmark
8	Norway
9	East Germany
10	Japan
11	West Germany
12	Netherlands
