= Czechoslovakia women's national handball team =

The Czechoslovakia women's national handball team was the national handball team of former Czechoslovakia. The team won the inaugural World Women's Handball Championship in 1957. Their last tournament was the 1993 World Women's Handball Championship, where they played as one team even though the countries had already split up in 1992.

== Olympic Games history ==
- 1980 : 5th place
- 1988 : 5th place

== World Championship history ==
- 1957 : Champions
- 1962 : 3rd place
- 1965 : 4th place
- 1973 : 6th place
- 1975 : 6th place
- 1978 : 4th place
- 1982 : 5th place
- 1986 : 2nd place
