= 1982 World Women's Handball Championship =

1982 edition of the World Women's Handball Championship

Tournament details
- Host country: Hungarian People's Republic
- Dates: 2 December - 12 December

Final positions
- Champions: Soviet Union (1st title)
- Runners-up: Hungary
- Third place: Yugoslavia

Tournament statistics
- Matches played: 42
- Goals scored: 1,608 (38.29 per match)
- Top scorer: (Socialist Federal Republic of Yugoslavia) Jasna Kolar-Merdan (52 goals)

The 1982 World Women's Handball Championship was the 8th edition of the tournament. It took place in Hungary between 2-12 December 1982.

== Qualification ==
Host nation

- Hungary

Qualified from the 1980 Summer Olympics

- East Germany
- Soviet Union
- Yugoslavia

Qualified from the 1981 World Championship B

- Bulgaria
- Czechoslovakia
- Norway
- Romania
- West Germany

Qualified from the 1981 African Women's Handball Championship

- Congo

Qualified from Asia

- South Korea

Qualified from the Americas

- United States

== Preliminary round ==
=== Group A ===
Team	Pld	W	D	L	GF	GA	GD	Pts
Hungary	3	2	1	0	63	39	+24	5
East Germany	3	2	1	0	59	35	+24	5
Norway	3	1	0	2	57	53	+4	2
United States	3	0	0	3	21	73	−52	0

Source: IHF, Todor66

2 December 1982	East Germany	16–14	Norway	Budapest
2 December 1982		(8–6)		Budapest

2 December 1982	Hungary	22–4	United States	Budapest
2 December 1982		(15–1)		Budapest

3 December 1982; 18:30	East Germany	26–4	United States	Budapest
3 December 1982; 18:30		(10–4)		Budapest

3 December 1982; 20:00	Hungary	24–18	Norway	Budapest
3 December 1982; 20:00		(5–9)		Budapest

5 December 1982; 18:30	Norway	25–13	United States	Budapest
5 December 1982; 18:30		(11–5)		Budapest

5 December 1982; 20:00	Hungary	17–17	East Germany	Budapest
5 December 1982; 20:00		(8–7)		Budapest

=== Group B ===
Team	Pld	W	D	L	GF	GA	GD	Pts
Soviet Union	3	3	0	0	65	49	+16	6
South Korea	3	1	1	1	69	68	+1	3
Romania	3	1	1	1	56	59	−3	3
Bulgaria	3	0	0	3	52	66	−14	0

Source: IHF, Todor66

2 December 1982	Soviet Union	22–12	Bulgaria	Miskoltz
2 December 1982		(13–5)		Miskoltz

2 December 1982	South Korea	22–22	Romania	Miskoltz
2 December 1982		(11–10)		Miskoltz

3 December 1982; 17:00	Soviet Union	23–21	South Korea	Debrecen
3 December 1982; 17:00		(10–10)		Debrecen

3 December 1982; 18:30	Romania	18–17	Bulgaria	Debrecen
3 December 1982; 18:30		(6–9)		Debrecen

5 December 1982; 15:00	Soviet Union	20–16	Romania	Miskoltz
5 December 1982; 15:00		(10–5)		Miskoltz

5 December 1982; 16:30	South Korea	26–23	Bulgaria	Miskoltz
5 December 1982; 16:30		(14–11)		Miskoltz

=== Group C ===
Team	Pld	W	D	L	GF	GA	GD	Pts
Yugoslavia	3	3	0	0	80	43	+37	6
Czechoslovakia	3	2	0	1	64	52	+12	4
West Germany	3	1	0	2	65	49	+16	2
Congo	3	0	0	3	34	99	−65	0

Source: IHF, Todor66

2 December 1982	Yugoslavia	21–16	West Germany	Miskoltz
2 December 1982		(12–8)		Miskoltz

2 December 1982	Czechoslovakia	30–13	Congo	Miskoltz
2 December 1982		(11–5)		Miskoltz

3 December 1982; 17:00	Yugoslavia	37–11	Congo	Pécs
3 December 1982; 17:00		(17–4)		Pécs

3 December 1982; 18:30	Czechoslovakia	18–17	West Germany	Pécs
3 December 1982; 18:30		(10–10)		Pécs

5 December 1982; 15:00	West Germany	32–10	Congo	Miskoltz
5 December 1982; 15:00		(13–4)		Miskoltz

5 December 1982; 16:30	Yugoslavia	22–16	Czechoslovakia	Miskoltz
5 December 1982; 16:30		(11–7)		Miskoltz

== Final round ==
=== Group 7-12 ===
Team	Pld	W	D	L	GF	GA	GD	Pts
Norway	5	4	1	0	109	77	+32	9
Romania	5	3	2	0	121	80	+41	8
West Germany	5	3	1	1	110	75	+35	7
Bulgaria	5	2	0	3	101	93	+8	4
United States	5	1	0	4	76	121	−45	2
Congo	5	0	0	5	74	145	−71	0

Source: IHF, Todor66

7 December 1982	Norway	28–14	Congo	Szolnok
7 December 1982		(13–7)		Szolnok

7 December 1982	Romania	34–15	United States
7 December 1982		(18–9)

7 December 1982	West Germany	18–15	Bulgaria
7 December 1982		(9–8)

8 December 1982; 17:00	Norway	22–19	Bulgaria	Eger
8 December 1982; 17:00		(10–7)		Eger

8 December 1982; 18:30	Romania	18–18	West Germany	Eger
8 December 1982; 18:30		(9–7)		Eger

8 December 1982; 18:30	United States	19–16	Congo	Győr
8 December 1982; 18:30		(9–7)		Győr

10 December 1982	Norway	18–15	West Germany	Veszprem
10 December 1982		(10–6)		Veszprem

10 December 1982	Romania	35–14	Congo
10 December 1982		(16–7)

10 December 1982	Bulgaria	19–15	United States
10 December 1982		(14–8)

11 December 1982	Norway	16–16	Romania	Budapest
11 December 1982		(8–8)		Budapest

11 December 1982	West Germany	27–14	United States
11 December 1982		(14–8)

11 December 1982	Bulgaria	31–20	Congo
11 December 1982		(13–9)

=== Final Group ===
Team	Pld	W	D	L	GF	GA	GD	Pts
Soviet Union	5	4	0	1	86	81	+5	8
Hungary	5	3	1	1	99	89	+10	7
Yugoslavia	5	3	1	1	102	95	+7	7
East Germany	5	2	2	1	99	89	+10	6
Czechoslovakia	5	1	0	4	83	98	−15	2
South Korea	5	0	0	5	112	129	−17	0

Source: IHF, Todor66

7 December 1982; 17:00	Soviet Union	15–14	East Germany	Budapest
7 December 1982; 17:00		(6–8)		Budapest

7 December 1982; 18:30	Yugoslavia	27–25	South Korea	Budapest
7 December 1982; 18:30		(16–15)		Budapest

7 December 1982; 20:00	Hungary	20–17	Czechoslovakia	Budapest
7 December 1982; 20:00		(11–7)		Budapest

8 December 1982; 17:00	East Germany	23–18	Czechoslovakia	Budapest
8 December 1982; 17:00		(14–7)		Budapest

8 December 1982; 18:30	Soviet Union	21–19	Yugoslavia	Budapest
8 December 1982; 18:30		(10–8)		Budapest

8 December 1982; 20:00	Hungary	31–25	South Korea	Budapest
8 December 1982; 20:00		(18–12)		Budapest

10 December 1982; 17:00	East Germany	28–22	South Korea	Budapest
10 December 1982; 17:00		(14–12)		Budapest

10 December 1982; 18:30	Soviet Union	14–12	Czechoslovakia	Budapest
10 December 1982; 18:30		(9–6)		Budapest

10 December 1982; 20:00	Hungary	16–17	Yugoslavia	Budapest
10 December 1982; 20:00		(9–10)		Budapest

12 December 1982; 14:30	Yugoslavia	17–17	East Germany	Budapest
12 December 1982; 14:30		(5-9)		Budapest

12 December 1982; 16:00	Czechoslovakia	20–19	South Korea	Budapest
12 December 1982; 16:00		(13–8)		Budapest

12 December 1982; 17:30	Hungary	15–13	Soviet Union	Budapest
12 December 1982; 17:30		(6–6)		Budapest

== Final standings ==
#	Team
Gold medal	Soviet Union
Silver medal	Hungary
Bronze medal	Yugoslavia
4	East Germany
5	Czechoslovakia
6	South Korea
7	Norway
8	Romania
9	West Germany
10	Bulgaria
11	United States
12	Congo

Qualified for the 1984 Summer Olympics
