= 1978 World Women's Handball Championship =

1978 edition of the World Women's Handball Championship

Tournament details
- Host country: Czechoslovakia
- Venues: 4 (in 4 host cities)
- Dates: 30 November–10 December
- Teams: 12 (from 4 confederations)

Final positions
- Champions: East Germany (3rd title)
- Runners-up: Soviet Union
- Third place: Hungary

Tournament statistics
- Matches played: 33
- Goals scored: 1,007 (30.52 per match)
- Top scorers: (Czech Republic) Milena Foltynova (East Germany) Kristina Richter (41 goals)

The 1978 World Women's Handball Championship was the 7th edition of the tournament. It took place in Czechoslovakia from between 30 November-10 December 1978. East Germany won the tournament ahead of Soviet Union and Hungary. This was East Germany's second title in a row and third overall.

== Qualification ==
Host nation

- Czechoslovakia

Qualified from the 1976 Summer Olympics

- East Germany
- Hungary
- Soviet Union

Qualified from the 1977 World Championship B

- Netherlands
- Poland
- Romania
- West Germany
- Yugoslavia

Qualified from the 1978 All-African Games

- Algeria

Qualified from Asia

- South Korea

Qualified from the Americas

- Canada

== Preliminary round ==
=== Group A ===
Team	Pld	W	D	L	GF	GA	GD	Pts
East Germany	3	3	0	0	57	35	+22	6
Yugoslavia	3	2	0	1	58	50	+8	4
Romania	3	1	0	2	43	41	+2	2
South Korea	3	0	0	3	45	77	−32	0

Source: IHF, Todor66, Frauenhandball

30 November 1978; 17:00	Yugoslavia	28–21	South Korea	Gottwaldow
30 November 1978; 17:00		(14–10)		Gottwaldow

30 November 1978; 18:30	East Germany	13–9	Romania	Gottwaldow
30 November 1978; 18:30		(7–6)		Gottwaldow

1 December 1978; 17:00	Yugoslavia	16–14	Romania	Gottwaldow
1 December 1978; 17:00		(8–7)		Gottwaldow

1 December 1978; 18:30	East Germany	29–12	South Korea	Gottwaldow
1 December 1978; 18:30		(12–6)		Gottwaldow

2 December 1978; 15:00	Romania	20–12	South Korea	Gottwaldow
2 December 1978; 15:00		(11–6)		Gottwaldow

2 December 1978; 17:15	East Germany	15–14	Yugoslavia	Gottwaldow
2 December 1978; 17:15		(7–7)		Gottwaldow

=== Group B ===
Team	Pld	W	D	L	GF	GA	GD	Pts
Czechoslovakia	3	3	0	0	62	28	+34	6
Soviet Union	3	2	0	1	61	28	+33	4
Netherlands	3	1	0	2	51	52	−1	2
Algeria	3	0	0	3	14	80	−66	0

Source: IHF, Todor66, Frauenhandball

30 November 1978; 17:00	Czechoslovakia	31–5	Algeria	Trnava
30 November 1978; 17:00		(19–1)		Trnava

30 November 1978; 18:30	Soviet Union	26–12	Netherlands	Trnava
30 November 1978; 18:30		(15–7)		Trnava

1 December 1978; 17:00	Czechoslovakia	20–13	Netherlands	Trnava
1 December 1978; 17:00		(12–4)		Trnava

1 December 1978; 18:30	Soviet Union	23–5	Algeria	Trnava
1 December 1978; 18:30		(13–1)		Trnava

2 December 1978; 15:30	Netherlands	26–4	Algeria	Trnava
2 December 1978; 15:30		(13–0)		Trnava

2 December 1978; 17:15	Czechoslovakia	11–10	Soviet Union	Trnava
2 December 1978; 17:15		(5–5)		Trnava

=== Group C ===
Team	Pld	W	D	L	GF	GA	GD	Pts
Hungary	3	3	0	0	70	39	+31	6
Poland	3	2	0	1	58	52	+6	4
West Germany	3	1	0	2	50	45	+5	2
Canada	3	0	0	3	32	74	−42	0

Source: IHF, Todor66, Frauenhandball

30 November 1978; 17:00	Poland	28–16	Canada	Cheb
30 November 1978; 17:00		(14–4)		Cheb

30 November 1978; 18:30	Hungary	23–15	West Germany	Cheb
30 November 1978; 18:30		(10–5)		Cheb

1 December 1978; 17:00	Poland	16–15	West Germany	Cheb
1 December 1978; 17:00		(5–8)		Cheb

1 December 1978; 18:30	Hungary	26–10	Canada	Cheb
1 December 1978; 18:30		(15–6)		Cheb

2 December 1978; 15:30	West Germany	20–6	Canada	Cheb
2 December 1978; 15:30		(10–2)		Cheb

2 December 1978; 17:15	Hungary	21–14	Poland	Cheb
2 December 1978; 17:15		(12–9)		Cheb

== Final round ==
=== Group 7-9 ===
Team	Pld	W	D	L	GF	GA	GD	Pts
Romania	2	2	0	0	35	26	+9	4
West Germany	2	1	0	1	27	27	0	2
Netherlands	2	0	0	2	36	45	−9	0

Source: IHF, Todor66, Frauenhandball

5 December 1978	Romania	10–7	West Germany	Bratislava
5 December 1978		(6–3)		Bratislava

6 December 1978; 14:30	West Germany	20–17	Netherlands	Bratislava
6 December 1978; 14:30		(13–8)		Bratislava

7 December 1978	Romania	25–19	Netherlands	Bratislava
7 December 1978		(14–8)		Bratislava

=== Final Group ===
Team	Pld	W	D	L	GF	GA	GD	Pts
East Germany	5	4	0	1	82	55	+27	8
Soviet Union	5	4	0	1	75	52	+23	8
Hungary	5	3	0	2	67	73	−6	6
Czechoslovakia	5	2	1	2	72	60	+12	5
Yugoslavia	5	1	1	3	68	71	−3	3
Poland	5	0	0	5	50	103	−53	0

Source: IHF, Todor66, Frauenhandball

5 December 1978; 15:30	East Germany	25–10	Poland
5 December 1978; 15:30		(11–4)

5 December 1978; 18:30	Czechoslovakia	13–13	Yugoslavia
5 December 1978; 18:30		(8–7)

5 December 1978; 20:00	Soviet Union	19–13	Hungary
5 December 1978; 20:00		(9–5)

6 December 1978; 16:00	Yugoslavia	18–14	Poland
6 December 1978; 16:00		(8–4)

6 December 1978; 18:30	Hungary	14–13	Czechoslovakia
6 December 1978; 18:30		(9–5)

6 December 1978; 20:00	Soviet Union	14–12	East Germany
6 December 1978; 20:00		(10–5)

8 December 1978; 16:00	East Germany	14–5	Hungary
8 December 1978; 16:00		(7–2)

8 December 1978; 18:30	Czechoslovakia	22–7	Poland
8 December 1978; 18:30		(10–4)

8 December 1978; 20:00	Soviet Union	15–11	Yugoslavia
8 December 1978; 20:00		(10–5)

10 December 1978; 10:30	Hungary	14–12	Yugoslavia
10 December 1978; 10:30		(8–7)

10 December 1978; 15:00	Soviet Union	17–5	Poland
10 December 1978; 15:00		(7–1)

10 December 1978; 16:30	East Germany	16–12	Czechoslovakia
10 December 1978; 16:30		(8–5)

== Final standings ==
#	Team
Gold medal	East Germany
Silver medal	Soviet Union
Bronze medal	Hungary
4	Czechoslovakia
5	Yugoslavia
6	Poland
7	Romania
8	West Germany
9	Netherlands
10-12	South Korea
10-12	Canada
10-12	Algeria

Qualified for the 1980 Summer Olympics
