= 2019 World Women's Handball Championship =

2019 edition of the World Women's Handball Championship

Tournament details
- Host country: Japan
- Venues: 5 (in 3 host cities)
- Dates: 30 November – 15 December
- Teams: 24 (from 6 confederations)

Final positions
- Champions: Netherlands (1st title)
- Runners-up: Spain
- Third place: Russia
- Fourth place: Norway

Tournament statistics
- Matches played: 96
- Goals scored: 5,179 (53.95 per match)
- Attendance: 315,748 (3,289 per match)
- Top scorer(s): (Netherlands) Lois Abbingh (71 goals)

Awards
- Best player: (Netherlands) Estavana Polman

The 2019 IHF World Women's Handball Championship, the 24th event hosted by the International Handball Federation, was held in Japan from 30 November to 15 December 2019.

The Netherlands won their first title after defeating Spain in the final. The final was decided on a controversial penalty decision, when Ainhoa Hernandez blocked the Dutch goalkeeper's pass stopping a potential counter with seconds to go.

== Venues ==
Kumamoto region was entrusted with the organization of the World Championship. Additionally the Japanese Organizing Committee will have a venue in Tokyo in order to prepare for the 2020 Olympic Games. Kumamoto has had a lot of experience with handball tournaments, hosting the 1997 Men's World Championships.

Higashi-ku	Minami-ku	Nishi-ku
Park Dome Kumamoto; Capacity: 10,000	Aqua Dome Kumamoto; Capacity: 6,400	Kumamoto Prefectural Gymnasium; Capacity: 3,400
Yatsushiro		Yamaga
Yatsushiro General Gymnasium; Capacity: 2,500		Yamaga City Overall Gymnasium; Capacity: 2,100

== Qualification ==
Competition	Dates	Host	Vacancies	Qualified
Host nation	28 October 2013	(Qatar) Doha	1	Japan
2017 World Championship	1–17 December 2017	Germany	1	France
2018 South and Central American Championship	29 November – 4 December 2018	(Brazil) Maceió	2	Argentina; Brazil
2018 European Championship	29 November – 16 December 2018	France	3	Netherlands; Romania; Russia
2018 Asian Championship	30 November – 9 December 2018	Japan	4^{[1]}	Australia; China; Kazakhstan; South Korea
2018 African Championship	2–12 December 2018	(Republic of the Congo) Brazzaville	3	Angola; DR Congo; Senegal
2019 Nor.Ca. Championship	28 May – 2 June 2019	Mexico City	1	Cuba
European qualification	23 November 2018 – 6 June 2019	Various	9	Denmark; Germany; Hungary; Montenegro; Norway; Serbia; Slovenia; Spain; Sweden

1. If countries from Oceania (Australia or New Zealand) participating in the Asian Championships finished within the top 5, they qualified for the World Championships. If they placed sixth or lower, the place would have been transferred to the wild card spot.

== Qualified teams ==
Country	Qualified as	Qualification date	Previous appearances in tournament (Note: Bold indicates champion for that year, Italics indicates host for that year.)
Japan	Host	28 October 2013	18 (1962, 1965, 1971, 1973, 1975, 1986, 1995, 1997, 1999, 2001, 2003, 2005, 2007, 2009, 2011, 2013, 2015, 2017)
France	Defending World Champion	17 December 2017	13 (1986, 1990, 1997, 1999, 2001, **2003**, 2005, 2007, 2009, 2011, 2013, 2015, **2017**)
Brazil	Top two at the 2018 South and Central American Championship	3 December 2018	12 (1995, 1997, 1999, 2001, 2003, 2005, 2007, 2009, 2011, **2013**, 2015, 2017)
Argentina	Top two at the 2018 South and Central American Championship	3 December 2018	9 (1999, 2003, 2005, 2007, 2009, 2011, 2013, 2015, 2017)
China	Semifinalist of 2018 Asian Championship	4 December 2018	15 (1986, 1990, 1993, 1995, 1997, 1999, 2001, 2003, 2005, 2007, 2009, 2011, 2013, 2015, 2017)
Kazakhstan	Semifinalist of 2018 Asian Championship	4 December 2018	4 (2007, 2009, 2011, 2015)
South Korea	Semifinalist of 2018 Asian Championship	4 December 2018	17 (1978, 1982, 1986, 1990, 1993, **1995**, 1997, 1999, 2001, 2003, 2005, 2007, 2009, 2011, 2013, 2015, 2017)
Australia	Fifth place of 2018 Asian Championship	8 December 2018	7 (1999, 2003, 2005, 2007, 2009, 2011, 2013)
Senegal	Finalist of 2018 African Championship	10 December 2018	0 (Debut)
Angola	Finalist of 2018 African Championship	10 December 2018	14 (1990, 1993, 1995, 1997, 1999, 2001, 2003, 2005, 2007, 2009, 2011, 2013, 2015, 2017)
DR Congo	Third place of 2018 African Championship	12 December 2018	2 (2013, 2015)
Netherlands	Semifinalist of 2018 European Championship	12 December 2018	11 (1971, 1973, 1978, 1986, 1999, 2001, 2005, 2011, 2013, 2015, 2017)
Romania	Semifinalist of 2018 European Championship	12 December 2018	23 (1957, **1962**, 1965, 1971, 1973, 1975, 1978, 1982, 1986, 1990, 1993, 1995, 1997, 1999, 2001, 2003, 2005, 2007, 2009, 2011, 2013, 2015, 2017)
Russia	Semifinalist of 2018 European Championship	12 December 2018	12 (1993, 1995, 1997, 1999, **2001**, 2003, **2005**, **2007**, **2009**, 2011, 2015, 2017)
Cuba	2019 Nor.Ca. Champion	2 June 2019	3 (1999, 2011, 2015)
Hungary	European playoff winner	5 June 2019	21 (1957, 1962, **1965**, 1971, 1973, 1975, 1978, 1982, 1986, 1993, 1995, 1997, 1999, 2001, 2003, 2005, 2007, 2009, 2013, 2015, 2017)
Denmark	European playoff winner	5 June 2019	19 (1957, 1962, 1965, 1971, 1973, 1975, 1990, 1993, 1995, **1997**, 1999, 2001, 2003, 2005, 2009, 2011, 2013, 2015, 2017)
Germany	European playoff winner	5 June 2019	11 (**1993**, 1995, 1997, 1999, 2003, 2005, 2007, 2009, 2011, 2013, 2015, 2017)
Norway	European playoff winner	5 June 2019	19 (1971, 1973, 1975, 1982, 1986, 1990, 1993, 1995, 1997, **1999**, 2001, 2003, 2005, 2007, 2009, **2011**, 2013, **2015**, 2017)
Montenegro	European playoff winner	5 June 2019	4 (2011, 2013, 2015, 2017)
Sweden	European playoff winner	6 June 2019	9 (1957, 1990, 1993, 1995, 2001, 2009, 2011, 2015, 2017)
Serbia	European playoff winner	6 June 2019	3 (2013, 2015, 2017)
Slovenia	European playoff winner	6 June 2019	5 (1997, 2001, 2003, 2005, 2017)
Spain	European playoff winner	6 June 2019	9 (1993, 2001, 2003, 2007, 2009, 2011, 2013, 2015, 2017)

== Draw ==
The draw was held on 21 June 2019 in Tokyo, Japan.

=== Seeding ===
The seeding was announced on 19 June 2019. As organizer, Japan had the right to choose their group.

Pot 1	Pot 2	Pot 3	Pot 4	Pot 5	Pot 6
France; Russia; Netherlands; Romania	Norway; Sweden; Hungary; Denmark	Montenegro; Japan; Germany; Serbia	Spain; Slovenia; South Korea; China	Brazil; Angola; Senegal; Argentina	Kazakhstan; Cuba; DR Congo; Australia

== Referees ==
17 referee pairs were selected.

Referees
Algeria	Yousef Belkhiri; Sid Ali Hamidi
Argentina	María Paolantoni; Mariana García
China	Cheng Yufeng; Zhou Yunlei
Croatia	Davor Lončar; Zoran Lončar
Denmark	Karina Christiansen; Line Hansen
Egypt	Yasmina El-Saied; Heidy El-Saied
France	Charlotte Bonaventura; Julie Bonaventura
Germany	Maike Merz; Tanja Schilha
Japan	Koyoshi Hizaki; Tomokazu Ikebuchi

Referees
Romania	Cristina Năstase; Simona Stancu
Russia	Viktoria Alpaidze; Tatiana Berezkina
Slovenia	Bojan Lah; David Sok
Serbia	Vanja Antić; Jelena Jakovljević
South Korea	Koo Bon-ok; Lee Se-ok
Spain	Ignacio García; Andreu Marín
Tunisia	Samir Krichen; Samir Makhlouf
Uruguay	Mathias Sosa; Cristian Lemes

== Squads ==
Each team consisted of up to 28 players, of whom 16 may be fielded for each match.

== Preliminary round ==
The schedule was announced on 3 July 2019.

=== Tiebreakers ===
In the group stage, teams were ranked according to points (2 points for a win, 1 point for a draw, 0 points for a loss). After completion of the group stage, if two or more teams had scored the same number of points, the ranking was determined as follows:

1. Highest number of points in matches between the teams directly involved;
2. Superior goal difference in matches between the teams directly involved;
3. Highest number of goals scored in matches between the teams directly involved (or in the away match in case of a two-team tie);
4. Superior goal difference in all matches of the group;
5. Highest number of plus goals in all matches of the group;

If the ranking of one of these teams is determined, the above criteria are consecutively followed until the ranking of all teams is determined. If no ranking can be determined, a decision shall be obtained by IHF through drawing of lots.

During the group stage, only criteria 4–5 applied to determine the provisional ranking of teams.

All times are local (UTC+9).

=== Group A ===
Pos	Team	Pld	W	D	L	GF	GA	GD	Pts	Qualification
1	Netherlands	5	4	0	1	178	134	+44	8 (Note: Netherlands 30–28 Norway)	Main round
2	Norway	5	4	0	1	169	115	+54	8	Main round
3	Serbia	5	3	0	2	155	143	+12	6	Main round
4	Angola	5	2	0	3	150	151	−1	4 (Note: Slovenia 24–33 Angola)	
5	Slovenia	5	2	0	3	142	150	−8	4	
6	Cuba	5	0	0	5	122	223	−101	0	

Source: IHF
Rules for classification: 1) points; 2) head-to-head points; 3) head-to-head goal difference; 4) head-to-head number of goals scored; 5) goal difference.
Notes:

30 November 2019; 15:00	Serbia	32–25	Angola	Aqua Dome Kumamoto, Minami-ku; Attendance: 3,605; Referees: García, Paolantoni (ARG)
30 November 2019; 15:00	Nikolić 7	(16–12)	Guialo 5	Aqua Dome Kumamoto, Minami-ku; Attendance: 3,605; Referees: García, Paolantoni (ARG)
30 November 2019; 15:00	2× (yellow card) 4× (suspension)	Report	1× (yellow card) 4× (suspension)	Aqua Dome Kumamoto, Minami-ku; Attendance: 3,605; Referees: García, Paolantoni (ARG)

30 November 2019; 18:00	Netherlands	26–32	Slovenia	Aqua Dome Kumamoto, Minami-ku; Attendance: 2,864; Referees: Krichen, Makhlouf (TUN)
30 November 2019; 18:00	Abbingh, Polman 5	(14–15)	Stanko 12	Aqua Dome Kumamoto, Minami-ku; Attendance: 2,864; Referees: Krichen, Makhlouf (TUN)
30 November 2019; 18:00	1× (yellow card) 3× (suspension)	Report	1× (yellow card) 4× (suspension)	Aqua Dome Kumamoto, Minami-ku; Attendance: 2,864; Referees: Krichen, Makhlouf (TUN)

30 November 2019; 20:30	Norway	47–16	Cuba	Aqua Dome Kumamoto, Minami-ku; Attendance: 1,871; Referees: El-Saied, El-Saied (EGY)
30 November 2019; 20:30	Herrem, Løke 8	(25–9)	Céspedes, Lusson 3	Aqua Dome Kumamoto, Minami-ku; Attendance: 1,871; Referees: El-Saied, El-Saied (EGY)
30 November 2019; 20:30	3× (suspension)	Report	1× (suspension)	Aqua Dome Kumamoto, Minami-ku; Attendance: 1,871; Referees: El-Saied, El-Saied (EGY)

2 December 2019; 12:30	Cuba	27–46	Serbia	Aqua Dome Kumamoto, Minami-ku; Attendance: 5,570; Referees: Krichen, Makhlouf (TUN)
2 December 2019; 12:30	Rizo 6	(11–25)	three players 6	Aqua Dome Kumamoto, Minami-ku; Attendance: 5,570; Referees: Krichen, Makhlouf (TUN)
2 December 2019; 12:30	5× (suspension)	Report	1× (yellow card) 4× (suspension)	Aqua Dome Kumamoto, Minami-ku; Attendance: 5,570; Referees: Krichen, Makhlouf (TUN)

2 December 2019; 15:00	Angola	28–35	Netherlands	Aqua Dome Kumamoto, Minami-ku; Attendance: 4,690; Referees: Belkhiri, Hamidi (ALG)
2 December 2019; 15:00	Carlos 9	(12–17)	Abbingh 11	Aqua Dome Kumamoto, Minami-ku; Attendance: 4,690; Referees: Belkhiri, Hamidi (ALG)
2 December 2019; 15:00	1× (yellow card) 5× (suspension)	Report	2× (yellow card) 5× (suspension)	Aqua Dome Kumamoto, Minami-ku; Attendance: 4,690; Referees: Belkhiri, Hamidi (ALG)

2 December 2019; 20:30	Slovenia	20–36	Norway	Aqua Dome Kumamoto, Minami-ku; Attendance: 1,680; Referees: Bonaventura, Bonaventura (FRA)
2 December 2019; 20:30	Gros 9	(12–13)	Røsberg Jacobsen 8	Aqua Dome Kumamoto, Minami-ku; Attendance: 1,680; Referees: Bonaventura, Bonaventura (FRA)
2 December 2019; 20:30	3× (suspension)	Report	3× (suspension)	Aqua Dome Kumamoto, Minami-ku; Attendance: 1,680; Referees: Bonaventura, Bonaventura (FRA)

3 December 2019; 15:00	Netherlands	51–23	Cuba	Aqua Dome Kumamoto, Minami-ku; Attendance: 5,060; Referees: García, Paolantoni (ARG)
3 December 2019; 15:00	Malestein 11	(22–11)	Céspedes 4	Aqua Dome Kumamoto, Minami-ku; Attendance: 5,060; Referees: García, Paolantoni (ARG)
3 December 2019; 15:00	1× (yellow card) 5× (suspension)	Report	6× (suspension)	Aqua Dome Kumamoto, Minami-ku; Attendance: 5,060; Referees: García, Paolantoni (ARG)

3 December 2019; 18:00	Slovenia	24–33	Angola	Aqua Dome Kumamoto, Minami-ku; Attendance: 2,280; Referees: Koo, Lee (KOR)
3 December 2019; 18:00	Stanko 9	(12–16)	Carlos, Kassoma 6	Aqua Dome Kumamoto, Minami-ku; Attendance: 2,280; Referees: Koo, Lee (KOR)
3 December 2019; 18:00	2× (yellow card) 3× (suspension)	Report	5× (suspension)	Aqua Dome Kumamoto, Minami-ku; Attendance: 2,280; Referees: Koo, Lee (KOR)

3 December 2019; 20:30	Norway	28–25	Serbia	Aqua Dome Kumamoto, Minami-ku; Attendance: 1,970; Referees: Kuttler, Merz (GER)
3 December 2019; 20:30	Hegh Arntzen, Oftedal 7	(13–12)	Liščević 6	Aqua Dome Kumamoto, Minami-ku; Attendance: 1,970; Referees: Kuttler, Merz (GER)
3 December 2019; 20:30	3× (yellow card) 4× (suspension)	Report	1× (yellow card) 8× (suspension) 1× (red card)	Aqua Dome Kumamoto, Minami-ku; Attendance: 1,970; Referees: Kuttler, Merz (GER)

5 December 2019; 15:00	Cuba	26–39	Slovenia	Aqua Dome Kumamoto, Minami-ku; Attendance: 5,520; Referees: Năstase, Stancu (ROU)
5 December 2019; 15:00	Rizo 7	(15–17)	Stanko 11	Aqua Dome Kumamoto, Minami-ku; Attendance: 5,520; Referees: Năstase, Stancu (ROU)
5 December 2019; 15:00	2× (yellow card) 2× (suspension)	Report	3× (yellow card) 5× (suspension)	Aqua Dome Kumamoto, Minami-ku; Attendance: 5,520; Referees: Năstase, Stancu (ROU)

5 December 2019; 18:00	Serbia	23–36	Netherlands	Aqua Dome Kumamoto, Minami-ku; Attendance: 2,460; Referees: Bonaventura, Bonaventura (FRA)
5 December 2019; 18:00	three players 6	(12–20)	Polman 8	Aqua Dome Kumamoto, Minami-ku; Attendance: 2,460; Referees: Bonaventura, Bonaventura (FRA)
5 December 2019; 18:00	4× (suspension)	Report	2× (yellow card) 4× (suspension)	Aqua Dome Kumamoto, Minami-ku; Attendance: 2,460; Referees: Bonaventura, Bonaventura (FRA)

5 December 2019; 20:30	Norway	30–24	Angola	Aqua Dome Kumamoto, Minami-ku; Attendance: 1,870; Referees: García, Paolantoni (ARG)
5 December 2019; 20:30	Hegh Arntzen 6	(13–12)	Carlos 6	Aqua Dome Kumamoto, Minami-ku; Attendance: 1,870; Referees: García, Paolantoni (ARG)
5 December 2019; 20:30	3× (yellow card) 2× (suspension)	Report	1× (yellow card) 5× (suspension)	Aqua Dome Kumamoto, Minami-ku; Attendance: 1,870; Referees: García, Paolantoni (ARG)

6 December 2019; 15:00	Serbia	29–27	Slovenia	Aqua Dome Kumamoto, Minami-ku; Attendance: 4,680; Referees: Makhlouf, Krichen (TUN)
6 December 2019; 15:00	Pop-Lazić 8	(12–11)	Stanko 10	Aqua Dome Kumamoto, Minami-ku; Attendance: 4,680; Referees: Makhlouf, Krichen (TUN)
6 December 2019; 15:00	1× (yellow card) 4× (suspension)	Report	2× (yellow card) 2× (suspension)	Aqua Dome Kumamoto, Minami-ku; Attendance: 4,680; Referees: Makhlouf, Krichen (TUN)

6 December 2019; 18:00	Angola	40–30	Cuba	Aqua Dome Kumamoto, Minami-ku; Attendance: 2,680; Referees: Belkhiri, Hamidi (ALG)
6 December 2019; 18:00	Guialo 7	(20–16)	Lusson 7	Aqua Dome Kumamoto, Minami-ku; Attendance: 2,680; Referees: Belkhiri, Hamidi (ALG)
6 December 2019; 18:00	6× (suspension)	Report	1× (yellow card) 6× (suspension)	Aqua Dome Kumamoto, Minami-ku; Attendance: 2,680; Referees: Belkhiri, Hamidi (ALG)

6 December 2019; 20:30	Netherlands	30–28	Norway	Aqua Dome Kumamoto, Minami-ku; Attendance: 3,380; Referees: García, Marín (ESP)
6 December 2019; 20:30	Abbingh 6	(14–18)	Oftedal 9	Aqua Dome Kumamoto, Minami-ku; Attendance: 3,380; Referees: García, Marín (ESP)
6 December 2019; 20:30	2× (yellow card) 1× (suspension)	Report	2× (suspension)	Aqua Dome Kumamoto, Minami-ku; Attendance: 3,380; Referees: García, Marín (ESP)

=== Group B ===
Pos	Team	Pld	W	D	L	GF	GA	GD	Pts	Qualification
1	South Korea	5	3	2	0	149	124	+25	8	Main round
2	Germany	5	3	1	1	142	111	+31	7 (Note: Denmark 25–26 Germany)	Main round
3	Denmark	5	3	1	1	132	100	+32	7	Main round
4	France	5	2	1	2	137	100	+37	5	
5	Brazil	5	1	1	3	119	115	+4	3	
6	Australia	5	0	0	5	53	182	−129	0	

Source: IHF
Rules for classification: 1) points; 2) head-to-head points; 3) head-to-head goal difference; 4) head-to-head number of goals scored; 5) goal difference.
Notes:

30 November 2019; 15:00	Germany	30–24	Brazil	Yamaga City Overall Gymnasium, Yamaga; Attendance: 1,300; Referees: García, Marín (ESP)
30 November 2019; 15:00	Behnke 6	(14–11)	Nascimento 5	Yamaga City Overall Gymnasium, Yamaga; Attendance: 1,300; Referees: García, Marín (ESP)
30 November 2019; 15:00	1× (yellow card) 4× (suspension)	Report	1× (yellow card) 1× (suspension)	Yamaga City Overall Gymnasium, Yamaga; Attendance: 1,300; Referees: García, Marín (ESP)

30 November 2019; 18:00	France	27–29	South Korea	Yamaga City Overall Gymnasium, Yamaga; Attendance: 1,450; Referees: Sosa, Lemes (URU)
30 November 2019; 18:00	Zaadi 5	(13–12)	Ryu 12	Yamaga City Overall Gymnasium, Yamaga; Attendance: 1,450; Referees: Sosa, Lemes (URU)
30 November 2019; 18:00	2× (yellow card) 5× (suspension)	Report	1× (yellow card) 2× (suspension) 1× (red card)	Yamaga City Overall Gymnasium, Yamaga; Attendance: 1,450; Referees: Sosa, Lemes (URU)

30 November 2019; 20:30	Denmark	37–12	Australia	Kumamoto Prefectural Gymnasium, Nishi-ku; Attendance: 1,400; Referees: Cheng, Zhou (CHN)
30 November 2019; 20:30	Østergaard 6	(17–4)	Potocki 4	Kumamoto Prefectural Gymnasium, Nishi-ku; Attendance: 1,400; Referees: Cheng, Zhou (CHN)
30 November 2019; 20:30	2× (yellow card) 2× (suspension)	Report	8× (suspension)	Kumamoto Prefectural Gymnasium, Nishi-ku; Attendance: 1,400; Referees: Cheng, Zhou (CHN)

1 December 2019; 15:00	Brazil	19–19	France	Yamaga City Overall Gymnasium, Yamaga; Attendance: 1,580; Referees: Lah, Sok (SVN)
1 December 2019; 15:00	four players 3	(7–10)	three players 3	Yamaga City Overall Gymnasium, Yamaga; Attendance: 1,580; Referees: Lah, Sok (SVN)
1 December 2019; 15:00	3× (suspension)	Report	2× (yellow card) 5× (suspension) 1× (red card)	Yamaga City Overall Gymnasium, Yamaga; Attendance: 1,580; Referees: Lah, Sok (SVN)

1 December 2019; 18:00	Australia	8–34	Germany	Yamaga City Overall Gymnasium, Yamaga; Attendance: 1,450; Referees: Hizaki, Ikebuchi (JPN)
1 December 2019; 18:00	Potocki 3	(4–16)	Lauenroth 6	Yamaga City Overall Gymnasium, Yamaga; Attendance: 1,450; Referees: Hizaki, Ikebuchi (JPN)
1 December 2019; 18:00	2× (suspension)	Report	1× (yellow card) 6× (suspension)	Yamaga City Overall Gymnasium, Yamaga; Attendance: 1,450; Referees: Hizaki, Ikebuchi (JPN)

1 December 2019; 20:30	South Korea	26–26	Denmark	Kumamoto Prefectural Gymnasium, Nishi-ku; Attendance: 1,380; Referees: Alpaidze, Berezkina (RUS)
1 December 2019; 20:30	Ryu 9	(13–10)	Højlund 4	Kumamoto Prefectural Gymnasium, Nishi-ku; Attendance: 1,380; Referees: Alpaidze, Berezkina (RUS)
1 December 2019; 20:30	1× (yellow card) 5× (suspension)	Report	1× (yellow card) 6× (suspension) 1× (red card)	Kumamoto Prefectural Gymnasium, Nishi-ku; Attendance: 1,380; Referees: Alpaidze, Berezkina (RUS)

3 December 2019; 15:00	South Korea	33–27	Brazil	Yamaga City Overall Gymnasium, Yamaga; Attendance: 1,750; Referees: Hamidi, Belkhiri (ALG)
3 December 2019; 15:00	Ryu, Shin 8	(16–14)	Amorim 9	Yamaga City Overall Gymnasium, Yamaga; Attendance: 1,750; Referees: Hamidi, Belkhiri (ALG)
3 December 2019; 15:00	2× (yellow card) 6× (suspension)	Report	2× (yellow card) 3× (suspension)	Yamaga City Overall Gymnasium, Yamaga; Attendance: 1,750; Referees: Hamidi, Belkhiri (ALG)

3 December 2019; 19:00	France	46–7	Australia	Yamaga City Overall Gymnasium, Yamaga; Attendance: 1,540; Referees: El-Saied, El-Saied (EGY)
3 December 2019; 19:00	Coatanea 7	(21–3)	Potocki 4	Yamaga City Overall Gymnasium, Yamaga; Attendance: 1,540; Referees: El-Saied, El-Saied (EGY)
3 December 2019; 19:00	1× (yellow card) 2× (suspension)	Report	1× (yellow card) 6× (suspension)	Yamaga City Overall Gymnasium, Yamaga; Attendance: 1,540; Referees: El-Saied, El-Saied (EGY)

3 December 2019; 20:30	Denmark	25–26	Germany	Kumamoto Prefectural Gymnasium, Nishi-ku; Attendance: 1,000; Referees: Sosa, Lemes (URU)
3 December 2019; 20:30	K. Jørgensen 5	(11–13)	Behnke 7	Kumamoto Prefectural Gymnasium, Nishi-ku; Attendance: 1,000; Referees: Sosa, Lemes (URU)
3 December 2019; 20:30	1× (yellow card) 2× (suspension)	Report	2× (yellow card) 5× (suspension)	Kumamoto Prefectural Gymnasium, Nishi-ku; Attendance: 1,000; Referees: Sosa, Lemes (URU)

4 December 2019; 15:00	Australia	17–34	South Korea	Yamaga City Overall Gymnasium, Yamaga; Attendance: 1,590; Referees: Lončar, Lončar (CRO)
4 December 2019; 15:00	Potocki 10	(10–18)	Lee 5	Yamaga City Overall Gymnasium, Yamaga; Attendance: 1,590; Referees: Lončar, Lončar (CRO)
4 December 2019; 15:00	1× (yellow card) 6× (suspension)	Report	3× (suspension)	Yamaga City Overall Gymnasium, Yamaga; Attendance: 1,590; Referees: Lončar, Lončar (CRO)

4 December 2019; 19:00	Germany	25–27	France	Yamaga City Overall Gymnasium, Yamaga; Attendance: 1,950; Referees: García, Marín (ESP)
4 December 2019; 19:00	Bölk 8	(12–14)	Zaadi 4	Yamaga City Overall Gymnasium, Yamaga; Attendance: 1,950; Referees: García, Marín (ESP)
4 December 2019; 19:00	2× (yellow card) 1× (suspension)	Report	1× (yellow card) 2× (suspension)	Yamaga City Overall Gymnasium, Yamaga; Attendance: 1,950; Referees: García, Marín (ESP)

4 December 2019; 20:30	Denmark	24–18	Brazil	Kumamoto Prefectural Gymnasium, Nishi-ku; Attendance: 1,100; Referees: García, Paolantoni (ARG)
4 December 2019; 20:30	S. Jørgensen 6	(11–9)	Vieira 5	Kumamoto Prefectural Gymnasium, Nishi-ku; Attendance: 1,100; Referees: García, Paolantoni (ARG)
4 December 2019; 20:30	1× (yellow card) 3× (suspension)	Report	5× (suspension)	Kumamoto Prefectural Gymnasium, Nishi-ku; Attendance: 1,100; Referees: García, Paolantoni (ARG)

6 December 2019; 15:00	Brazil	31–9	Australia	Yamaga City Overall Gymnasium, Yamaga; Attendance: 1,490; Referees: Cheng, Zhou (CHN)
6 December 2019; 15:00	Belo 5	(15–5)	Potocki 7	Yamaga City Overall Gymnasium, Yamaga; Attendance: 1,490; Referees: Cheng, Zhou (CHN)
6 December 2019; 15:00	1× (yellow card) 7× (suspension) 1× (red card)	Report	2× (suspension)	Yamaga City Overall Gymnasium, Yamaga; Attendance: 1,490; Referees: Cheng, Zhou (CHN)

6 December 2019; 19:00	Germany	27–27	South Korea	Yamaga City Overall Gymnasium, Yamaga; Attendance: 2,100; Referees: Alpaidze, Berezkina (RUS)
6 December 2019; 19:00	Behnke 7	(15–14)	Ryu 10	Yamaga City Overall Gymnasium, Yamaga; Attendance: 2,100; Referees: Alpaidze, Berezkina (RUS)
6 December 2019; 19:00	2× (yellow card) 6× (suspension)	Report	2× (suspension)	Yamaga City Overall Gymnasium, Yamaga; Attendance: 2,100; Referees: Alpaidze, Berezkina (RUS)

6 December 2019; 20:30	France	18–20	Denmark	Kumamoto Prefectural Gymnasium, Nishi-ku; Attendance: 1,600; Referees: Lah, Sok (SVN)
6 December 2019; 20:30	Lacrabère 6	(7–9)	S. Jørgensen 7	Kumamoto Prefectural Gymnasium, Nishi-ku; Attendance: 1,600; Referees: Lah, Sok (SVN)
6 December 2019; 20:30	3× (yellow card) 4× (suspension)	Report	6× (suspension)	Kumamoto Prefectural Gymnasium, Nishi-ku; Attendance: 1,600; Referees: Lah, Sok (SVN)

=== Group C ===
Pos	Team	Pld	W	D	L	GF	GA	GD	Pts	Qualification
1	Spain	5	5	0	0	159	103	+56	10	Main round
2	Montenegro	5	4	0	1	137	123	+14	8	Main round
3	Romania	5	3	0	2	121	129	−8	6	Main round
4	Hungary	5	2	0	3	145	117	+28	4	
5	Senegal	5	1	0	4	119	137	−18	2	
6	Kazakhstan	5	0	0	5	92	164	−72	0	

Source: IHF
Rules for classification: 1) points; 2) head-to-head points; 3) head-to-head goal difference; 4) head-to-head number of goals scored; 5) goal difference.

30 November 2019; 15:00	Montenegro	29–25	Senegal	Yatsushiro General Gymnasium, Yatsushiro; Attendance: 1,900; Referees: Kuttler, Merz (GER)
30 November 2019; 15:00	Jauković 7	(14–15)	Keïta, Sankharé 5	Yatsushiro General Gymnasium, Yatsushiro; Attendance: 1,900; Referees: Kuttler, Merz (GER)
30 November 2019; 15:00	3× (yellow card) 5× (suspension)	Report	1× (yellow card) 2× (suspension)	Yatsushiro General Gymnasium, Yatsushiro; Attendance: 1,900; Referees: Kuttler, Merz (GER)

30 November 2019; 18:00	Romania	16–31	Spain	Kumamoto Prefectural Gymnasium, Nishi-ku; Attendance: 1,300; Referees: Bonaventura, Bonaventura (FRA)
30 November 2019; 18:00	Neagu 6	(9–16)	Cabral, Fernández 6	Kumamoto Prefectural Gymnasium, Nishi-ku; Attendance: 1,300; Referees: Bonaventura, Bonaventura (FRA)
30 November 2019; 18:00	2× (yellow card) 7× (suspension)	Report	1× (yellow card) 5× (suspension)	Kumamoto Prefectural Gymnasium, Nishi-ku; Attendance: 1,300; Referees: Bonaventura, Bonaventura (FRA)

30 November 2019; 18:00	Hungary	39–15	Kazakhstan	Yatsushiro General Gymnasium, Yatsushiro; Attendance: 1,800; Referees: Hizaki, Ikebuchi (JPN)
30 November 2019; 18:00	Márton, Schatzl 7	(22–8)	Abilda 5	Yatsushiro General Gymnasium, Yatsushiro; Attendance: 1,800; Referees: Hizaki, Ikebuchi (JPN)
30 November 2019; 18:00	1× (suspension)	Report		Yatsushiro General Gymnasium, Yatsushiro; Attendance: 1,800; Referees: Hizaki, Ikebuchi (JPN)

1 December 2019; 15:00	Kazakhstan	21–30	Montenegro	Yatsushiro General Gymnasium, Yatsushiro; Attendance: 1,910; Referees: El-Saied, El-Saied (EGY)
1 December 2019; 15:00	Alexandrova 5	(11–13)	Radičević 9	Yatsushiro General Gymnasium, Yatsushiro; Attendance: 1,910; Referees: El-Saied, El-Saied (EGY)
1 December 2019; 15:00	3× (suspension)	Report	1× (yellow card) 5× (suspension)	Yatsushiro General Gymnasium, Yatsushiro; Attendance: 1,910; Referees: El-Saied, El-Saied (EGY)

1 December 2019; 18:00	Spain	29–25	Hungary	Kumamoto Prefectural Gymnasium, Nishi-ku; Attendance: 1,600; Referees: Christiansen, Hansen (DEN)
1 December 2019; 18:00	Cabral 7	(18–13)	Tóvizi 5	Kumamoto Prefectural Gymnasium, Nishi-ku; Attendance: 1,600; Referees: Christiansen, Hansen (DEN)
1 December 2019; 18:00	1× (yellow card) 4× (suspension) 1× (red card)	Report	1× (yellow card) 5× (suspension)	Kumamoto Prefectural Gymnasium, Nishi-ku; Attendance: 1,600; Referees: Christiansen, Hansen (DEN)

1 December 2019; 18:00	Senegal	24–29	Romania	Yatsushiro General Gymnasium, Yatsushiro; Attendance: 1,850; Referees: Koo, Lee (KOR)
1 December 2019; 18:00	three players 6	(12–15)	Neagu 13	Yatsushiro General Gymnasium, Yatsushiro; Attendance: 1,850; Referees: Koo, Lee (KOR)
1 December 2019; 18:00	2× (yellow card) 3× (suspension)	Report	4× (yellow card) 7× (suspension)	Yatsushiro General Gymnasium, Yatsushiro; Attendance: 1,850; Referees: Koo, Lee (KOR)

3 December 2019; 15:00	Hungary	24–25	Montenegro	Kumamoto Prefectural Gymnasium, Nishi-ku; Attendance: 1,600; Referees: García, Marín (ESP)
3 December 2019; 15:00	Schatzl 7	(12–13)	Radičević 8	Kumamoto Prefectural Gymnasium, Nishi-ku; Attendance: 1,600; Referees: García, Marín (ESP)
3 December 2019; 15:00	2× (yellow card) 2× (suspension)	Report	1× (yellow card) 7× (suspension) 1× (red card)	Kumamoto Prefectural Gymnasium, Nishi-ku; Attendance: 1,600; Referees: García, Marín (ESP)

3 December 2019; 15:00	Spain	29–20	Senegal	Yatsushiro General Gymnasium, Yatsushiro; Attendance: 1,950; Referees: Lah, Sok (SVN)
3 December 2019; 15:00	Cabral 8	(14–13)	Camara 6	Yatsushiro General Gymnasium, Yatsushiro; Attendance: 1,950; Referees: Lah, Sok (SVN)
3 December 2019; 15:00	3× (yellow card) 5× (suspension)	Report	4× (suspension)	Yatsushiro General Gymnasium, Yatsushiro; Attendance: 1,950; Referees: Lah, Sok (SVN)

3 December 2019; 19:00	Romania	22–20	Kazakhstan	Yatsushiro General Gymnasium, Yatsushiro; Attendance: 1,810; Referees: Cheng, Zhou (CHN)
3 December 2019; 19:00	Pintea 5	(14–11)	Khardina 6	Yatsushiro General Gymnasium, Yatsushiro; Attendance: 1,810; Referees: Cheng, Zhou (CHN)
3 December 2019; 19:00	1× (yellow card) 3× (suspension)	Report	1× (suspension)	Yatsushiro General Gymnasium, Yatsushiro; Attendance: 1,810; Referees: Cheng, Zhou (CHN)

4 December 2019; 15:00	Montenegro	27–26	Romania	Kumamoto Prefectural Gymnasium, Nishi-ku; Attendance: 1,700; Referees: Christiansen, Hansen (DEN)
4 December 2019; 15:00	Radičević, Raičević 6	(11–12)	Neagu 11	Kumamoto Prefectural Gymnasium, Nishi-ku; Attendance: 1,700; Referees: Christiansen, Hansen (DEN)
4 December 2019; 15:00	3× (yellow card) 7× (suspension) 1× (red card)	Report	1× (yellow card) 7× (suspension) 1× (red card)	Kumamoto Prefectural Gymnasium, Nishi-ku; Attendance: 1,700; Referees: Christiansen, Hansen (DEN)

4 December 2019; 15:00	Kazakhstan	16–43	Spain	Yatsushiro General Gymnasium, Yatsushiro; Attendance: 2,000; Referees: El-Saied, El-Saied (EGY)
4 December 2019; 15:00	Abilda, Rejemetova 3	(11–19)	M. López 10	Yatsushiro General Gymnasium, Yatsushiro; Attendance: 2,000; Referees: El-Saied, El-Saied (EGY)
4 December 2019; 15:00	5× (suspension)	Report	4× (suspension)	Yatsushiro General Gymnasium, Yatsushiro; Attendance: 2,000; Referees: El-Saied, El-Saied (EGY)

4 December 2019; 19:00	Hungary	30–20	Senegal	Yatsushiro General Gymnasium, Yatsushiro; Attendance: 2,020; Referees: Alpaidze, Berezkina (RUS)
4 December 2019; 19:00	Kovács 6	(17–9)	Sankharé 6	Yatsushiro General Gymnasium, Yatsushiro; Attendance: 2,020; Referees: Alpaidze, Berezkina (RUS)
4 December 2019; 19:00	1× (yellow card) 2× (suspension)	Report	1× (yellow card) 4× (suspension)	Yatsushiro General Gymnasium, Yatsushiro; Attendance: 2,020; Referees: Alpaidze, Berezkina (RUS)

6 December 2019; 15:00	Senegal	30–20	Kazakhstan	Kumamoto Prefectural Gymnasium, Nishi-ku; Attendance: 1,700; Referees: Hizaki, Ikebuchi (JPN)
6 December 2019; 15:00	Camara 8	(15–7)	Abilda 7	Kumamoto Prefectural Gymnasium, Nishi-ku; Attendance: 1,700; Referees: Hizaki, Ikebuchi (JPN)
6 December 2019; 15:00	3× (suspension)	Report	1× (yellow card) 6× (suspension) 1× (red card)	Kumamoto Prefectural Gymnasium, Nishi-ku; Attendance: 1,700; Referees: Hizaki, Ikebuchi (JPN)

6 December 2019; 15:00	Montenegro	26–27	Spain	Yatsushiro General Gymnasium, Yatsushiro; Attendance: 2,000; Referees: Bonaventura, Bonaventura (FRA)
6 December 2019; 15:00	Radičević 7	(14–14)	Cabral, Pena 6	Yatsushiro General Gymnasium, Yatsushiro; Attendance: 2,000; Referees: Bonaventura, Bonaventura (FRA)
6 December 2019; 15:00	7× (suspension)	Report	2× (yellow card) 4× (suspension)	Yatsushiro General Gymnasium, Yatsushiro; Attendance: 2,000; Referees: Bonaventura, Bonaventura (FRA)

6 December 2019; 19:00	Romania	28–27	Hungary	Yatsushiro General Gymnasium, Yatsushiro; Attendance: 2,500; Referees: Kuttler, Merz (GER)
6 December 2019; 19:00	Neagu 10	(10–16)	Kovacsics, Szabó 6	Yatsushiro General Gymnasium, Yatsushiro; Attendance: 2,500; Referees: Kuttler, Merz (GER)
6 December 2019; 19:00	2× (yellow card) 6× (suspension)	Report	2× (yellow card) 5× (suspension)	Yatsushiro General Gymnasium, Yatsushiro; Attendance: 2,500; Referees: Kuttler, Merz (GER)

=== Group D ===
Pos	Team	Pld	W	D	L	GF	GA	GD	Pts	Qualification
1	Russia	5	5	0	0	158	91	+67	10	Main round
2	Sweden	5	4	0	1	144	114	+30	8	Main round
3	Japan (H)	5	3	0	2	136	121	+15	6	Main round
4	Argentina	5	2	0	3	124	133	−9	4	
5	DR Congo	5	1	0	4	86	137	−51	2	
6	China	5	0	0	5	100	152	−52	0	

Source: IHF
Rules for classification: 1) points; 2) head-to-head points; 3) head-to-head goal difference; 4) head-to-head number of goals scored; 5) goal difference.
(H) Hosts

30 November 2019; 15:00	Japan	24–20	Argentina	Park Dome Kumamoto, Higashi-ku; Attendance: 9,100; Referees: Năstase, Stancu (ROU)
30 November 2019; 15:00	Ohyama 5	(14–10)	Karsten 7	Park Dome Kumamoto, Higashi-ku; Attendance: 9,100; Referees: Năstase, Stancu (ROU)
30 November 2019; 15:00	2× (yellow card) 9× (suspension)	Report	2× (yellow card) 4× (suspension)	Park Dome Kumamoto, Higashi-ku; Attendance: 9,100; Referees: Năstase, Stancu (ROU)

30 November 2019; 18:00	Russia	26–11	China	Park Dome Kumamoto, Higashi-ku; Attendance: 4,900; Referees: Lončar, Lončar (CRO)
30 November 2019; 18:00	Managarova 5	(13–6)	Chen 4	Park Dome Kumamoto, Higashi-ku; Attendance: 4,900; Referees: Lončar, Lončar (CRO)
30 November 2019; 18:00	3× (suspension)	Report	4× (suspension)	Park Dome Kumamoto, Higashi-ku; Attendance: 4,900; Referees: Lončar, Lončar (CRO)

30 November 2019; 20:30	Sweden	26–16	DR Congo	Park Dome Kumamoto, Higashi-ku; Attendance: 2,230; Referees: Antić, Jakovljević (SRB)
30 November 2019; 20:30	Lagerquist 6	(11–8)	Mwasesa 6	Park Dome Kumamoto, Higashi-ku; Attendance: 2,230; Referees: Antić, Jakovljević (SRB)
30 November 2019; 20:30	3× (yellow card) 2× (suspension)	Report	1× (yellow card) 3× (suspension)	Park Dome Kumamoto, Higashi-ku; Attendance: 2,230; Referees: Antić, Jakovljević (SRB)

2 December 2019; 15:00	Argentina	22–35	Russia	Park Dome Kumamoto, Higashi-ku; Attendance: 6,628; Referees: Cheng, Zhou (CHN)
2 December 2019; 15:00	three players 4	(12–17)	Gorshenina 5	Park Dome Kumamoto, Higashi-ku; Attendance: 6,628; Referees: Cheng, Zhou (CHN)
2 December 2019; 15:00	3× (yellow card) 1× (suspension)	Report	1× (yellow card) 7× (suspension) 1× (red card)	Park Dome Kumamoto, Higashi-ku; Attendance: 6,628; Referees: Cheng, Zhou (CHN)

2 December 2019; 18:00	DR Congo	16–28	Japan	Park Dome Kumamoto, Higashi-ku; Attendance: 4,476; Referees: Lončar, Lončar (CRO)
2 December 2019; 18:00	Ngo 4	(9–17)	Ohyama 6	Park Dome Kumamoto, Higashi-ku; Attendance: 4,476; Referees: Lončar, Lončar (CRO)
2 December 2019; 18:00	1× (yellow card) 2× (suspension)	Report	4× (suspension)	Park Dome Kumamoto, Higashi-ku; Attendance: 4,476; Referees: Lončar, Lončar (CRO)

2 December 2019; 20:30	China	19–32	Sweden	Park Dome Kumamoto, Higashi-ku; Attendance: 2,100; Referees: Stancu, Năstase (ROU)
2 December 2019; 20:30	Jin 5	(7–16)	three players 4	Park Dome Kumamoto, Higashi-ku; Attendance: 2,100; Referees: Stancu, Năstase (ROU)
2 December 2019; 20:30	1× (yellow card) 6× (suspension)	Report	2× (yellow card) 6× (suspension)	Park Dome Kumamoto, Higashi-ku; Attendance: 2,100; Referees: Stancu, Năstase (ROU)

3 December 2019; 14:30	Russia	34–13	DR Congo	Park Dome Kumamoto, Higashi-ku; Attendance: 6,765; Referees: Hizaki, Ikebuchi (JPN)
3 December 2019; 14:30	Managarova 6	(19–7)	Mwasesa 5	Park Dome Kumamoto, Higashi-ku; Attendance: 6,765; Referees: Hizaki, Ikebuchi (JPN)
3 December 2019; 14:30	4× (suspension)	Report	5× (suspension) 1× (red card)	Park Dome Kumamoto, Higashi-ku; Attendance: 6,765; Referees: Hizaki, Ikebuchi (JPN)

3 December 2019; 17:00	China	28–34	Argentina	Park Dome Kumamoto, Higashi-ku; Attendance: 1,985; Referees: Antić, Jakovljević (SRB)
3 December 2019; 17:00	Jin 10	(13–18)	Karsten 12	Park Dome Kumamoto, Higashi-ku; Attendance: 1,985; Referees: Antić, Jakovljević (SRB)
3 December 2019; 17:00	4× (suspension)	Report	1× (yellow card) 3× (suspension)	Park Dome Kumamoto, Higashi-ku; Attendance: 1,985; Referees: Antić, Jakovljević (SRB)

3 December 2019; 19:30	Sweden	34–26	Japan	Park Dome Kumamoto, Higashi-ku; Attendance: 6,375; Referees: Krichen, Makhlouf (TUN)
3 December 2019; 19:30	Blohm 7	(20–13)	Tanabe 5	Park Dome Kumamoto, Higashi-ku; Attendance: 6,375; Referees: Krichen, Makhlouf (TUN)
3 December 2019; 19:30	1× (yellow card) 4× (suspension)	Report	4× (suspension)	Park Dome Kumamoto, Higashi-ku; Attendance: 6,375; Referees: Krichen, Makhlouf (TUN)

5 December 2019; 15:00	DR Congo	25–24	China	Park Dome Kumamoto, Higashi-ku; Attendance: 6,729; Referees: Kuttler, Merz (GER)
5 December 2019; 15:00	Mwasesa 12	(10–11)	Jin 8	Park Dome Kumamoto, Higashi-ku; Attendance: 6,729; Referees: Kuttler, Merz (GER)
5 December 2019; 15:00	2× (yellow card) 6× (suspension) 1× (red card)	Report	1× (yellow card) 5× (suspension)	Park Dome Kumamoto, Higashi-ku; Attendance: 6,729; Referees: Kuttler, Merz (GER)

5 December 2019; 18:00	Japan	23–33	Russia	Park Dome Kumamoto, Higashi-ku; Attendance: 6,220; Referees: Antić, Jakovljević (SRB)
5 December 2019; 18:00	Sasaki 7	(16–16)	Sen 8	Park Dome Kumamoto, Higashi-ku; Attendance: 6,220; Referees: Antić, Jakovljević (SRB)
5 December 2019; 18:00	1× (yellow card) 2× (suspension)	Report	1× (yellow card) 2× (suspension)	Park Dome Kumamoto, Higashi-ku; Attendance: 6,220; Referees: Antić, Jakovljević (SRB)

5 December 2019; 20:30	Sweden	30–23	Argentina	Park Dome Kumamoto, Higashi-ku; Attendance: 2,442; Referees: Lončar, Lončar (CRO)
5 December 2019; 20:30	Mässing 5	(14–11)	Mendoza 8	Park Dome Kumamoto, Higashi-ku; Attendance: 2,442; Referees: Lončar, Lončar (CRO)
5 December 2019; 20:30	1× (yellow card) 5× (suspension)	Report	2× (yellow card) 3× (suspension)	Park Dome Kumamoto, Higashi-ku; Attendance: 2,442; Referees: Lončar, Lončar (CRO)

6 December 2019; 15:00	Japan	35–18	China	Park Dome Kumamoto, Higashi-ku; Attendance: 8,310; Referees: Sosa, Lemes (URU)
6 December 2019; 15:00	Akiyama 8	(17–8)	Sun 5	Park Dome Kumamoto, Higashi-ku; Attendance: 8,310; Referees: Sosa, Lemes (URU)
6 December 2019; 15:00	2× (yellow card) 2× (suspension)	Report	2× (yellow card) 5× (suspension)	Park Dome Kumamoto, Higashi-ku; Attendance: 8,310; Referees: Sosa, Lemes (URU)

6 December 2019; 18:00	Argentina	25–16	DR Congo	Park Dome Kumamoto, Higashi-ku; Attendance: 2,950; Referees: Christiansen, Hansen (DEN)
6 December 2019; 18:00	Karsten 8	(9–13)	Mwasesa 5	Park Dome Kumamoto, Higashi-ku; Attendance: 2,950; Referees: Christiansen, Hansen (DEN)
6 December 2019; 18:00	2× (yellow card) 3× (suspension)	Report	5× (suspension)	Park Dome Kumamoto, Higashi-ku; Attendance: 2,950; Referees: Christiansen, Hansen (DEN)

6 December 2019; 20:30	Russia	30–22	Sweden	Park Dome Kumamoto, Higashi-ku; Attendance: 3,826; Referees: Koo, Lee (KOR)
6 December 2019; 20:30	Frolova 11	(16–12)	Gulldén 8	Park Dome Kumamoto, Higashi-ku; Attendance: 3,826; Referees: Koo, Lee (KOR)
6 December 2019; 20:30	3× (yellow card) 8× (suspension)	Report	5× (suspension)	Park Dome Kumamoto, Higashi-ku; Attendance: 3,826; Referees: Koo, Lee (KOR)

== President's Cup ==
=== 21st–24th place playoffs ===
21st–24th place semifinals
8 December
Cuba	45
Australia	25
8 December
Kazakhstan	29
China	23

21st place
9 December
Cuba (pen.)	33
Kazakhstan	31
23rd place
9 December
Australia	15
China	33

==== 21st–24th place semifinals ====
8 December 2019; 10:00	Cuba	45–25	Australia	Kumamoto Prefectural Gymnasium, Nishi-ku; Attendance: 800; Referees: Lemes, Sosa (URU)
8 December 2019; 10:00	Robert, Téllez 7	(25–16)	Potocki 10	Kumamoto Prefectural Gymnasium, Nishi-ku; Attendance: 800; Referees: Lemes, Sosa (URU)
8 December 2019; 10:00	1× (yellow card) 8× (suspension) 2× (red card)	Report	4× (suspension) 1× (red card)	Kumamoto Prefectural Gymnasium, Nishi-ku; Attendance: 800; Referees: Lemes, Sosa (URU)

8 December 2019; 12:30	Kazakhstan	29–23	China	Kumamoto Prefectural Gymnasium, Nishi-ku; Attendance: 1,000; Referees: Antić, Jakovljević (SRB)
8 December 2019; 12:30	Rejemetova 8	(16–15)	Jin 7	Kumamoto Prefectural Gymnasium, Nishi-ku; Attendance: 1,000; Referees: Antić, Jakovljević (SRB)
8 December 2019; 12:30	1× (yellow card) 1× (suspension)	Report	1× (yellow card) 2× (suspension)	Kumamoto Prefectural Gymnasium, Nishi-ku; Attendance: 1,000; Referees: Antić, Jakovljević (SRB)

==== 23rd place game ====
9 December 2019; 12:30	Australia	15–33	China	Park Dome Kumamoto, Higashi-ku; Attendance: 6,920; Referees: Lemes, Sosa (URU)
9 December 2019; 12:30	Potocki 9	(7–17)	Chen 11	Park Dome Kumamoto, Higashi-ku; Attendance: 6,920; Referees: Lemes, Sosa (URU)
9 December 2019; 12:30	1× (yellow card) 3× (suspension)	Report	2× (yellow card) 4× (suspension)	Park Dome Kumamoto, Higashi-ku; Attendance: 6,920; Referees: Lemes, Sosa (URU)

==== 21st place game ====
9 December 2019
12:30
Cuba
33–31
Kazakhstan
Kumamoto Prefectural Gymnasium, Nishi-ku
Attendance: 1,700
Referees: Cheng, Zhou (CHN)
Camejo, Toledo 7
(15–14)
Khardina 9
3× (yellow card) 4× (suspension) 1× (red card)
Report
1× (yellow card)

FT: 29–29 Pen: 4–2

=== 17–20th place playoffs ===
17–20th place semifinals
8 December
Slovenia	19
Brazil	32
8 December
Senegal	28
DR Congo	23

17th place
9 December
Brazil	22
Senegal	18
19th place
9 December
Slovenia	29
DR Congo	27

==== 17–20th place semifinals ====
8 December 2019; 15:00	Slovenia	19–32	Brazil	Kumamoto Prefectural Gymnasium, Nishi-ku; Attendance: 1,100; Referees: Lee, Koo (KOR)
8 December 2019; 15:00	Gros 5	(9–18)	Araújo, Lima 6	Kumamoto Prefectural Gymnasium, Nishi-ku; Attendance: 1,100; Referees: Lee, Koo (KOR)
8 December 2019; 15:00	4× (suspension)	Report	1× (suspension)	Kumamoto Prefectural Gymnasium, Nishi-ku; Attendance: 1,100; Referees: Lee, Koo (KOR)

8 December 2019; 18:00	Senegal	28–23	DR Congo	Kumamoto Prefectural Gymnasium, Nishi-ku; Attendance: 600; Referees: Năstase, Stancu (ROU)
8 December 2019; 18:00	N'Diaye, Sankharé 6	(16–9)	Mwasesa 7	Kumamoto Prefectural Gymnasium, Nishi-ku; Attendance: 600; Referees: Năstase, Stancu (ROU)
8 December 2019; 18:00	3× (yellow card) 2× (suspension)	Report	1× (yellow card) 3× (suspension)	Kumamoto Prefectural Gymnasium, Nishi-ku; Attendance: 600; Referees: Năstase, Stancu (ROU)

==== 19th place game ====
9 December 2019; 15:00	Slovenia	29–27	DR Congo	Kumamoto Prefectural Gymnasium, Nishi-ku; Attendance: 1,900; Referees: Belkhiri, Hamidi (ALG)
9 December 2019; 15:00	Stanko 13	(14–13)	Mwasesa 9	Kumamoto Prefectural Gymnasium, Nishi-ku; Attendance: 1,900; Referees: Belkhiri, Hamidi (ALG)
9 December 2019; 15:00	2× (yellow card) 3× (suspension)	Report	2× (yellow card) 3× (suspension)	Kumamoto Prefectural Gymnasium, Nishi-ku; Attendance: 1,900; Referees: Belkhiri, Hamidi (ALG)

==== 17th place game ====
9 December 2019; 18:00	Brazil	22–18	Senegal	Kumamoto Prefectural Gymnasium, Nishi-ku; Attendance: 600; Referees: El-Saied, El-Saied (EGY)
9 December 2019; 18:00	Nascimento 4	(13–9)	Sankharé 7	Kumamoto Prefectural Gymnasium, Nishi-ku; Attendance: 600; Referees: El-Saied, El-Saied (EGY)
9 December 2019; 18:00	1× (yellow card) 4× (suspension)	Report	3× (suspension)	Kumamoto Prefectural Gymnasium, Nishi-ku; Attendance: 600; Referees: El-Saied, El-Saied (EGY)

=== 13–16th place playoffs ===
13–16th place semifinals
8 December
Hungary	34
Argentina	26
8 December
Angola	17
France	28

13th place
9 December
Hungary	21
France	26
15th place
9 December
Argentina	27
Angola	30

==== 13–16th place semifinals ====
8 December 2019; 12:30	Angola	17–28	France	Aqua Dome Kumamoto, Minami-ku; Attendance: 3,430; Referees: Lončar, Lončar (CRO)
8 December 2019; 12:30	Guialo 4	(9–9)	Nze Minko 5	Aqua Dome Kumamoto, Minami-ku; Attendance: 3,430; Referees: Lončar, Lončar (CRO)
8 December 2019; 12:30	4× (suspension) 1× (red card)	Report	3× (yellow card) 3× (suspension)	Aqua Dome Kumamoto, Minami-ku; Attendance: 3,430; Referees: Lončar, Lončar (CRO)

8 December 2019; 12:30	Hungary	34–26	Argentina	Park Dome Kumamoto, Higashi-ku; Attendance: 3,726; Referees: Christiansen, Hansen (DEN)
8 December 2019; 12:30	Kovacsics 7	(19–12)	Karsten 9	Park Dome Kumamoto, Higashi-ku; Attendance: 3,726; Referees: Christiansen, Hansen (DEN)
8 December 2019; 12:30	3× (suspension)	Report		Park Dome Kumamoto, Higashi-ku; Attendance: 3,726; Referees: Christiansen, Hansen (DEN)

==== 15th place game ====
9 December 2019; 15:00	Argentina	27–30	Angola	Park Dome Kumamoto, Higashi-ku; Attendance: 6,464; Referees: Hizaki, Ikebuchi (JPN)
9 December 2019; 15:00	Karsten 6	(17–13)	Guialo 11	Park Dome Kumamoto, Higashi-ku; Attendance: 6,464; Referees: Hizaki, Ikebuchi (JPN)
9 December 2019; 15:00	3× (suspension)	Report	1× (yellow card) 9× (suspension)	Park Dome Kumamoto, Higashi-ku; Attendance: 6,464; Referees: Hizaki, Ikebuchi (JPN)

==== 13th place game ====
9 December 2019; 18:00	Hungary	21–26	France	Park Dome Kumamoto, Higashi-ku; Attendance: 2,920; Referees: Alpaidze, Berezkina (RUS)
9 December 2019; 18:00	Lukács 7	(12–12)	Lacrabère 6	Park Dome Kumamoto, Higashi-ku; Attendance: 2,920; Referees: Alpaidze, Berezkina (RUS)
9 December 2019; 18:00	1× (yellow card) 2× (suspension)	Report	3× (suspension)	Park Dome Kumamoto, Higashi-ku; Attendance: 2,920; Referees: Alpaidze, Berezkina (RUS)

== Main round ==
=== Group I ===
Pos	Team	Pld	W	D	L	GF	GA	GD	Pts	Qualification
1	Norway	5	4	0	1	146	128	+18	8	Semifinals
2	Netherlands	5	3	0	2	153	136	+17	6	Semifinals
3	Serbia	5	2	1	2	139	151	−12	5 (Note: Germany 28–29 Serbia)	Fifth place game
4	Germany	5	2	1	2	135	136	−1	5	Seventh place game
5	Denmark	5	1	2	2	123	124	−1	4	
6	South Korea	5	0	2	3	144	165	−21	2	

Source: IHF
Rules for classification: 1) points; 2) head-to-head points; 3) head-to-head goal difference; 4) head-to-head number of goals scored; 5) goal difference.
Notes:

8 December 2019; 15:00	Serbia	36–33	South Korea	Aqua Dome Kumamoto, Minami-ku; Attendance: 3,450; Referees: García, Marín (ESP)
8 December 2019; 15:00	Lavko 7	(21–16)	Ryu 10	Aqua Dome Kumamoto, Minami-ku; Attendance: 3,450; Referees: García, Marín (ESP)
8 December 2019; 15:00	1× (yellow card) 7× (suspension) 1× (red card)	Report	1× (yellow card) 4× (suspension)	Aqua Dome Kumamoto, Minami-ku; Attendance: 3,450; Referees: García, Marín (ESP)

8 December 2019; 18:00	Netherlands	23–25	Germany	Aqua Dome Kumamoto, Minami-ku; Attendance: 4,020; Referees: Bonaventura, Bonaventura (FRA)
8 December 2019; 18:00	Dulfer 4	(12–11)	Bölk 6	Aqua Dome Kumamoto, Minami-ku; Attendance: 4,020; Referees: Bonaventura, Bonaventura (FRA)
8 December 2019; 18:00	4× (suspension)	Report	1× (yellow card) 1× (suspension)	Aqua Dome Kumamoto, Minami-ku; Attendance: 4,020; Referees: Bonaventura, Bonaventura (FRA)

8 December 2019; 20:30	Norway	22–19	Denmark	Aqua Dome Kumamoto, Minami-ku; Attendance: 1,890; Referees: Alpaidze, Berezkina (RUS)
8 December 2019; 20:30	Hegh Arntzen 5	(12–9)	Grigel, Højlund 4	Aqua Dome Kumamoto, Minami-ku; Attendance: 1,890; Referees: Alpaidze, Berezkina (RUS)
8 December 2019; 20:30	1× (yellow card) 4× (suspension)	Report	2× (yellow card) 3× (suspension)	Aqua Dome Kumamoto, Minami-ku; Attendance: 1,890; Referees: Alpaidze, Berezkina (RUS)

9 December 2019; 15:00	Germany	28–29	Serbia	Aqua Dome Kumamoto, Minami-ku; Attendance: 5,090; Referees: Năstase, Stancu (ROU)
9 December 2019; 15:00	Berger, Minevskaja 6	(17–19)	Cvijić 7	Aqua Dome Kumamoto, Minami-ku; Attendance: 5,090; Referees: Năstase, Stancu (ROU)
9 December 2019; 15:00	1× (yellow card) 5× (suspension)	Report	2× (yellow card) 5× (suspension) 1× (red card)	Aqua Dome Kumamoto, Minami-ku; Attendance: 5,090; Referees: Năstase, Stancu (ROU)

9 December 2019; 18:00	Denmark	27–24	Netherlands	Aqua Dome Kumamoto, Minami-ku; Attendance: 2,200; Referees: García, Marín (ESP)
9 December 2019; 18:00	Hansen 5	(14–9)	Polman, Snelder 5	Aqua Dome Kumamoto, Minami-ku; Attendance: 2,200; Referees: García, Marín (ESP)
9 December 2019; 18:00	3× (yellow card) 6× (suspension)	Report	1× (yellow card) 4× (suspension)	Aqua Dome Kumamoto, Minami-ku; Attendance: 2,200; Referees: García, Marín (ESP)

9 December 2019; 20:30	South Korea	25–36	Norway	Aqua Dome Kumamoto, Minami-ku; Attendance: 2,120; Referees: Bonaventura, Bonaventura (FRA)
9 December 2019; 20:30	Ryu 7	(10–20)	Oftedal 7	Aqua Dome Kumamoto, Minami-ku; Attendance: 2,120; Referees: Bonaventura, Bonaventura (FRA)
9 December 2019; 20:30	1× (yellow card) 3× (suspension)	Report	2× (yellow card) 2× (suspension)	Aqua Dome Kumamoto, Minami-ku; Attendance: 2,120; Referees: Bonaventura, Bonaventura (FRA)

11 December 2019; 15:00	Netherlands	40–33	South Korea	Aqua Dome Kumamoto, Minami-ku; Attendance: 5,070; Referees: Năstase, Stancu (ROU)
11 December 2019; 15:00	Abbingh 11	(23–16)	Ryu 9	Aqua Dome Kumamoto, Minami-ku; Attendance: 5,070; Referees: Năstase, Stancu (ROU)
11 December 2019; 15:00	1× (yellow card) 7× (suspension) 1× (red card)	Report	1× (yellow card) 2× (suspension)	Aqua Dome Kumamoto, Minami-ku; Attendance: 5,070; Referees: Năstase, Stancu (ROU)

11 December 2019; 18:00	Serbia	26–26	Denmark	Aqua Dome Kumamoto, Minami-ku; Attendance: 3,080; Referees: García, Marín (ESP)
11 December 2019; 18:00	Pop-Lazić 6	(14–11)	S. Jørgensen 6	Aqua Dome Kumamoto, Minami-ku; Attendance: 3,080; Referees: García, Marín (ESP)
11 December 2019; 18:00	1× (yellow card) 6× (suspension)	Report	2× (yellow card) 2× (suspension)	Aqua Dome Kumamoto, Minami-ku; Attendance: 3,080; Referees: García, Marín (ESP)

11 December 2019; 20:30	Norway	32–29	Germany	Aqua Dome Kumamoto, Minami-ku; Attendance: 3,520; Referees: Alpaidze, Berezkina (RUS)
11 December 2019; 20:30	Brattset Dale 6	(17–16)	Bölk 6	Aqua Dome Kumamoto, Minami-ku; Attendance: 3,520; Referees: Alpaidze, Berezkina (RUS)
11 December 2019; 20:30	2× (suspension)	Report	1× (yellow card) 2× (suspension)	Aqua Dome Kumamoto, Minami-ku; Attendance: 3,520; Referees: Alpaidze, Berezkina (RUS)

=== Group II ===
Pos	Team	Pld	W	D	L	GF	GA	GD	Pts	Qualification
1	Russia	5	5	0	0	161	117	+44	10	Semifinals
2	Spain	5	3	1	1	145	137	+8	7	Semifinals
3	Montenegro	5	3	0	2	137	137	0	6	Fifth place game
4	Sweden	5	2	1	2	141	132	+9	5	Seventh place game
5	Japan (H)	5	1	0	4	143	150	−7	2	
6	Romania	5	0	0	5	102	156	−54	0	

Source: IHF
Rules for classification: 1) points; 2) head-to-head points; 3) head-to-head goal difference; 4) head-to-head number of goals scored; 5) goal difference.
(H) Hosts

8 December 2019; 15:00	Romania	18–27	Russia	Park Dome Kumamoto, Higashi-ku; Attendance: 5,870; Referees: García, Paolantoni (ARG)
8 December 2019; 15:00	Neagu 5	(10–10)	Bobrovnikova, Vyakhireva 5	Park Dome Kumamoto, Higashi-ku; Attendance: 5,870; Referees: García, Paolantoni (ARG)
8 December 2019; 15:00	1× (yellow card) 3× (suspension) 1× (red card)	Report	2× (yellow card) 4× (suspension)	Park Dome Kumamoto, Higashi-ku; Attendance: 5,870; Referees: García, Paolantoni (ARG)

8 December 2019; 18:00	Montenegro	30–26	Japan	Park Dome Kumamoto, Higashi-ku; Attendance: 7,356; Referees: Belkhiri, Hamidi (ALG)
8 December 2019; 18:00	Radičević 8	(14–11)	Fujita 7	Park Dome Kumamoto, Higashi-ku; Attendance: 7,356; Referees: Belkhiri, Hamidi (ALG)
8 December 2019; 18:00	1× (yellow card) 3× (suspension)	Report	2× (yellow card) 3× (suspension)	Park Dome Kumamoto, Higashi-ku; Attendance: 7,356; Referees: Belkhiri, Hamidi (ALG)

8 December 2019; 20:30	Spain	28–28	Sweden	Park Dome Kumamoto, Higashi-ku; Attendance: 2,132; Referees: Lah, Sok (SVN)
8 December 2019; 20:30	Cabral 6	(14–8)	Hagman, Mässing 8	Park Dome Kumamoto, Higashi-ku; Attendance: 2,132; Referees: Lah, Sok (SVN)
8 December 2019; 20:30	2× (yellow card) 7× (suspension) 1× (red card)	Report	2× (yellow card) 3× (suspension)	Park Dome Kumamoto, Higashi-ku; Attendance: 2,132; Referees: Lah, Sok (SVN)

10 December 2019; 15:00	Russia	35–28	Montenegro	Park Dome Kumamoto, Higashi-ku; Attendance: 6,338; Referees: Krichen, Makhlouf (TUN)
10 December 2019; 15:00	Managarova 12	(17–16)	Radičević 8	Park Dome Kumamoto, Higashi-ku; Attendance: 6,338; Referees: Krichen, Makhlouf (TUN)
10 December 2019; 15:00	1× (yellow card) 5× (suspension)	Report	2× (yellow card) 7× (suspension)	Park Dome Kumamoto, Higashi-ku; Attendance: 6,338; Referees: Krichen, Makhlouf (TUN)

10 December 2019; 18:00	Japan	31–33	Spain	Park Dome Kumamoto, Higashi-ku; Attendance: 3,428; Referees: Kuttler, Merz (GER)
10 December 2019; 18:00	Ohyama 6	(13–17)	Pena 7	Park Dome Kumamoto, Higashi-ku; Attendance: 3,428; Referees: Kuttler, Merz (GER)
10 December 2019; 18:00	3× (yellow card) 4× (suspension)	Report	2× (yellow card) 5× (suspension)	Park Dome Kumamoto, Higashi-ku; Attendance: 3,428; Referees: Kuttler, Merz (GER)

10 December 2019; 20:30	Sweden	34–22	Romania	Park Dome Kumamoto, Higashi-ku; Attendance: 1,980; Referees: Lemes, Sosa (URU)
10 December 2019; 20:30	Mellegård 7	(14–9)	three players 4	Park Dome Kumamoto, Higashi-ku; Attendance: 1,980; Referees: Lemes, Sosa (URU)
10 December 2019; 20:30	1× (yellow card) 4× (suspension)	Report	1× (yellow card) 3× (suspension)	Park Dome Kumamoto, Higashi-ku; Attendance: 1,980; Referees: Lemes, Sosa (URU)

11 December 2019; 15:00	Spain	26–36	Russia	Park Dome Kumamoto, Higashi-ku; Attendance: 6,281; Referees: Bonaventura, Bonaventura (FRA)
11 December 2019; 15:00	Cabral 6	(12–16)	Frolova 9	Park Dome Kumamoto, Higashi-ku; Attendance: 6,281; Referees: Bonaventura, Bonaventura (FRA)
11 December 2019; 15:00	1× (suspension)	Report	2× (yellow card) 2× (suspension)	Park Dome Kumamoto, Higashi-ku; Attendance: 6,281; Referees: Bonaventura, Bonaventura (FRA)

11 December 2019; 18:00	Romania	20–37	Japan	Park Dome Kumamoto, Higashi-ku; Attendance: 3,962; Referees: Belkhiri, Hamidi (ALG)
11 December 2019; 18:00	Perianu, Udriștioiu 4	(8–18)	Sasaki 8	Park Dome Kumamoto, Higashi-ku; Attendance: 3,962; Referees: Belkhiri, Hamidi (ALG)
11 December 2019; 18:00	1× (yellow card) 3× (suspension)	Report		Park Dome Kumamoto, Higashi-ku; Attendance: 3,962; Referees: Belkhiri, Hamidi (ALG)

11 December 2019; 20:30	Montenegro	26–23	Sweden	Park Dome Kumamoto, Higashi-ku; Attendance: 1,926; Referees: García, Paolantoni (ARG)
11 December 2019; 20:30	Mehmedović 7	(12–12)	Blohm 7	Park Dome Kumamoto, Higashi-ku; Attendance: 1,926; Referees: García, Paolantoni (ARG)
11 December 2019; 20:30	3× (yellow card) 2× (suspension)	Report	4× (suspension)	Park Dome Kumamoto, Higashi-ku; Attendance: 1,926; Referees: García, Paolantoni (ARG)

== Final round ==
=== Bracket ===
Semifinals
13 December
Norway	22
Spain	28
13 December
Russia	32
Netherlands	33

Final
15 December
Spain	29
Netherlands	30
Third place
15 December
Norway	28
Russia	33

=== Semifinals ===
13 December 2019; 17:30	Russia	32–33	Netherlands	Park Dome Kumamoto, Higashi-ku; Attendance: 4,240; Referees: Bonaventura, Bonaventura (FRA)
13 December 2019; 17:30	Vyakhireva 11	(16–16)	Polman 9	Park Dome Kumamoto, Higashi-ku; Attendance: 4,240; Referees: Bonaventura, Bonaventura (FRA)
13 December 2019; 17:30	2× (yellow card) 3× (suspension)	Report	3× (suspension)	Park Dome Kumamoto, Higashi-ku; Attendance: 4,240; Referees: Bonaventura, Bonaventura (FRA)

13 December 2019; 20:30	Norway	22–28	Spain	Park Dome Kumamoto, Higashi-ku; Attendance: 4,261; Referees: Alpaidze, Berezkina (RUS)
13 December 2019; 20:30	Aune 5	(13–13)	Cabral 7	Park Dome Kumamoto, Higashi-ku; Attendance: 4,261; Referees: Alpaidze, Berezkina (RUS)
13 December 2019; 20:30	3× (yellow card) 3× (suspension)	Report	2× (yellow card) 5× (suspension)	Park Dome Kumamoto, Higashi-ku; Attendance: 4,261; Referees: Alpaidze, Berezkina (RUS)

=== Seventh place game ===
13 December 2019; 14:30	Germany	24–35	Sweden	Park Dome Kumamoto, Higashi-ku; Attendance: 6,860; Referees: García, Marín (ESP)
13 December 2019; 14:30	Stolle 6	(13–18)	Gulldén 7	Park Dome Kumamoto, Higashi-ku; Attendance: 6,860; Referees: García, Marín (ESP)
13 December 2019; 14:30	1× (yellow card) 2× (suspension)	Report	1× (yellow card) 1× (suspension)	Park Dome Kumamoto, Higashi-ku; Attendance: 6,860; Referees: García, Marín (ESP)

=== Fifth place game ===
13 December 2019; 11:30	Serbia	26–28	Montenegro	Park Dome Kumamoto, Higashi-ku; Attendance: 5,690; Referees: Belkhiri, Hamidi (ALG)
13 December 2019; 11:30	Stoiljković 6	(12–13)	Raičević, Ramusović 4	Park Dome Kumamoto, Higashi-ku; Attendance: 5,690; Referees: Belkhiri, Hamidi (ALG)
13 December 2019; 11:30	1× (yellow card)	Report	3× (yellow card) 4× (suspension)	Park Dome Kumamoto, Higashi-ku; Attendance: 5,690; Referees: Belkhiri, Hamidi (ALG)

=== Third place game ===
15 December 2019; 17:30	Norway	28–33	Russia	Park Dome Kumamoto, Higashi-ku; Attendance: 8,664; Referees: García, Marín (ESP)
15 December 2019; 17:30	Hegh Arntzen, Oftedal 7	(15–18)	Vyakhireva 9	Park Dome Kumamoto, Higashi-ku; Attendance: 8,664; Referees: García, Marín (ESP)
15 December 2019; 17:30	1× (yellow card) 4× (suspension)	Report	4× (suspension)	Park Dome Kumamoto, Higashi-ku; Attendance: 8,664; Referees: García, Marín (ESP)

=== Final ===
15 December 2019; 20:30	Spain	29–30	Netherlands	Park Dome Kumamoto, Higashi-ku; Attendance: 9,624; Referees: Bonaventura, Bonaventura (FRA)
15 December 2019; 20:30	Cabral 7	(13–16)	Polman 9	Park Dome Kumamoto, Higashi-ku; Attendance: 9,624; Referees: Bonaventura, Bonaventura (FRA)
15 December 2019; 20:30	2× (yellow card) 1× (suspension) 1× (red card)	Report	2× (yellow card) 3× (suspension)	Park Dome Kumamoto, Higashi-ku; Attendance: 9,624; Referees: Bonaventura, Bonaventura (FRA)

== Final ranking ==
Rank	Team
1st place, gold medalist(s)	Netherlands
2nd place, silver medalist(s)	Spain
3rd place, bronze medalist(s)	Russia
4	Norway
5	Montenegro
6	Serbia
7	Sweden
8	Germany
9	Denmark
10	Japan (Note: Japan directly qualified as the host of Olympics.)
11	South Korea
12	Romania
13	France
14	Hungary
15	Angola
16	Argentina
17	Brazil
18	Senegal
19	Slovenia
20	DR Congo
21	Cuba
22	Kazakhstan
23	China
24	Australia

Qualified for the 2020 Summer Olympics
Qualified for the 2020 Summer Olympics through other tournaments
Qualified for the Olympic Qualification Tournament
Qualified for the Olympic Qualification Tournament through other tournaments

2019 Women's World Champions

Netherlands
First title

Team roster: Jessy Kramer, Laura van der Heijden, Debbie Bont, Lois Abbingh, Larissa Nüsser, Danick Snelder, Bo van Wetering, Delaila Amega, Kelly Dulfer, Merel Freriks, Inger Smits, Martine Smeets, Angela Malestein, Rinka Duijndam, Tess Wester, Annick Lipman, Dione Housheer, Estavana Polman.
Head coach: Emmanuel Mayonnade.

=== All Star Team ===
The All Star Team and MVP was announced on 15 December 2019.

Position	Player
Most valuable player	Estavana Polman (NED)
Goalkeeper	Tess Wester (NED)
Right wing	Jovanka Radičević (MNE)
Right back	Anna Vyakhireva (RUS)
Centre back	Estavana Polman (NED)
Left back	Alexandrina Cabral (ESP)
Left wing	Camilla Herrem (NOR)
Pivot	Linn Blohm (SWE)

== Statistics ==
=== Top goalscorers ===
Rank	Name	Team	Goals	Shots	%
1	Lois Abbingh	Netherlands	71	114	62
2	Ryu Eun-hee	South Korea	69	114	61
3	Tjaša Stanko	Slovenia	62	98	63
4	Alexandrina Cabral	Spain	60	95	63
5	Estavana Polman	Netherlands	58	107	54
5	Jovanka Radičević	Montenegro	58	82	71
7	Stine Bredal Oftedal	Norway	51	82	62
8	Cristina Neagu	Romania	49	82	60
9	Yaroslava Frolova	Russia	48	69	70
10	Sally Potocki	Australia	47	100	47

Source: IHF

=== Top goalkeepers ===
Rank	Name	Team	%	Saves	Shots
1	Catherine Gabriel	France	42	34	81
2	Victoriya Kalinina	Russia	39	42	107
2	Sandra Toft	Denmark	39	90	229
4	Hatadou Sako	Senegal	37	85	228
5	Dinah Eckerle	Germany	36	103	290
6	Blanka Bíró	Hungary	35	43	123
6	Amandine Leynaud	France	35	46	133
6	Silje Solberg	Norway	35	113	321
9	Bárbara Arenhart	Brazil	34	49	146
9	Filippa Idéhn	Sweden	34	88	256

Source: IHF

=== Top assists ===
Rank	Name	Team	Assists
1	Anna Vyakhireva	Russia	62
2	Milena Raičević	Montenegro	51
3	Stine Bredal Oftedal	Norway	47
4	Estavana Polman	Netherlands	43
5	Emilie Hegh Arntzen	Norway	40
5	Yui Sunami	Japan	40
7	Kristina Liščević	Serbia	37
8	Alexandrina Cabral	Spain	33
9	Jelena Lavko	Serbia	31
9	Ryu Eun-hee	South Korea	31

Source: IHF
