= Aqua Dome Kumamoto =

Sports venue in Kumamoto, Japan

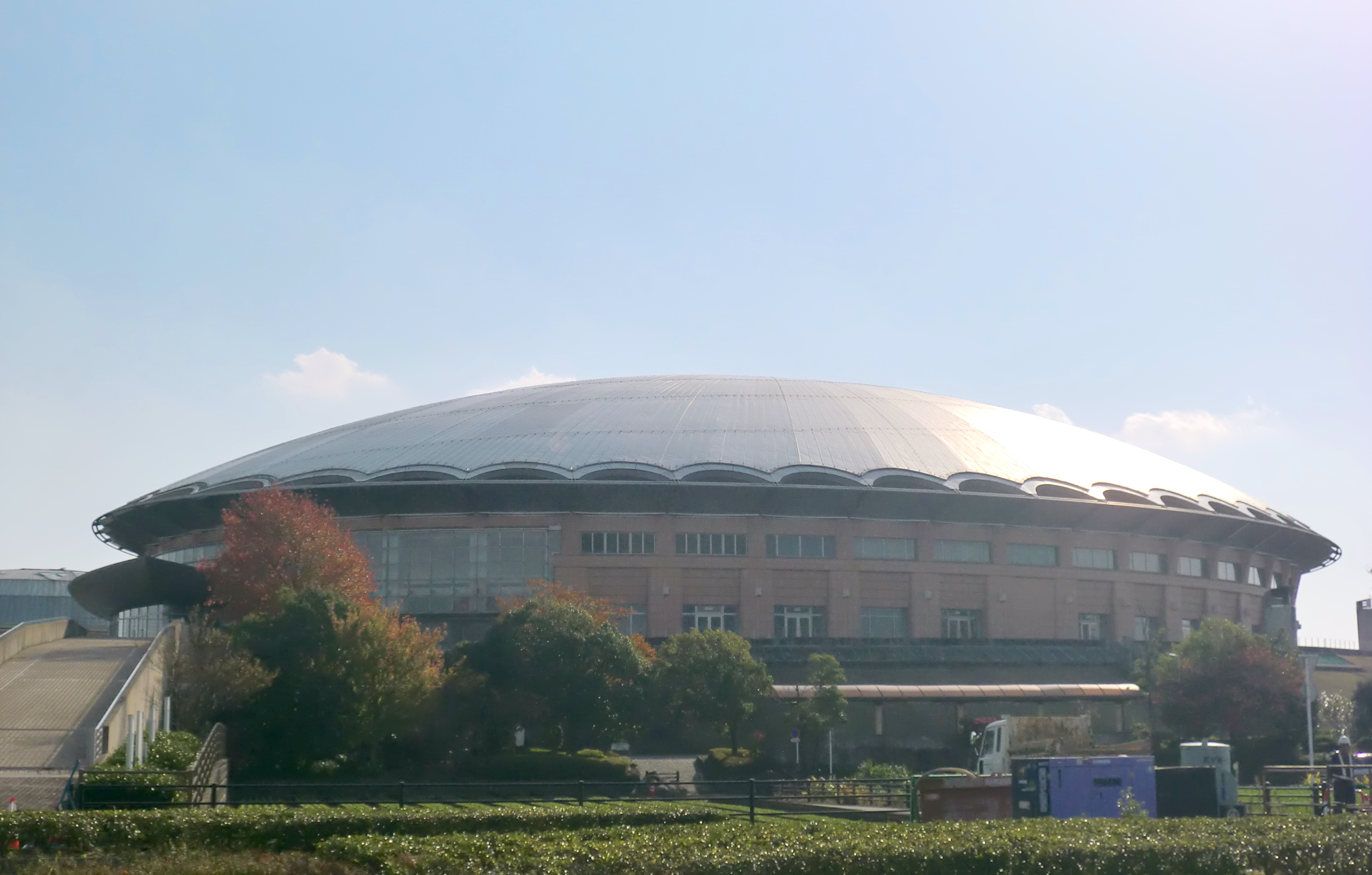
- Interactive map of Aqua Dome Kumamoto
- Location: 2 Chome-1-1 Arao, Minami-ku, Kumamoto, 861-4136, Japan
- Coordinates: 32.839158°N 130.802461°E
- Owner: City of Kumamoto
- Operator: Obayashi, Nissan Group, Tatara, Kobo Construction Co., Ltd.
- Capacity: 6,400

Construction
- Opened: 1998
- Cost: ¥16 million
- Architect: Yamashita Design

Aqua Dome Kumamoto is a multi-purpose indoor arena in Kumamoto, Kumamoto, Japan. The capacity of the arena is 6,400 and was opened in 1998.

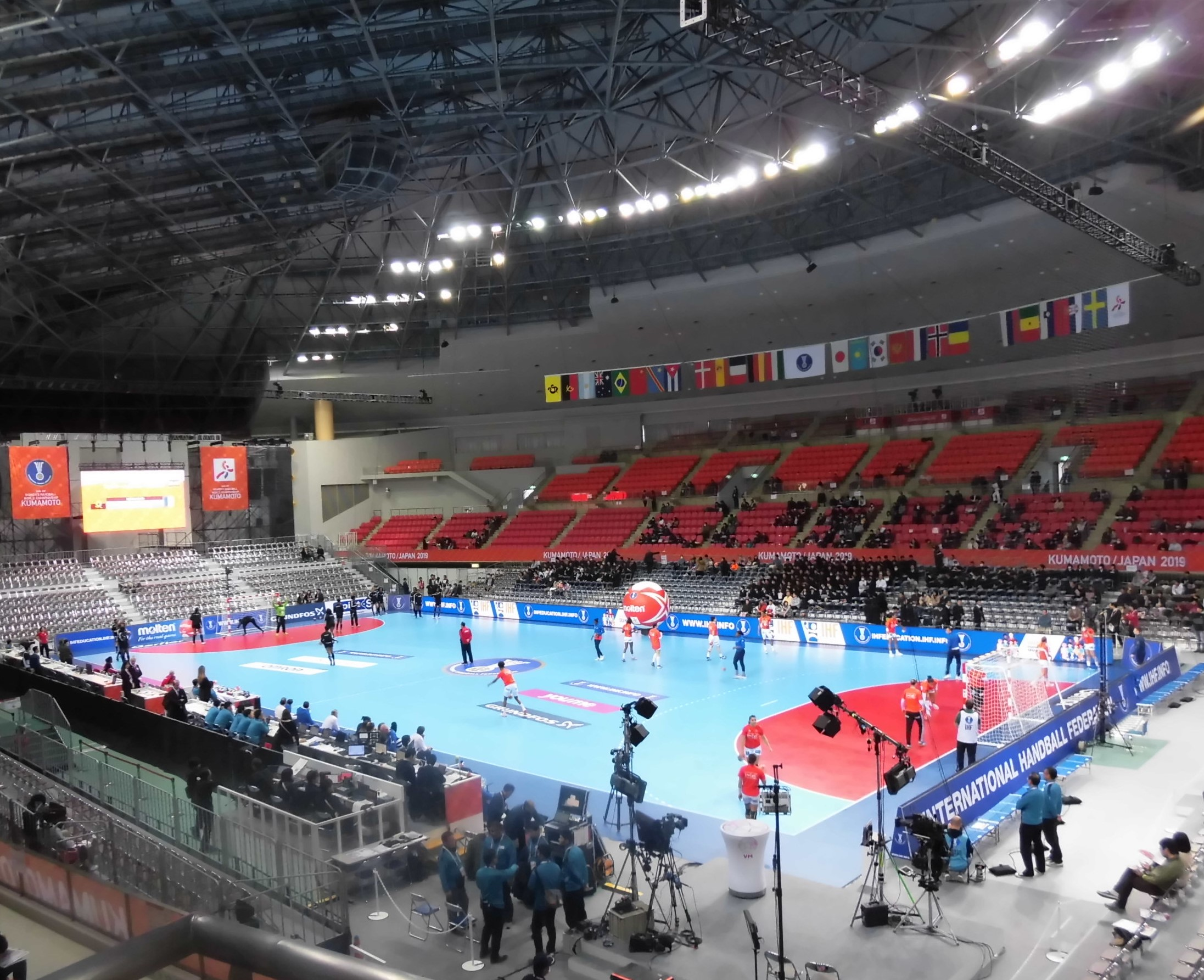
Aqua Dome inside at the 2019 World Women's Handball Championship.
