= Park Dome Kumamoto =

Indoor arena in Kumamoto, Japan

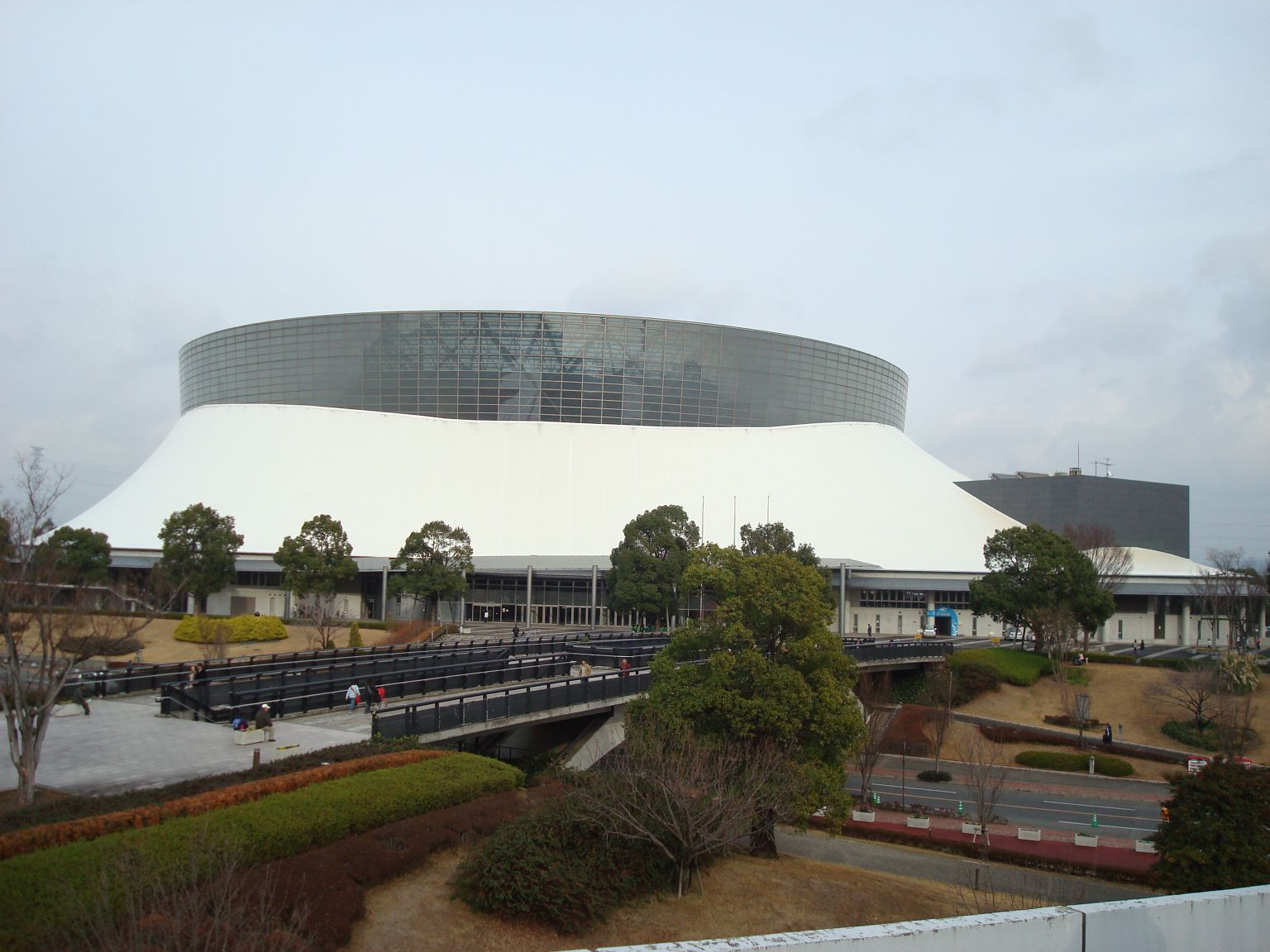
- Park Dome Kumamoto in December 2007
- Interactive map of Park Dome Kumamoto
- Location: 2974 Hirayama-cho, Higashi-ku, Kumamoto, Japan
- Coordinates: 32.839158°N 130.802461°E
- Owner: City of Kumamoto
- Operator: Kumamoto Sports Promotion Agency
- Capacity: 2,000

Construction
- Opened: 1997
- Architects: Daiichi-Kobo Associates; Fujita

Park Dome Kumamoto is a multi-purpose indoor arena in Kumamoto, Kumamoto, Japan. The capacity of the arena is 2,000 and was opened in 1997. Games were played here during the 1997 World Men's Handball Championship.

== See also ==
- KKWing Stadium

Preceded by Laugardalshöll; Reykjavík	World Men's Handball Championship; Final Venue; 1997	Succeeded by The Covered Hall; Cairo
Preceded by Barclaycard Arena; Hamburg	World Women's Handball Championship; Final Venue; 2019	Succeeded by TBD
