= Wards of Japan =

Subdivision of cities designated by government ordinance in Japan

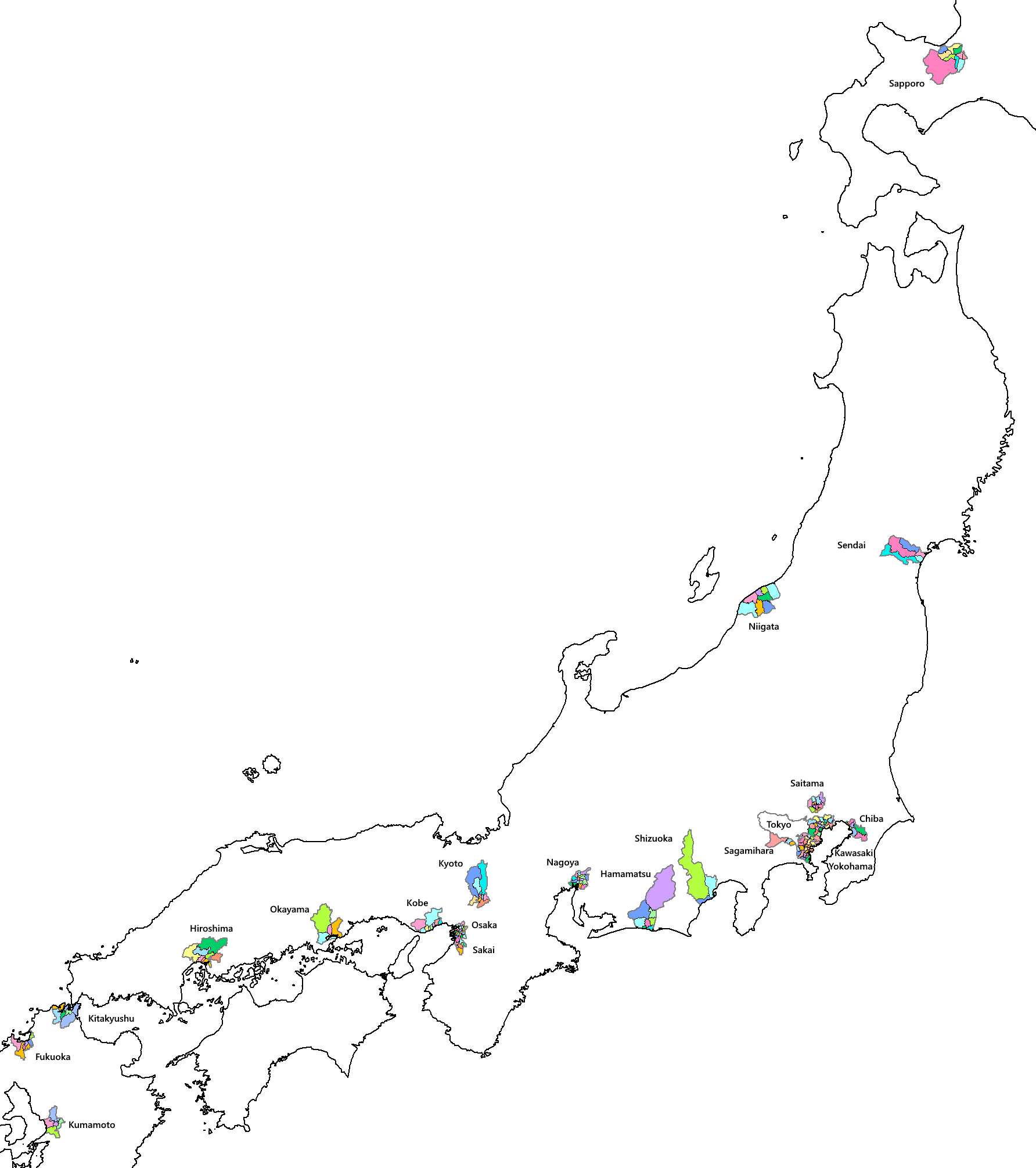
Japanese cities subdivided into wards

A ward (区, ku) is a subdivision of the cities of Japan that are large enough to have been designated by government ordinance. Wards are used to subdivide each city designated by government ordinance ("designated city"). The 23 special wards of Tokyo Metropolis have a municipal status, and are not the same as other entities referred to as ku, although their predecessors were.

Wards are local entities directly controlled by the municipal government. They handle administrative functions such as koseki registration, health insurance, and property taxation. Many wards have affiliated residents' organizations for a number of tasks, although these do not have any legal authority.

== List of wards ==
Ward	Japanese	City	Area (km^{2})
Chūō	中央区	Chiba	44.69
Hanamigawa	花見川区	Chiba	34.19
Inage	稲毛区	Chiba	21.22
Midori	緑区	Chiba	66.25
Mihama	美浜区	Chiba	21.20
Wakaba	若葉区	Chiba	84.21
Chūō	中央区	Fukuoka	15.39
Hakata	博多区	Fukuoka	31.62
Higashi	東区	Fukuoka	69.36
Jōnan	城南区	Fukuoka	15.99
Minami	南区	Fukuoka	30.98
Sawara	早良区	Fukuoka	95.87
Nishi	西区	Fukuoka	84.16
Chūō	中央区	Hamamatsu	268.45
Hamana	浜名区	Hamamatsu	345.77
Tenryū	天竜区	Hamamatsu	943.84
Aki	安芸区	Hiroshima	94.08
Asakita	安佐北区	Hiroshima	353.33
Asaminami	安佐南区	Hiroshima	117.24
Higashi	東区	Hiroshima	39.42
Minami	南区	Hiroshima	26.30
Naka	中区	Hiroshima	15.32
Nishi	西区	Hiroshima	35.61
Saeki	佐伯区	Hiroshima	225.22
Asao	麻生区	Kawasaki	23.25
Kawasaki	川崎区	Kawasaki	39.53
Miyamae	宮前区	Kawasaki	18.61
Nakahara	中原区	Kawasaki	14.74
Saiwai	幸区	Kawasaki	10.01
Takatsu	高津区	Kawasaki	16.36
Tama	多摩区	Kawasaki	20.50
Kokurakita	小倉北区	Kitakyushu	39.23
Kokuraminami	小倉南区	Kitakyushu	171.74
Moji	門司区	Kitakyushu	73.67
Tobata	戸畑区	Kitakyushu	16.61
Wakamatsu	若松区	Kitakyushu	71.31
Yahatahigashi	八幡東区	Kitakyushu	36.26
Yahatanishi	八幡西区	Kitakyushu	83.13
Chūō	中央区	Kobe	28.97
Higashinada	東灘区	Kobe	34.02
Hyōgo	兵庫区	Kobe	14.68
Kita	北区	Kobe	240.29
Nada	灘区	Kobe	32.66
Nagata	長田区	Kobe	11.36
Nishi	西区	Kobe	138.01
Suma	須磨区	Kobe	28.93
Tarumi	垂水区	Kobe	28.11
Chūō	中央区	Kumamoto	25.45
Higashi	東区	Kumamoto	50.19
Kita	北区	Kumamoto	115.34
Minami	南区	Kumamoto	110.01
Nishi	西区	Kumamoto	89.33
Fushimi	伏見区	Kyoto	61.66
Higashiyama	東山区	Kyoto	7.48
Kamigyō	上京区	Kyoto	7.03
Kita	北区	Kyoto	94.88
Minami	南区	Kyoto	15.81
Nakagyō	中京区	Kyoto	7.41
Nishikyō	西京区	Kyoto	59.24
Sakyō	左京区	Kyoto	246.77
Shimogyō	下京区	Kyoto	6.78
Ukyō	右京区	Kyoto	292.07
Yamashina	山科区	Kyoto	28.70
Atsuta	熱田区	Nagoya	8.20
Chikusa	千種区	Nagoya	18.18
Higashi	東区	Nagoya	7.71
Kita	北区	Nagoya	17.53
Meitō	名東区	Nagoya	19.45
Midori	緑区	Nagoya	37.91
Minami	南区	Nagoya	18.46
Minato	港区	Nagoya	45.63
Mizuho	瑞穂区	Nagoya	11.22
Moriyama	守山区	Nagoya	34.01
Naka	中区	Nagoya	9.38
Nakagawa	中川区	Nagoya	32.02
Nakamura	中村区	Nagoya	16.30
Nishi	西区	Nagoya	17.93
Shōwa	昭和区	Nagoya	10.94
Tenpaku	天白区	Nagoya	21.58
Akiha	秋葉区	Niigata	95.38
Chūō	中央区	Niigata	37.75
Higashi	東区	Niigata	38.62
Kita	北区	Niigata	107.72
Kōnan	江南区	Niigata	75.42
Minami	南区	Niigata	100.91
Nishi	西区	Niigata	94.09
Nishikan	西蒲区	Niigata	176.55
Higashi	東区	Okayama	160.53
Kita	北区	Okayama	450.70
Minami	南区	Okayama	127.48
Naka	中区	Okayama	51.25
Abeno	阿倍野区	Osaka	5.98
Asahi	旭区	Osaka	6.32
Chūō	中央区	Osaka	8.87
Fukushima	福島区	Osaka	4.67
Higashinari	東成区	Osaka	4.54
Higashisumiyoshi	東住吉区	Osaka	9.75
Higashiyodogawa	東淀川区	Osaka	13.27
Hirano	平野区	Osaka	15.28
Ikuno	生野区	Osaka	8.37
Joto	城東区	Osaka	8.38
Kita	北区	Osaka	10.34
Konohana	此花区	Osaka	19.25
Minato	港区	Osaka	7.86
Miyakojima	都島区	Osaka	6.08
Naniwa	浪速区	Osaka	4.39
Nishi	西区	Osaka	5.21
Nishinari	西成区	Osaka	7.37
Nishiyodogawa	西淀川区	Osaka	14.22
Suminoe	住之江区	Osaka	20.61
Sumiyoshi	住吉区	Osaka	9.40
Taishō	大正区	Osaka	9.43
Tennōji	天王寺区	Osaka	4.84
Tsurumi	鶴見区	Osaka	8.17
Yodogawa	淀川区	Osaka	12.64
Chūō	中央区	Sagamihara	36.87
Midori	緑区	Sagamihara	253.68
Minami	南区	Sagamihara	38.11
Chūō	中央区	Saitama	8.39
Iwatsuki	岩槻区	Saitama	49.17
Kita	北区	Saitama	16.86
Midori	緑区	Saitama	26.44
Minami	南区	Saitama	13.82
Minuma	見沼区	Saitama	30.69
Nishi	西区	Saitama	29.12
Omiya	大宮区	Saitama	12.80
Sakura	桜区	Saitama	18.64
Urawa	浦和区	Saitama	11.51
Higashi	東区	Sakai	10.49
Kita	北区	Sakai	15.60
Mihara	美原区	Sakai	13.20
Minami	南区	Sakai	40.39
Naka	中区	Sakai	17.88
Nishi	西区	Sakai	28.61
Sakai	堺区	Sakai	23.65
Atsubetsu	厚別区	Sapporo	24.38
Chūō	中央区	Sapporo	46.42
Higashi	東区	Sapporo	56.97
Kita	北区	Sapporo	63.57
Kiyota	清田区	Sapporo	59.87
Minami	南区	Sapporo	657.48
Nishi	西区	Sapporo	75.10
Shiroishi	白石区	Sapporo	34.47
Teine	手稲区	Sapporo	56.77
Toyohira	豊平区	Sapporo	46.23
Aoba	青葉区	Sendai	302.24
Izumi	泉区	Sendai	146.61
Miyagino	宮城野区	Sendai	58.19
Taihaku	太白区	Sendai	228.39
Wakabayashi	若林区	Sendai	50.86
Aoi	葵区	Shizuoka	1,073.76
Shimizu-	清水区	Shizuoka	265.09
Suruga	駿河区	Shizuoka	73.05
Aoba	青葉区	Yokohama	35.22
Asahi	旭区	Yokohama	32.73
Hodogaya	保土ケ谷区	Yokohama	21.93
Isogo	磯子区	Yokohama	19.05
Izumi	泉区	Yokohama	23.58
Kanagawa	神奈川区	Yokohama	23.73
Kanazawa	金沢区	Yokohama	30.96
Kōhoku	港北区	Yokohama	31.40
Kōnan	港南区	Yokohama	19.90
Midori	緑区	Yokohama	25.51
Minami	南区	Yokohama	12.65
Naka	中区	Yokohama	21.20
Nishi	西区	Yokohama	7.03
Sakae	栄区	Yokohama	18.52
Seya	瀬谷区	Yokohama	17.17
Totsuka	戸塚区	Yokohama	35.79
Tsurumi	鶴見区	Yokohama	33.23
Tsuzuki	都筑区	Yokohama	27.87

== Special wards of Tokyo ==
The special wards of Tokyo are not normal wards in the usual sense of the term, but instead are administrative units governed similarly to cities.

Ward	Japanese	Metropolis	Area (km^{2})
Adachi	足立区	Tokyo	53.25
Arakawa	荒川区	Tokyo	10.16
Bunkyō	文京区	Tokyo	11.29
Chiyoda	千代田区	Tokyo	11.66
Chūō	中央区	Tokyo	10.21
Edogawa	江戸川区	Tokyo	49.90
Itabashi	板橋区	Tokyo	32.22
Katsushika	葛飾区	Tokyo	34.80
Kita	北区	Tokyo	20.61
Kōtō	江東区	Tokyo	40.16
Meguro	目黒区	Tokyo	14.67
Minato	港区	Tokyo	20.37
Nakano	中野区	Tokyo	15.59
Nerima	練馬区	Tokyo	48.08
Ōta	大田区	Tokyo	60.66
Setagaya	世田谷区	Tokyo	58.05
Shibuya	渋谷区	Tokyo	15.11
Shinagawa	品川区	Tokyo	22.84
Shinjuku	新宿区	Tokyo	18.22
Suginami	杉並区	Tokyo	34.06
Sumida	墨田区	Tokyo	13.77
Toshima	豊島区	Tokyo	13.01
Taitō	台東区	Tokyo	10.11

== See also ==
- District (China), the original use of the ku kanji, still in use in Mainland China
- Administrative districts of South Korea, also pronounced gu
- District (Taiwan), same use of the ku in administrative divisions in the ROC Free Area
