= Nishi-ku, Kumamoto =

Ward of Kumamoto City in Kyūshū, Japan

Coordinates: 32°46′35″N 130°38′51″E

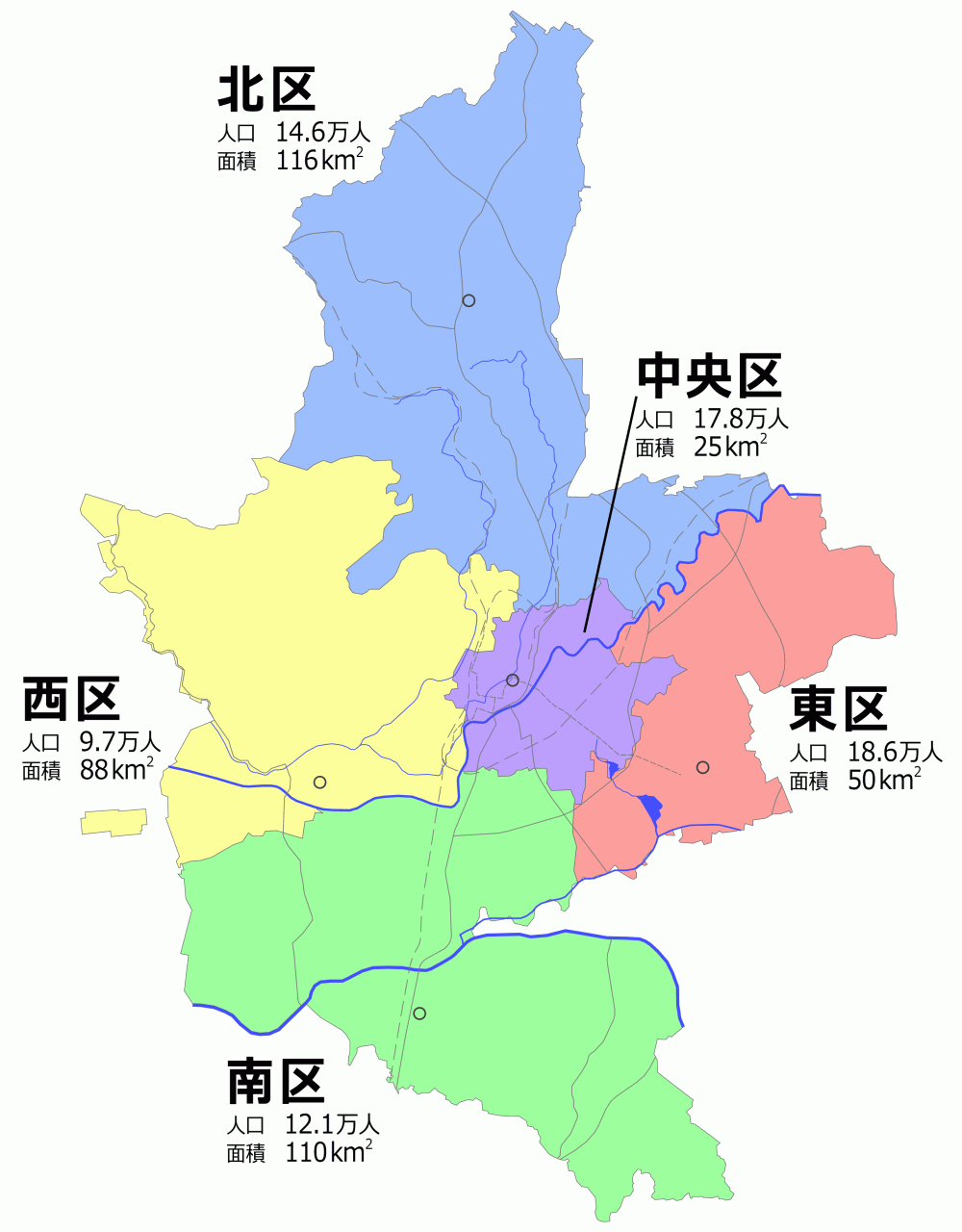
Map of Kumamoto's Wards

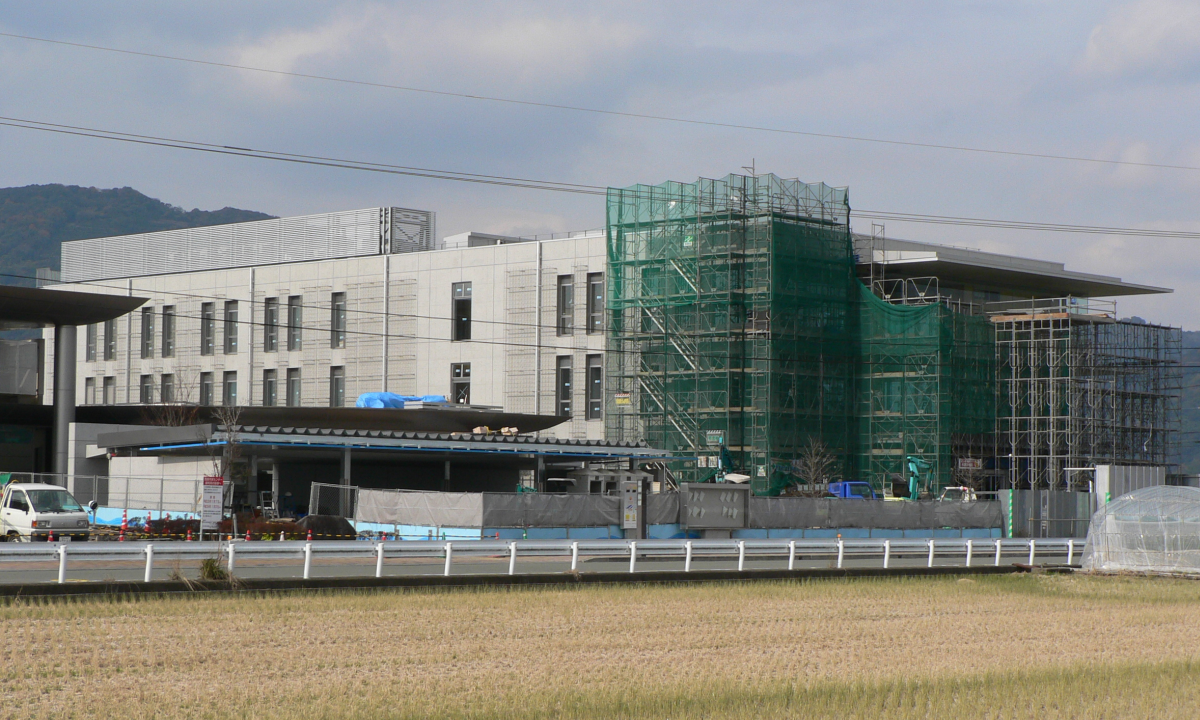
Nishi ward office

Nishi-ku (西区) is one of the five wards of Kumamoto City, Japan. Meaning literally "west ward," it is bordered by the Kita-ku, Chūō-ku, Minami-ku and also by the city of Tamana and the town of Gyokutō. As of 2020, it has a population of 91,177 people and an area of 88.21 km^{2}.
