= Roseline Ngo =

Congolese handball player (born 1993)

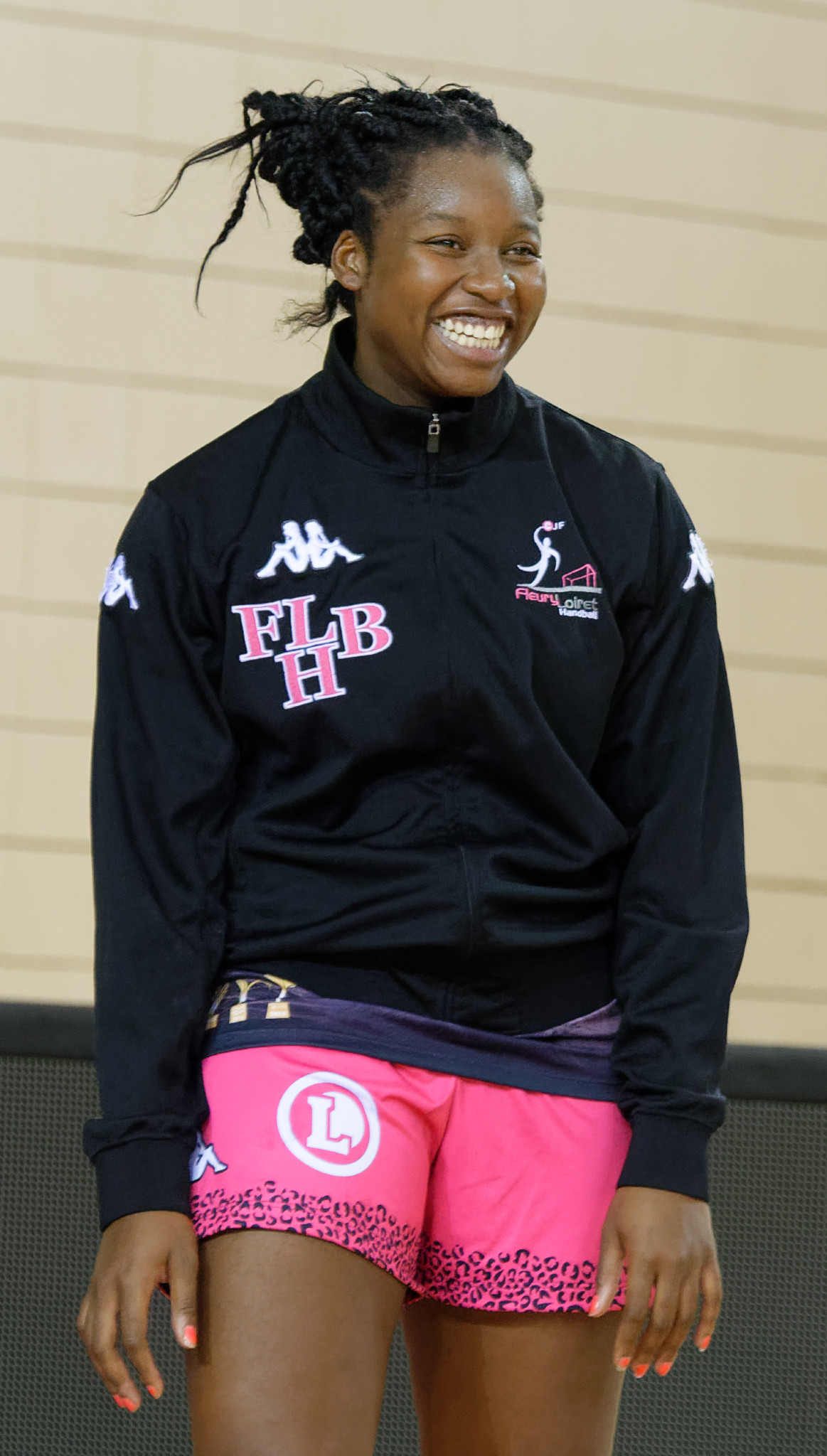

Personal information
- Full name: Roseline Ngo Leyi
- Nationality: Congolese
- Born: 27 April 1993 (age 33) Paris, France
- Height: 1.76 m (5 ft 9 in)

Sport
- Sport: Handball
- Position: Pivot
- Current club: Le Pouzin Handball
National team
- Years: Team
- –: DR Congo

Roseline Ngo Leyi (born 27 April 1993) is a Congolese handball player for Le Pouzin Handball and the DR Congo national team.

She represented DR Congo at the 2019 World Women's Handball Championship.
