= Amina Sankharé =

Senegalese handball player (born 1989)

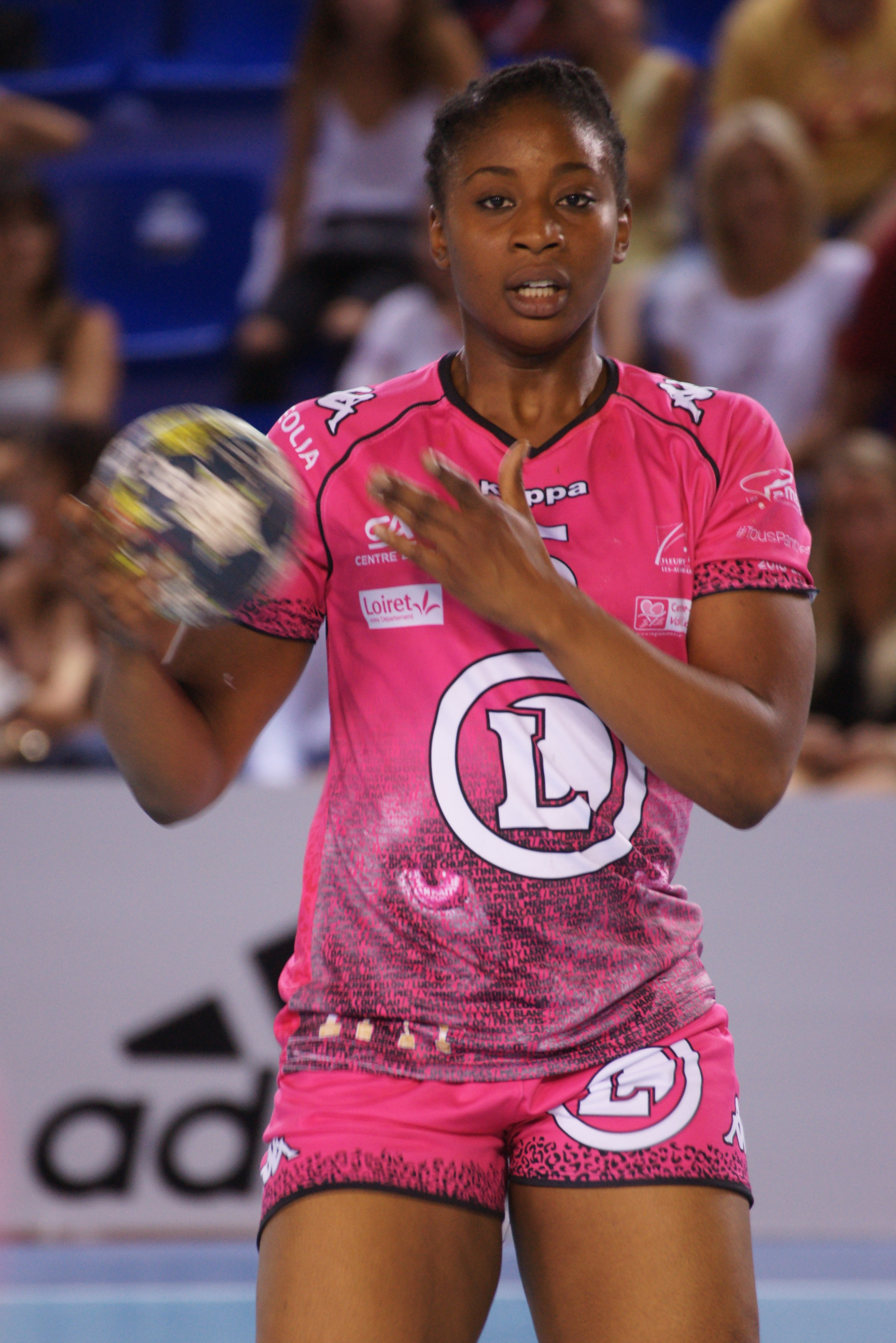

Personal information
- Nationality: Senegalese
- Born: 4 May 1989 (age 37) Aubervilliers, France
- Height: 1.72 m (5 ft 8 in)

Sport
- Sport: Handball
- Position: Centre back
- Current club: Fleury Loiret HB
- Number: 5
National team
- Years: Team
- –: Senegal

Amina Sankharé (born 4 May 1989) is a Senegalese handball player for Fleury Loiret HB and the Senegalese national team.

She competed at the 2019 World Women's Handball Championship in Japan.
