= Chen Shuo =

Chinese handball player (born 2000)

Personal information
- Nationality: Chinese
- Born: 18 November 2000 (age 25)
- Height: 1.80 m (5 ft 11 in)

Sport
- Sport: Handball
- Position: Left back
- Current club: Guangdong Handball
National team
Years	Team	Apps	(Gls)
2019–	China	7	(19)

Chen Shuo (born 18 November 2000) is a Chinese handball player for Shanghai Handball and the Chinese national team.

She represented China at the 2019 World Women's Handball Championship in Japan, where the Chinese team placed 23rd.
