= Higashi-ku, Kumamoto =

Ward of Kumamoto City in Kyūshū, Japan

Coordinates: 32°46′50″N 130°46′05″E

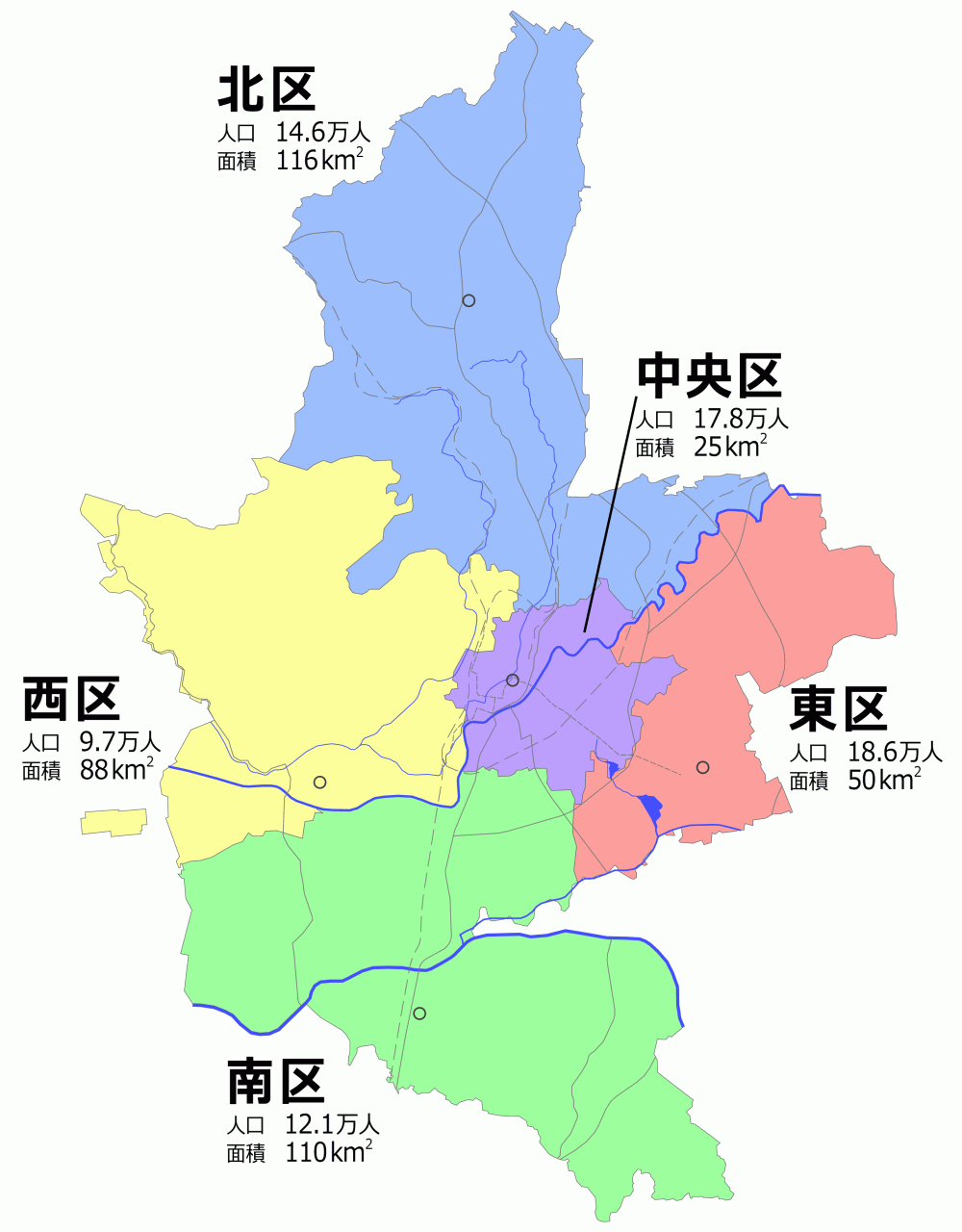
Map of Kumamoto's Wards

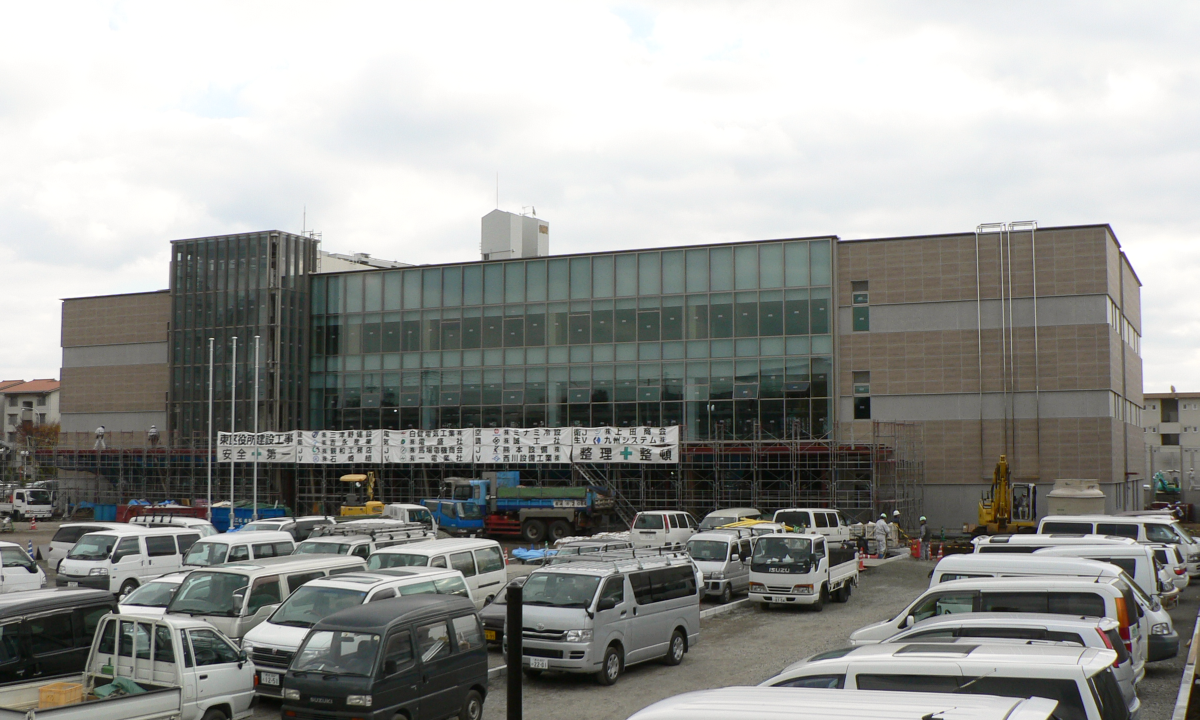
Higashi ward office

Higashi-ku (東区) is one of the five wards of Kumamoto City, Japan. Meaning literally "east ward," it is bordered by the Kita-ku, Chūō-ku, Minami-ku and also by the towns of Kikuyō, Mashiki and Kashima. As of 2020, it has a population of 189,524 people and an area of 50.32 km^{2}.
