= Julia Behnke =

German handball player (born 1993)

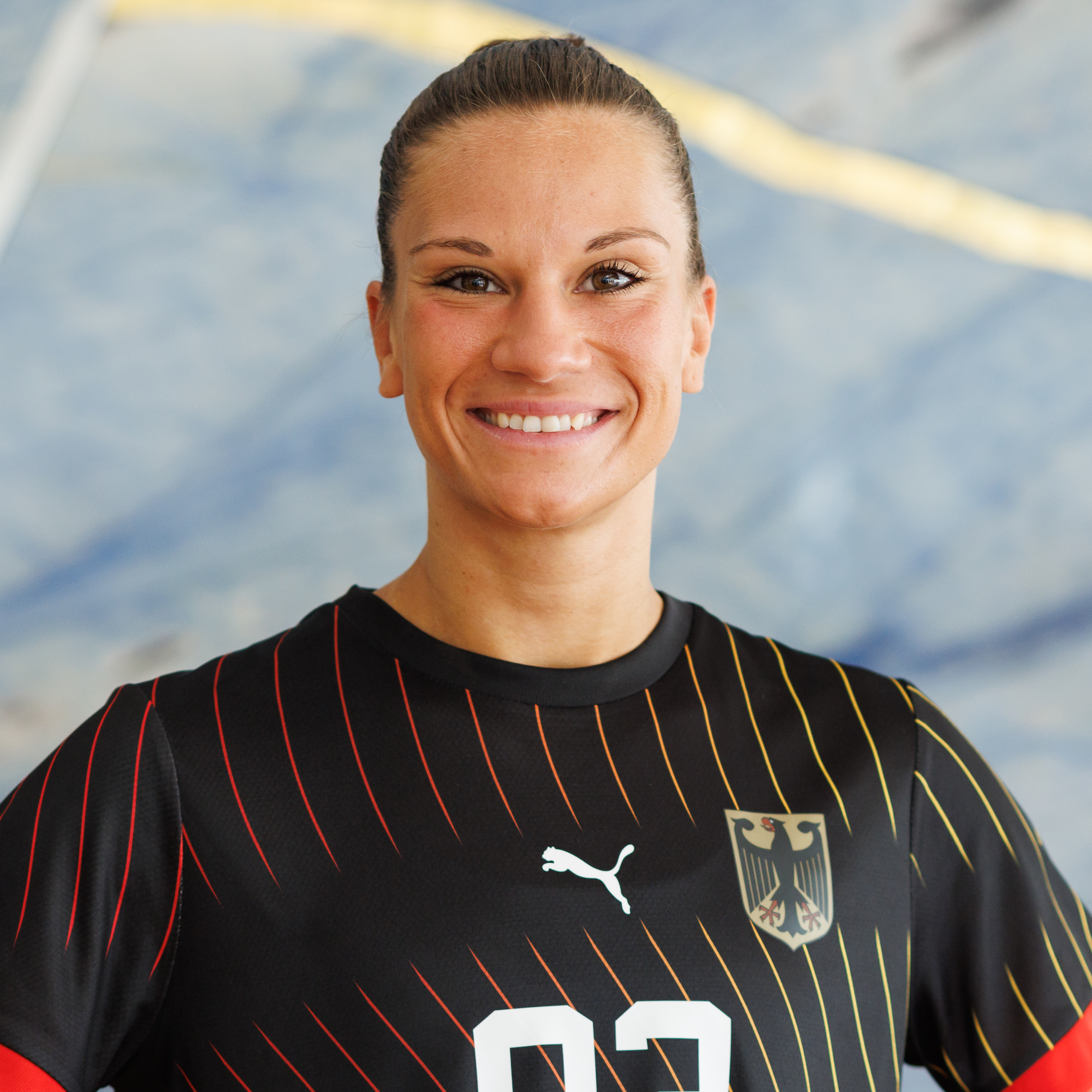
- Behnke in 2024

Personal information
- Nationality: German
- Born: 28 March 1993 (age 33) Mannheim, Germany
- Height: 1.80 m (5 ft 11 in)

Sport
- Sport: Handball
- Position: Pivot
- Current club: Ferencvárosi TC
- Number: 93

Youth career
- Years: Team
- –2011: TSG Ketsch

Senior clubs
- Years: Team
- 2010–2011: TSG Ketsch
- 2011–2014: SG BBM Bietigheim
- 2014–2019: TuS Metzingen
- 2019–2020: Rostov-Don
- 2020–2022: Ferencvárosi TC
- 2022: TuS Metzingen
National team
Years	Team	Apps	(Gls)
2013–	Germany	117	(212)
- Updated on 7 November 2024

Julia Behnke (born 28 March 1993) is a German handball player for TuS Metzingen and the German national team.
