= Kumamoto Prefectural Gymnasium =

Sports venue in Kumamoto, Japan

Coordinates: 32°48′51.45″N 130°42′6.18″E

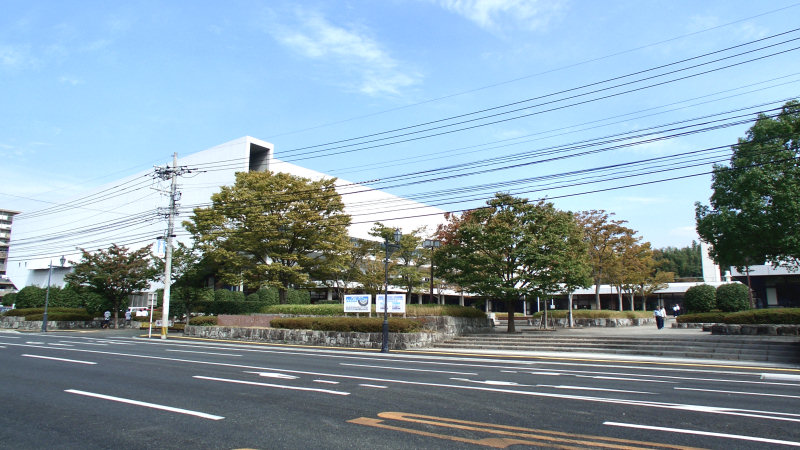
- Interactive map of Kumamoto Prefectural Gymnasium
- Location: Kumamoto, Japan
- Owner: Kumamoto Prefecture
- Operator: Kumamoto Sports Promotion Agency (KSPA)
- Capacity: 4,110
- Public transit: Kami-Kumamoto Station

Construction
- Opened: June 1982
- Builder: Kotakegumi Co.

Tenant
- Kumamoto Volters

Website
- http://www.kspa.or.jp/sougou_taiku/

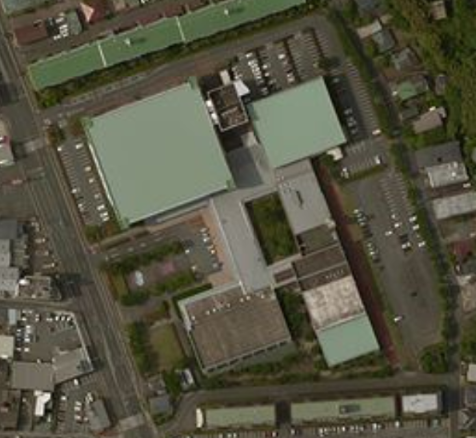
Satellite view

Kumamoto Prefectural Gymnasium (熊本県立総合体育館, Kumamoto-kenritsu Sōgō Taiikukan) is an indoor sports arena, located in Kumamoto, Japan. There are three halls and a swimming pool inside the gymnasium which is open for the public.

The main hall holds 4,110 people.

The hall hosted some of the group games for the 2007 FIVB Volleyball Women's World Cup. It also hosted some of the group games for the 2011 FIVB Volleyball Men's World Cup.
