= Minami-ku, Kumamoto =

Ward of Kumamoto City in Kyūshū, Japan

Coordinates: 32.7153°N 130.6789°E

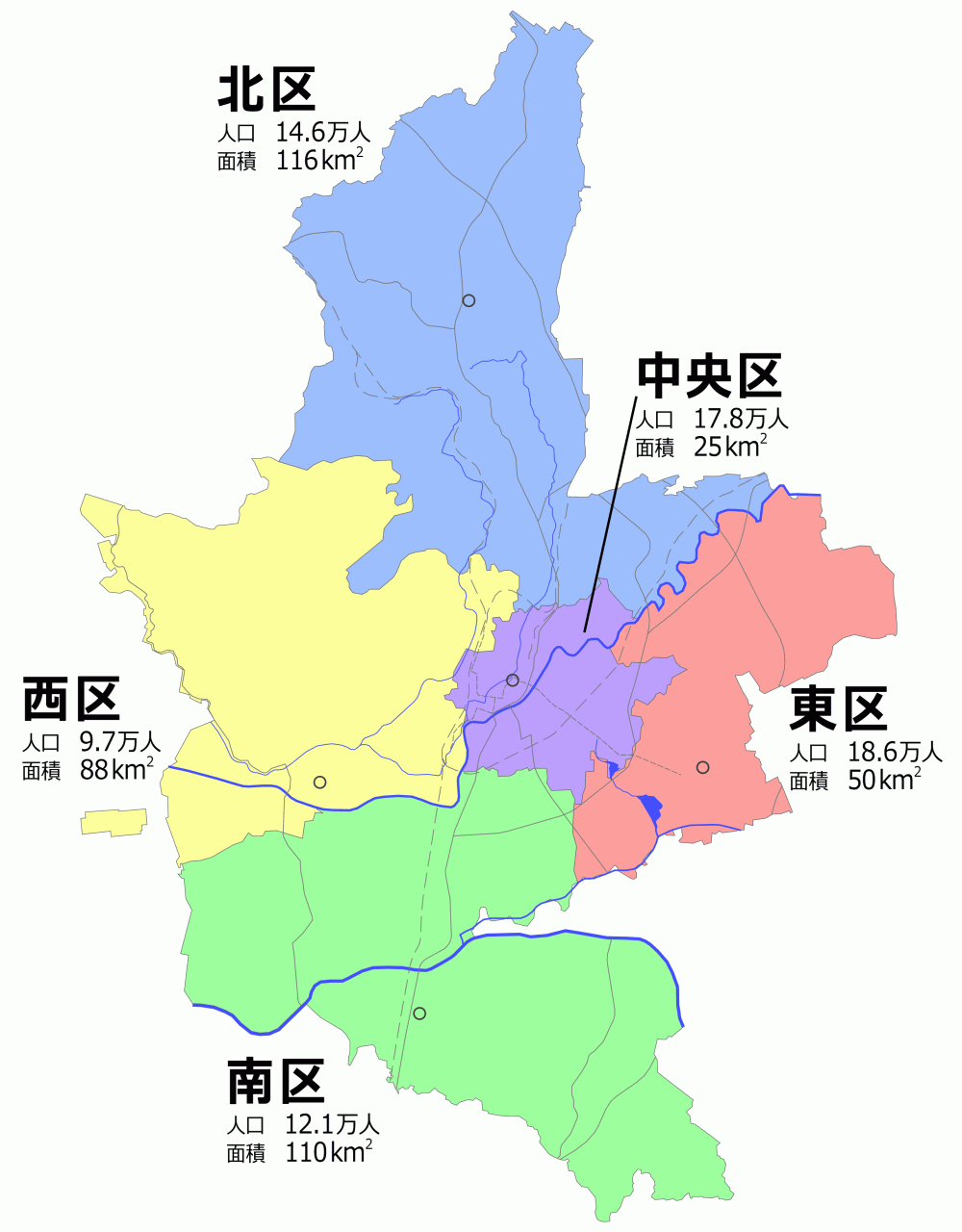
Map of Kumamoto's Wards

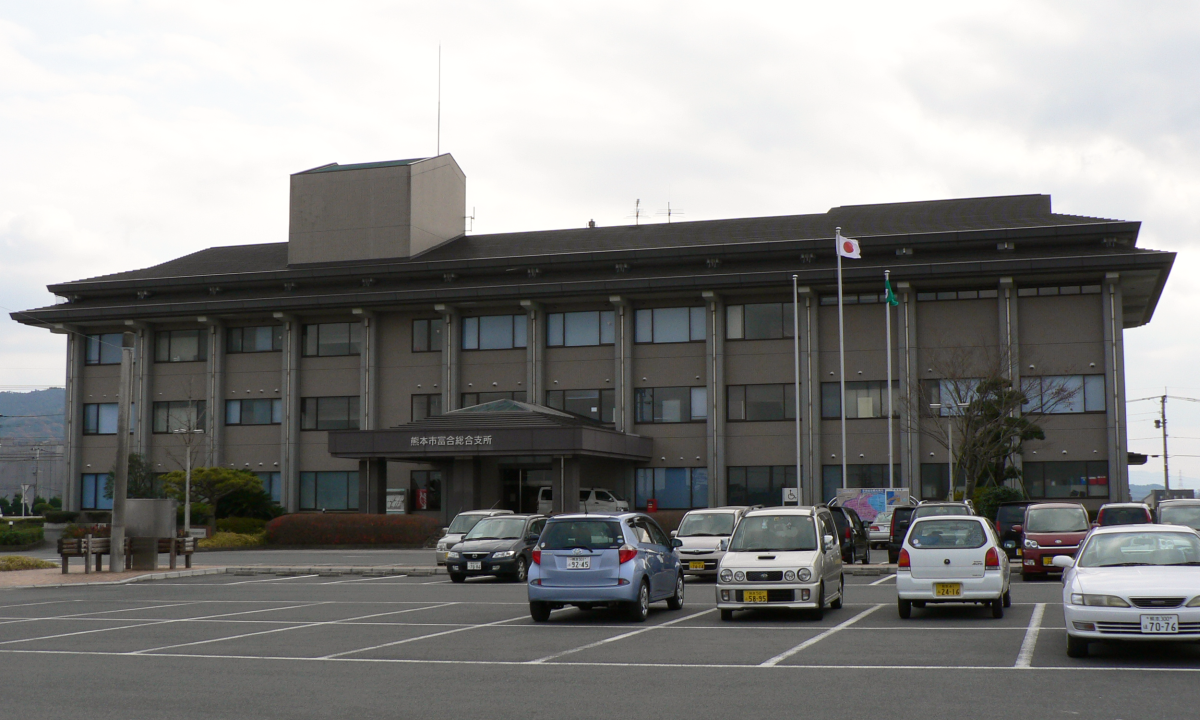
Minami ward office

Minami-ku (南区) is one of the five wards of Kumamoto City, Japan. Meaning literally "south ward," it is bordered by the Nishi-ku, Chūō-ku, Higashi-ku and also by the cities of Uki, Uto and the towns of Kashima, Mifune and Kōsa.

As of 2020, it has a population of 130,829 people and an area of 110.02 km^{2}.
