= Chūō-ku, Kumamoto =

Ward in Kumamoto City, Japan

Coordinates: 32.8033°N 130.7081°E

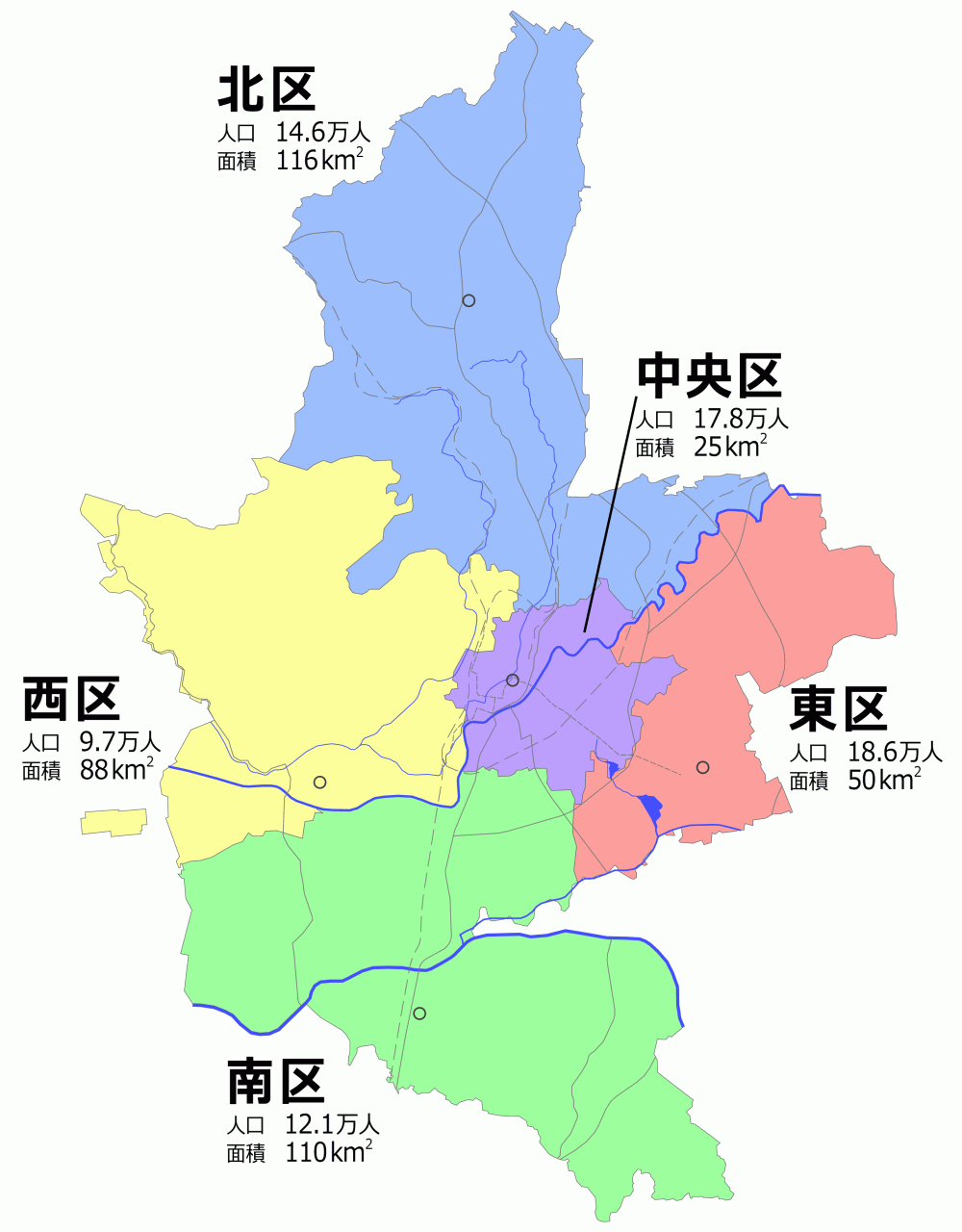
Map of Kumamoto's Wards

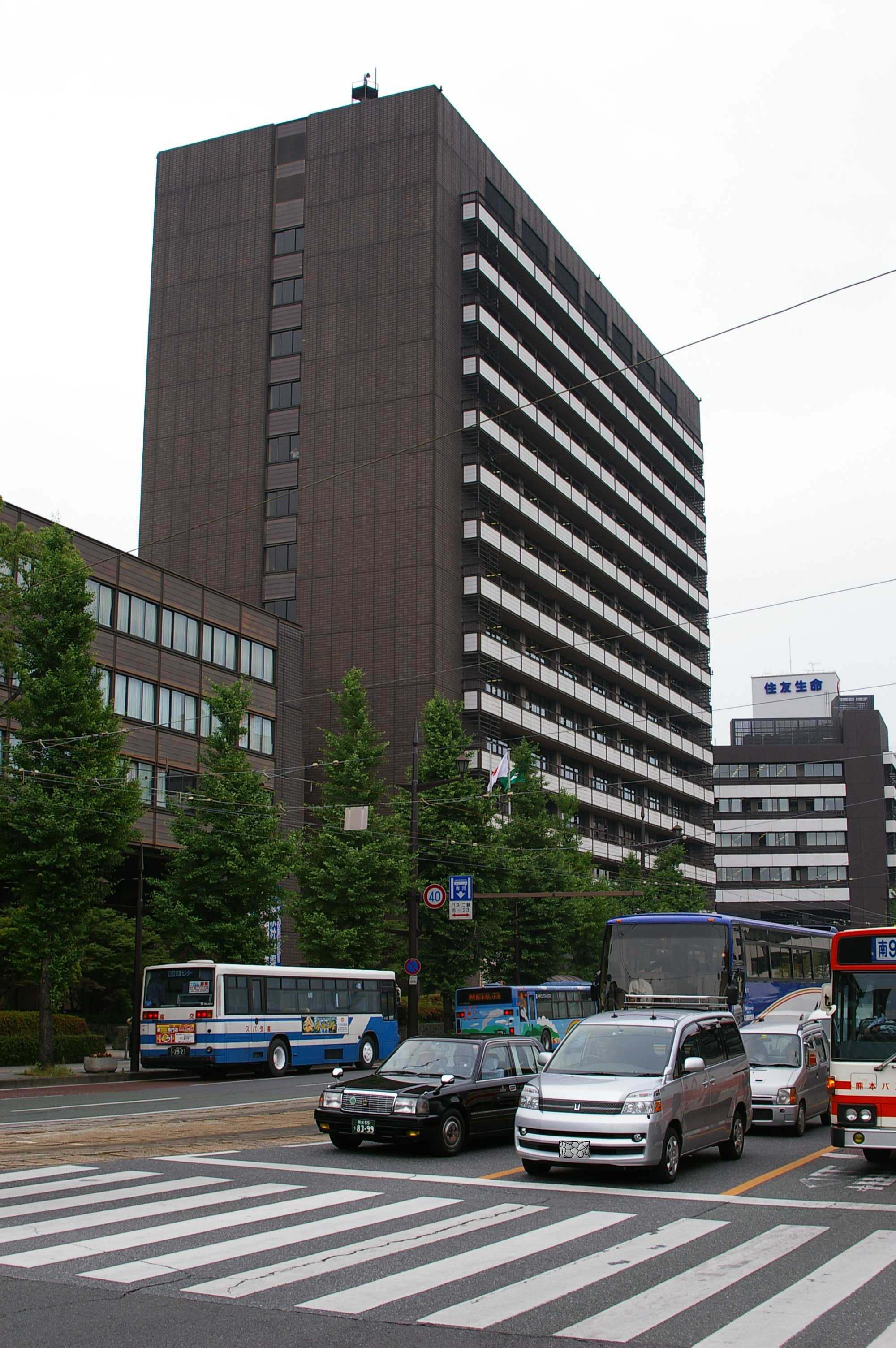
Chūō ward office is located beside the Kumamoto City Office.

Chūō-ku (中央区) is one of the five wards of Kumamoto City, Japan. The ward is located in the center of the city.

As of 2020, it has a population of 187,502 people and an area of 25.33 km^{2} (9.78 sq mi).
