= Handball at the 1976 Summer Olympics – Women's tournament =

Handball at the Olympics

1976 Women's Olympic handball tournament
Tournament details
- Host country: Canada
- Venue(s): 3 (in 3 host cities)
- Dates: 20–28 July
- Teams: 6

Final positions
- Champions: Soviet Union (1st title)
- Runners-up: East Germany
- Third place: Hungary
- Fourth place: Romania

Tournament statistics
- Matches played: 15
- Goals scored: 446 (29.73 per match)
- Top scorer(s): (Japan) Terumi Kurata (28 goals)

The women's tournament was one of two handball tournaments at the 1976 Summer Olympics. It was the first appearance of a women's handball tournament at the Olympic Games. Soviet Union won the tournament ahead of East Germany and Hungary.

The tournament was a single round robin format.

== Qualification ==
Qualification	Date	Host	Berths	Qualified
Host nation	12 May 1970	(Netherlands) Amsterdam	1	Canada
1975 World Championship	2–13 December 1975	Soviet Union	4	East Germany; Soviet Union; Hungary; Romania
Intercontinental qualification	28 June – 3 July 1976	(United States) Milwaukee	1	Japan
Total			6	

== Results ==
Pos	Team	Pld	W	D	L	GF	GA	GD	Pts
1st place, gold medalist(s)	Soviet Union	5	5	0	0	92	40	+52	10
2nd place, silver medalist(s)	East Germany	5	3	1	1	89	47	+42	7
3rd place, bronze medalist(s)	Hungary	5	3	1	1	85	55	+30	7
4	Romania	5	2	0	3	73	83	−10	4
5	Japan	5	1	0	4	72	115	−43	2
6	Canada (H)	5	0	0	5	35	106	−71	0

Source: Todor66
(H) Hosts

20 July 1976; 17:30	Hungary	25–18	Japan	Complexe sportif Claude-Robillard, Montreal
20 July 1976; 17:30	Vadász 7	(10–7)	Matsushita 6	Complexe sportif Claude-Robillard, Montreal

20 July 1976; 17:30	Soviet Union	21–3	Canada	PEPS, Quebec City
20 July 1976; 17:30	Makarets 8	(8–2)	Robert 3	PEPS, Quebec City

20 July 1976; 17:30	East Germany	18–12	Romania	Sherbrooke Sports Palace, Sherbrooke; Referees: Svensson, Christensen (DEN)
20 July 1976; 17:30	Richter 6	(11–3)	Șooș 4	Sherbrooke Sports Palace, Sherbrooke; Referees: Svensson, Christensen (DEN)

22 July 1976; 17:30	Soviet Union	14–8	Romania	Complexe sportif Claude-Robillard, Montreal; Referees: Valčić, Stanojević (YUG)
22 July 1976; 17:30	Makarets 7	(6–3)	Mikloș 3	Complexe sportif Claude-Robillard, Montreal; Referees: Valčić, Stanojević (YUG)

22 July 1976; 17:30	East Germany	24–10	Japan	PEPS, Quebec City
22 July 1976; 17:30	Richter 7	(12–3)	Matsushita 4	PEPS, Quebec City

22 July 1976; 17:30	Hungary	24–3	Canada	Sherbrooke Sports Palace, Sherbrooke
22 July 1976; 17:30	Sterbinszky 5	(11–3)	three players 1	Sherbrooke Sports Palace, Sherbrooke

24 July 1976; 17:30	East Germany	29–4	Canada	Complexe sportif Claude-Robillard, Montreal
24 July 1976; 17:30	Richter 10	(15–2)	Lemaire, Tétreault 2	Complexe sportif Claude-Robillard, Montreal

24 July 1976; 17:30	Romania	21–20	Japan	PEPS, Quebec City; Referees: Rykart, Ischer (SUI)
24 July 1976; 17:30	Arghir 5	(13–11)	Kurata 7	PEPS, Quebec City; Referees: Rykart, Ischer (SUI)

24 July 1976; 17:30	Soviet Union	12–9	Hungary	Sherbrooke Sports Palace, Sherbrooke
24 July 1976; 17:30	Turchyna 5	(5–5)	Sterbinszky 4	Sherbrooke Sports Palace, Sherbrooke

26 July 1976; 17:30	Romania	17–11	Canada	Complexe sportif Claude-Robillard, Montreal
26 July 1976; 17:30	Furcoi 4	(8–5)	Robert 4	Complexe sportif Claude-Robillard, Montreal

26 July 1976; 17:30	East Germany	7–7	Hungary	PEPS, Quebec City
26 July 1976; 17:30	Richter 3	(2–4)	Angyal 3	PEPS, Quebec City

26 July 1976; 17:30	Soviet Union	31–9	Japan	Sherbrooke Sports Palace, Sherbrooke
26 July 1976; 17:30	Shubina 7	(15–5)	Kurata 4	Sherbrooke Sports Palace, Sherbrooke

28 July 1976; 12:00	Japan	15–14	Canada	Complexe sportif Claude-Robillard, Montreal
28 July 1976; 12:00	Kurata 9	(7–11)	Lemaire, Valois 3	Complexe sportif Claude-Robillard, Montreal

28 July 1976; 13:15	Hungary	20–15	Romania	Complexe sportif Claude-Robillard, Montreal; Referees: Falk, Rosmanith (FRG)
28 July 1976; 13:15	Lelkes, Sterbinszky 5	(10–6)	Mikloș 5	Complexe sportif Claude-Robillard, Montreal; Referees: Falk, Rosmanith (FRG)

28 July 1976; 14:30	East Germany	11–14	Soviet Union	Complexe sportif Claude-Robillard, Montreal
28 July 1976; 14:30	Krause, Kretzschmar 4	(5–7)	Turchyna 7	Complexe sportif Claude-Robillard, Montreal

== Top goalscorers ==
Rank	Name	Goals
1	(Japan) Terumi Kurata	28
2	(East Germany) Kristina Richter	27
3	(Soviet Union) Tetyana Makarets	24
4	(Soviet Union) Zinaida Turchyna	22
5	(Hungary) Amália Sterbinszky	18
6	(East Germany) Roswitha Krause	16
7	(Japan) Hitomi Matsushita	15
8	(Romania) Magdalena Mikloș	14
8	(East Germany) Marion Tietz	14
10	(Romania) Maria Bosi	13
10	(Soviet Union) Lyudmyla Panchuk	13

== Team rosters ==
Canada	East Germany	Hungary	Japan	Romania	Soviet Union
Lucie Balthazar; Louise Beaumont; Francine Boulay-Parizeau; Manon Charette; Danielle Chenard; Nicole Génier; Mariette Houle; Louise Hurtubise; Denise Lemaire; Monique Prud'homme; Joanes Rail; Nicole Robert (handball player); Hélène Tétreault; Johanne Valois; Coach: Maurice Loeub	Gabriele Badorek; Hannelore Burosch; Roswitha Krause; Waltraud Kretzschmar; Evelyn Matz; Liane Michaelis; Eva Paskuy; Kristina Richter; Christina Rost; Silvia Siefert; Marion Tietz; Petra Uhlig; Christina Voß; Hannelore Zober; Coach: Peter Kretzschmar	Éva Angyal (Vasas SC); Mária Berzsenyi (FTC); Ágota Bujdosó (Vasas SC); Klára Csík (Vasas SC); Zsuzsanna Kézi (TBSC); Katalin Laki (Bakony Vegyész); Rozália Lelkes (FTC); Márta Megyeri (Csepel SC); Ilona Nagy (Csepel SC); Marianna Nagy (TFSE); Erzsébet Németh (FTC); Amália Sterbinszky (Vasas SC); Borbála Tóth Harsányi (Bakony Vegyész); Mária Vadász (Vasas SC); Coach: Bódog Török	Mihoko Hozumi; Mikiko Kato; Eiko Kawada; Nanami Kino; Kuriko Komori; Hiroko Kosahara; Tokuko Kubo; Terumi Kurata; Hitomi Matsushita; Natsue Shimada; Shoko Wada; Emiko Yamashita; Coach: Kaoru Ie	Simona Arghir; Maria Bosi; Doina Cojocaru; Doina Furcoi; Iuliana Hobincu; Elisabeta Ionescu; Viorica Ionică; Maria Lackovics; Georgeta Lăcusta; Magdalena Mikloș; Cristina Petrovici; Constantina Pițigoi; Niculina Sasu; Rozalia Șooș; Coach: Constantin Popescu	Lyubov Berezhnaya; Lyudmyla Bobrus; Aldona Česaitytė; Tetyana Hlushchenko; Larysa Karlova; Mariya Litoshenko; Nina Lobova; Tetyana Makarets; Lyudmyla Panchuk; Rafiga Shabanova; Nataliya Sherstyuk; Lyudmila Shubina; Zinaida Turchyna; Halyna Zakharova; Coach: Igor Turchyn
