= Piddubny Olympic College =

Sports school in Kyiv, Ukraine

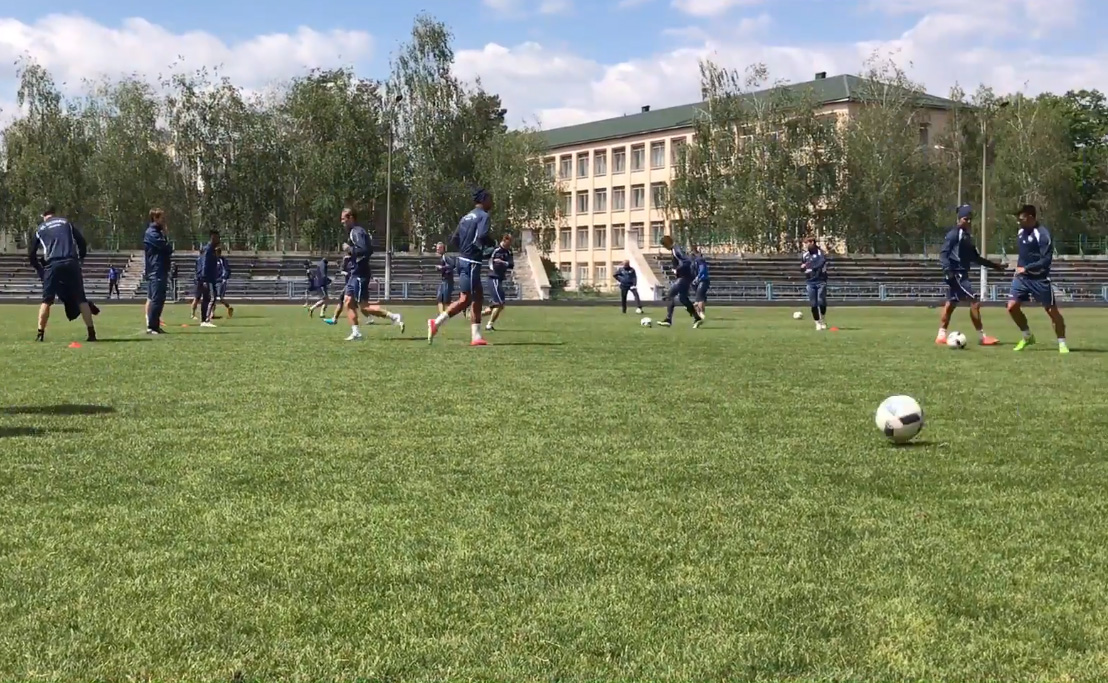
College stadium (Olimpik training section)

Piddubny Olympic College (Ukrainian: Олімпійський коледж імені Івана Піддубного, romanized: Olimpiyskyi koledzh imeni Ivana Piddubnoho) is a sports school in Kyiv that provides sports reserve for Olympic sports. The college also has a combined boarding middle and high school. Upon successful completion, a college graduate of the school receives an undergraduate diploma in "Physical development and sport".

== History ==
The college was created in 1966 by the Cabinet of Ministers of Ukraine as the Republican College of Physical Culture (Ukrainian: Республіканське вище училище фізичної культури, Respublikanske vyshche uchylyshche fizychnoyi kultury) also known as RVUFK. On 24 July 2015 it was renamed to Piddubny Olympic College. The college has two specialized halls for fencing, small sports halls for light athletics and football, a swimming pool, five football fields, a specialized hall for sports gymnastics, a specialized hall for wrestling, five indoor tennis courts. There are also two dormitory buildings, two dining halls, main learning building, medical department, library, computer room, laundry room, auto parking, and warehouses.

== Section establishment ==
- 1966 — Gymnastics (artistic), Athletics, Association football, Fencing
- 1967 — Swimming
- 1986 — Synchronized swimming
- 2002 — Cycling
- 2004 — Freestyle wrestling, Judo, Boxing
- 2011 — Rowing, Ice hockey
- 2015 — Shooting (bullseye)
- 2017 — Greco-Roman wrestling
- 2023 — Beach volleyball, Table tennis
- 2025 — Modern pentathlon

== Football section ==
The football team of the college is a member of the Kyiv City Football Federation, a regional federation of the Football Federation of Ukraine. Its football team participates in championships of both Kyiv City and Kyiv Oblast football federations.

At the 2015 Makarov Memorial Tournament, the college football team participated under the name of CSKA Kyiv.

== Notable alumni ==
=== Olympic champions ===
- Tetyana Kocherhina, handball player, champion of the Summer Olympic Games
- Tetyana Hlushchenko, handball player, champion of the Summer Olympic Games
- Olha Zubaryeva, handball player, champion of the Summer Olympic Games
- Larysa Karlova, handball player, champion of the Summer Olympic Games
- Iryna Palchykova, handball player, champion of the Summer Olympic Games
- Lyudmyla Panchuk, handball player, champion of the Summer Olympic Games
- Nataliya Tymoshkina, handball player, champion of the Summer Olympic Games
- Mykhaylo Ishchenko, handball player, champion of the Summer Olympic Games
- Yuriy Lahutyn, handball player, champion of the Summer Olympic Games
- Alexander Belostenny, basketball player, champion of the Summer Olympic Games
- Natalya Klimova, basketball player, champion of the Summer Olympic Games
- Yury Panchenko, volleyball player, champion of the Summer Olympic Games
- Serhiy Krasyuk, swimmer, champion of the Summer Olympic Games
- Stella Zakharova, gymnast, champion of the Summer Olympic Games
- Vladimir Tatarchuk, football player, champion of the Summer Olympic Games
- Oleksandra Tymoshenko, rhythmic gymnast, champion of the Summer Olympic Games
- Tatiana Lysenko, gymnast, champion of the Summer Olympic Games
- Vadym Gutzeit, fencer, champion of the Summer Olympic Games
- Oleg Verniaiev, gymnast, champion of the Summer Olympic Games
- Yuliya Bakastova, fencer, champion of the Summer Olympic Games

=== Olympic runners-up ===
- Oleksandr Svitlychnyi, gymnast, silver medal recipient of the Summer Olympic Games
- Ruslan Mezentsev, gymnast, silver medal recipient of the Summer Olympic Games
- Roman Zozulya, gymnast, silver medal recipient of the Summer Olympic Games
- Liliya Osadcha, volleyball player, silver medal recipient of the Summer Olympic Games
- Roman Hontyuk, judoka, silver medal recipient of the Summer Olympic Games
- Valeriy Pereshkura, gymnast, silver medal recipient of the Summer Olympic Games
- Oksana Skaldina, rhythmic gymnast, bronze medal recipient of the Summer Olympic Games
- Anna Bessonova, rhythmic gymnast, bronze medal recipient of the Summer Olympic Games
- Oleh Kosyak, gymnast, bronze medal recipient of the Summer Olympic Games
- Volodymyr Shamenko, gymnast, bronze medal recipient of the Summer Olympic Games
- Nataliya Pyhyda, sprinter, bronze medal recipient of the Summer Olympic Games
- Yelyzaveta Bryzghina, sprinter, bronze medal recipient of the Summer Olympic Games
- Vladimir Tkachenko, basketball player, bronze medal recipient of the Summer Olympic Games
- Oleksandr Bahach, shot putter, bronze medal recipient of the Summer Olympic Games
- Vladyslav Tretiak, fencer, bronze medal recipient of the Summer Olympic Games
- Nataliia Mytriuk, handball player, bronze medal recipient of the Summer Olympic Games
- Hanna Rizatdinova, rhythmic gymnast, bronze medal recipient of the Summer Olympic Games

=== Other athletes ===
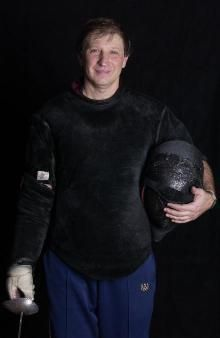
Yury Gelman

- Yury Gelman (born 1955), Ukrainian-born American Olympic fencing coach
- Denys Harmash (born 1990), professional football midfielder
- Andriy Totovytskyi (born 1993), professional football midfielder
- Dmytro Kulyk (born 2001), professional football forward
- Iryna Rudnytska (born 1979), former Olympic synchronized swimmer
- Yuriy Solovyenko (born 1971), professional football defender and coach

== See also ==
- National University of Physical Education and Sport of Ukraine
- Ivan Piddubny, Ukrainian athlete of the Russian Empire and the Soviet Union
- FC CSKA Kyiv
