= Handball at the 1976 Summer Olympics – Women's qualification =

The qualification for the 1976 Women's Olympic Handball Tournament assigned quota places to six teams: the host, four teams from the world championships and one team from the qualification tournament respectively.

== Qualification ==
Qualification	Date	Host	Berths	Qualified
Host nation	12 May 1970	(Netherlands) Amsterdam	1	Canada
1975 World Championship	2–13 December 1975	Soviet Union	4	East Germany; Soviet Union; Hungary; Romania
Intercontinental qualification	28 June – 3 July 1976	(United States) Milwaukee	1	Japan
Total			6	

== Modus ==
The IHF proposed that the host and the top five from the last world championships (WC) would qualify. The USA proposed that besides the host only the top four from the WC would qualify. The last spot would be given to the winner of an additional tournament. At this tournament, the champions from Africa, America, and Asia would attend. Finland proposed that the sixth place would be given to the winner of a game between the 5th place team at the WC and the winner of a tournament between the champions from Africa, America, and Asia.

France presented the following arguments for the American proposal:

- The Olympic thought is that all continents are represented
- It would be great propaganda for handball on these continents
- It's not technical risk. Because the level of Japan is good enough and they would most likely win the qualification tournament.

The proposal from the USA received 25 votes, from Finland 12 votes, and the proposal from the IHF 10 votes.

== Legend for qualification type ==
Qualified
Key	From	To
	World Championship	Olympic Tournament
	World Championship	Qualification Tournament

== World Championship ==
Rank	Team
1st place, gold medalist(s)	East Germany
2nd place, silver medalist(s)	Soviet Union
3rd place, bronze medalist(s)	Hungary
4	Romania
5	Yugoslavia
6	Czechoslovakia
7	Poland
8	Norway
9	Denmark
10	Japan
11	United States
12	Tunisia

== Qualification tournament ==
Qualification tournament
Tournament details
- Host country: United States
- Venue(s): 1 (in 1 host city)
- Dates: 28 June – 3 July 1976
- Teams: 3 (from 3 confederations)

Tournament statistics
- Matches played: 6
- Goals scored: 182 (30.33 per match)

The 1976 IHF Olympic qualification tournament was held in the United States. The winner of the tournament qualified for the 1976 Summer Olympics. Japan represented Asia, Tunisia represented Africa and the United States represented America.

=== Qualification ===
Qualification	Date	Host	Berths	Qualified
1975 World Championship – Asian qualification			1	Japan
1976 African Championship	18. April 1976	Algeria	1	Tunisia
American representative			1	United States
Total			3	

=== Standings ===
Pos	Team	Pld	W	D	L	GF	GA	GD	Pts	Qualification
1	Japan	4	4	0	0	80	46	+34	8	1976 Summer Olympics
2	United States (H)	4	2	0	2	64	63	+1	4	
3	Tunisia	4	0	0	4	38	73	−35	0	

Source: www.todor66.com
Rules for classification: 1) Points; 2) Head-to-head points; 3) Head-to-head goal difference; 4) Head-to-head goals scored; 5) Goal difference; 6) Goals scored; 7) Draw.
(H) Hosts

=== Matches ===
All times are local (UTC-5).

28 June 1976	United States	13–8	Tunisia	Whitefish Bay Field House, Milwaukee
28 June 1976		(6–6)		Whitefish Bay Field House, Milwaukee

29 June 1976	Japan	20–9	Tunisia	Whitefish Bay Field House, Milwaukee
29 June 1976		(11–3)		Whitefish Bay Field House, Milwaukee

30 June 1976; 21:00	United States	17–23	Japan	Whitefish Bay Field House, Milwaukee
30 June 1976; 21:00		(7–12)	Kurata & Shimada 6	Whitefish Bay Field House, Milwaukee

1 July 1976	Tunisia	13–22	United States	Whitefish Bay Field House, Milwaukee
1 July 1976		(8–10)	Lillis 8	Whitefish Bay Field House, Milwaukee

2 July 1976	Tunisia	8–18	Japan	Whitefish Bay Field House, Milwaukee
2 July 1976		(7–9)		Whitefish Bay Field House, Milwaukee

3 July 1976; 19:00	Japan	19–12	United States	Whitefish Bay Field House, Milwaukee
3 July 1976; 19:00		(11-6)		Whitefish Bay Field House, Milwaukee
