= Eiko =

- Pronunciation: Eiko
- Gender: Feminine with short o; masculine with long ō

Origin
- Origin: Japanese
- Region of origin: Japanese

Eiko is a feminine Japanese given name. Eikō, also spelled Eikou or Eikoh, is a masculine Japanese given name. The meanings of these names depend on the kanji used to write them.

== Kanji ==
In the feminine name Eiko, "ko" is generally written with a kanji meaning "child" (子), while "Ei" may be written in a wide variety of ways with either a single kanji read "ei" or two kanji read "e" and "i", including:

- 永子 (first kanji meaning "eternity")
- 栄子 (first kanji meaning "glory" or "honour")
- 英子 (first kanji meaning "flower" or "outstanding")
- 瑛子 (first kanji meaning "lustre" or "crystal")
- 江威子 (first kanji meaning "river", second meaning "power")

In the masculine name Eikō, both "Ei" and "kō" may be written with many different kanji, including:

- 英公 ("outstanding", "duke")
- 栄光 ("glory", "light")

== People ==
Notable people with the name Eiko include:

- Eiko Ando (安藤 永子; 1934–2018), Japanese-American actress
- Eiko Goshi (合志 えい子; born 1954), Japanese former freestyle swimmer
- Eiko Hirashima (平島 栄子; born 1950), Japanese gymnast
- Eiko Ikegami (池上 英子; born 1950), Japanese academic, author and historian
- Eiko Ishibashi (石橋 英子; born 1974), Japanese singer-songwriter and musician
- Eiko Ishioka (石岡 瑛子; 1938–2012), Japanese art director, costume and graphic designer
- Eiko Kadono (角野 栄子; born 1935), Japanese author of children's literature
- Eiko Kakehata (欠端 瑛子; born 1993), Japanese goalball player
- Eiko Kawada (河田 栄子; born 1955), Japanese handball player
- Eiko Kawashima (川島 栄子; born 1961), Japanese pop singer better known as Anri
- Eiko Kimura (木村 英子; born 1965), Japanese politician
- Eiko Koike (小池 栄子; born 1980), Japanese actress
- Eiko Koizumi (小泉 栄子; born 1973), Japanese beach volleyball player
- Eiko Masuyama (増山 江威子; born 1936), Japanese voice actress
- Eiko Matsuda (松田 暎子; 1952–2011), Japanese actress
- Eiko Matsumura (松村 栄子; born 1961), Japanese novelist
- Eiko Minami (南 栄子; 1909–?), Japanese dancer
- Eiko Nagashima (永島 暎子; born 1955), Japanese actress
- Eiko Nakayama (中山 英子; born 1970), Japanese skeleton racer
- Eiko Otake (born 1948), Japanese artist, member of the performing duo Eiko & Koma
- Eiko Segawa (瀬川 瑛子; born 1948), Japanese enka singer
- Eiko Shimamiya (島宮 えい子; born 1965), Japanese pop singer
- Eiko Takahashi (高橋 栄子; born 1945), Japanese former swimmer
- Eiko Tanaka (田中 栄子), Japanese businesswoman who founded animation studio STUDIO4°C in 1989
- Eiko Wada (和田 映子; born 1939), Japanese swimmer
- Eiko Yamada (山田 栄子; born 1953), Japanese actress and voice actress
- Eiko Yamazawa (山沢 栄子; 1899–1995), Japanese photographer
- Eiko Yanami (八並 映子; 1948–2017), Japanese actress

Notable people with the name Eikō include:

- Eikō Harada (原田 泳幸; born 1948), Japanese business executive
- Eikoh Hosoe (細江 英公; born 1933), Japanese photographer and filmmaker
- Eiko Kaneta (金田 英行; 1942–2022), Japanese politician
- Eikō Kano (狩野 英孝; born 1982), Japanese comedian and singer

== Fictional characters ==
- Eiko Carol, a character in the video game Final Fantasy IX
- Eiko Aizawa, a character in the manga and anime Shinryaku! Ika Musume
- Eiko Tokura in manga and anime "Slow Start"
- Eiko Magami in Project A-ko
- Eiko in Terminator Zero

Eiko is also an Estonian male given name.

== See also ==
- Young-ja, Korean female name written with the same characters
