= Azerbaijan Sport Academy =

- Azərbaycan İdman Akademiyası
- Type: Public
- Established: 1930
- Rector: Fuad Hajiyev
- Location: Fatali Khan Khoyski avenue 98, AZ 1072, Baku, Azerbaijan
- Website: https://sport.edu.az/en/

Azerbaijan Sport Academy, founded in 1930, is a higher education institution in Azerbaijan.

== History ==
=== USSR period (1930–1991) ===
- Transcaucasian State Institute of Physical Culture (1930–1936) – As the first sports high school of Transcaucasia, it started its activities in Baku.
- Azerbaijan State Institute of Physical Education (1936–1999) – In 1936, the high school started to continue its activities as the Azerbaijan State Physical Training Institute. This change was calculated to rebuild the work of the institute, increase the national teaching staff, determine the direction of scientific research and enable more young Azerbaijanis to receive higher sports education.

=== Years of independence (1991) ===
- Azerbaijan State Physical Education and Sports Academy (1999–2023) - After the Republic of Azerbaijan gained independence, the Azerbaijan State Institute of Physical Education, like other higher education institutions, began to establish its activities at the level of the requirements of the age.
- Azerbaijan Sport Academy (2023)- In 2023, the university was restructured and renamed Azərbaycan İdman Akademiyası (Azerbaijan Sports Academy).

== Notable alumni ==
- Inna Ryskal (born 1944), a volleyball player who won two gold medals and two bronze medals, and competed in four Olympic Games
- Rafiga Shabanova (born 1943), handball player who won gold at the 1976 Olympics
- Lyudmila Shubina (born 1948), a handball player who won gold at the 1976 Olympics
- Ilgar Mammadov (born 1965), fencer who won gold at two Olympic Games (1988, 1996) and one World Championships (1989), as well as silver at one World Championship (1995)
- Igor Ponomaryov (born 1960), football player
- Boris Koretsky (born 1961), fencer who won gold at the 1988 Olympics
- Valery Belenki (born 1969), gymnast who competed in two Olympic Games and six World Championships
- Nazim Huseynov (born 1969), judoka who won gold at the 1992 Olympics and silver at the 1993 World Championships
- Khazar Isayev (born 1963), wrestler who won gold at the 1986 World Championships and silver at the 1987 World Championships
- Rovshan Huseynov (born 1975), boxer who won gold at the 1994 World Championships
- Telman Pashayev (born 1953), wrestler who won silver at the 1975 World Championships
- Rafig Hajiyev (born 1946), wrestler who won silver at the 1974 World Championships
- Ali Aliyev (born 1937), wrestler who won gold at five World Championships (1959, 1961, 1962, 1966, 1967)

More than 15,000 specialists have graduated from the school.

== Composition ==
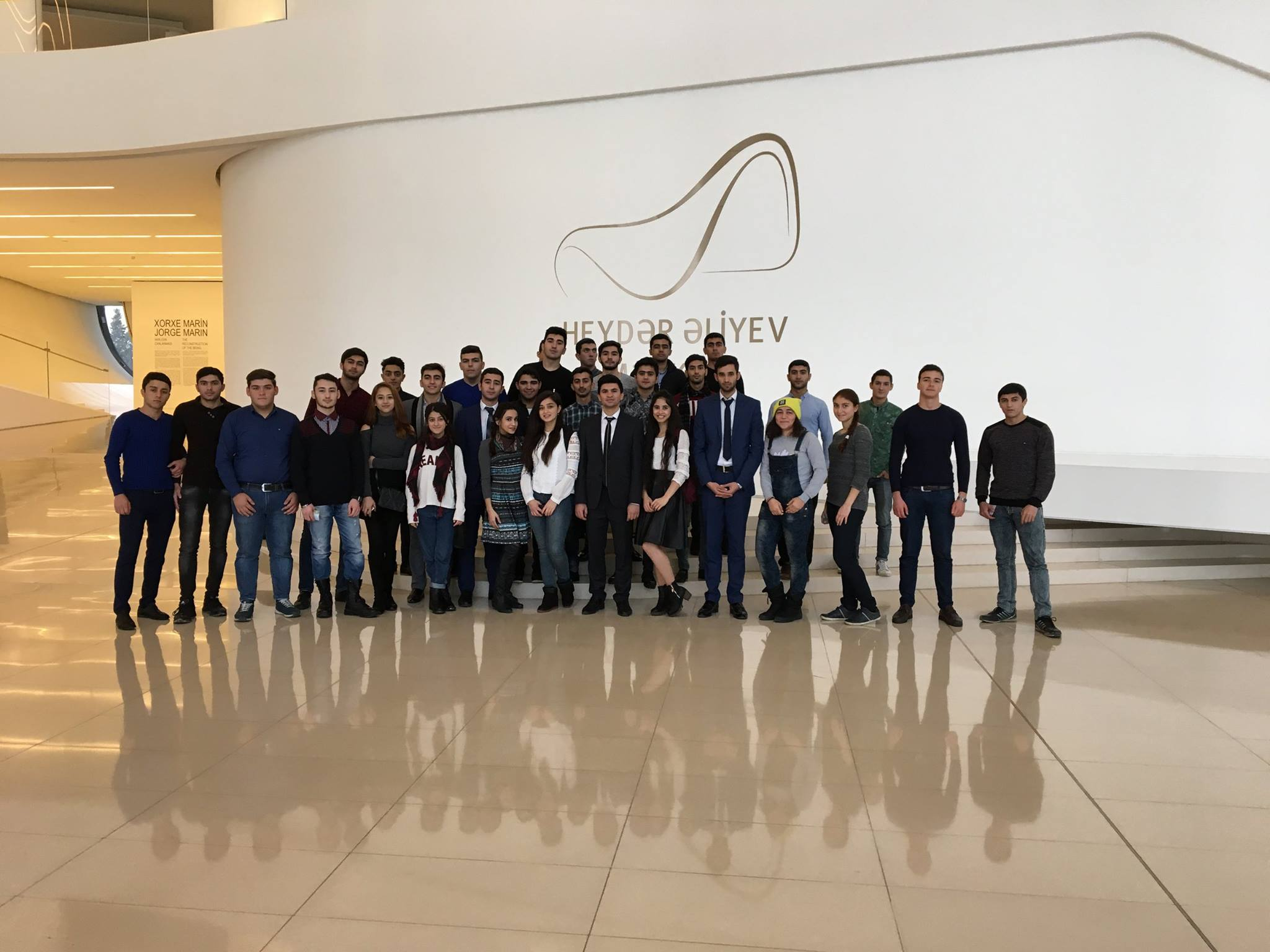
Members of the Student Youth Organization of the Sports Academy at the Heydar Aliyev Center.

The Youth Organization (YTO) was founded on 30 May 2005. The organization's first president was Yusif Babanlı. YTO members benefit from TGRT's opportunities and become department heads, club presidents, designers, teachers, photographers, etc. They can try themselves in professions.

== Faculties and institutes ==
1. Adaptive Physical Education
2. Mass Recreational Sports
3. General Physical Training
4. Physical Education and Pre-Military Training Teaching
5. Coaching
6. Rehabilitation in Physical Education and Sports
7. Sports Management and Communication

== Rectors ==
- S.G. Aliyev (1946–1950)
- A.J. Babayev (1950–1972)
- V.V. Ananayev (1972–1974)
- R.A. Rajabov (1974–1980)
- S.H. Novruzov (1980–1987)
- A.G. Abiyev (1987–2015)
- F.H. Hajiyev (2015–present)

== See also ==
- Baku State University
- Azerbaijan State Oil and Industry University
- Azerbaijan State Pedagogical University
