= Komori (disambiguation) =

Komori is a Japanese company. Komori may also refer to

- Komori (surname)
- Komori Dam (Mie) in Mie Prefecture, Japan
- Pheidole komori, a species of ant
- Komori-san Can't Decline, a Japanese manga
- Komori Seikatsu Kojo Club, a 2008 Japanese film
- The Komori ninja in Usagi Yojimbo
