= 松下 =

松下, meaning 'under the loose', may refer to:

- Matsushita, Japanese transliteration
- Songxia, Changle, Fuzhou, Fujian, China
