= Kuriko =

- Gender: Female
- Language: Japanese

Origin
- Origin: Japanese
- Region of origin: Japan

Kuriko is a feminine Japanese given name. Notable people with the name include:

- Kuriko Komori (小森 久里子; born 1954), Japanese handball player
- Kuriko Namino (波乃 久里子; born 1945), Japanese actress
