= Galina Zakharova =

Galina Zakharova may refer to:

- Galina Zakharova (runner) (born 1956), Soviet distance runner
- Halyna Zakharova (born 1947), Soviet handball player
