= Eiko (disambiguation) =

EIKO or Eiko may refer to:

- Eiko and Eikō, Japanese given names
- Execution of Imam Khomeini's Order (EIKO), a state-owned enterprise in Iran
- Eiko Film GmbH, a 1920s company bought by Terra Film

== See also ==
- Eiko & Koma, a Japanese performance duo
