= Valois =

Valois may refer to:

== People ==
- House of Valois, French royal house descended from the counts of Valois
- Agnès-Marie Valois (1914–2018), French religious sister and nurse
- Charles-Omer Valois (born 1924), Canadian Catholic bishop
- Ève Valois (1963–2000), known professionally as Lolo Ferrari, French adult entertainer
- Georges Valois (1878–1945), French journalist and politician
- Henri Valois (1607–1692), French classical historian
- Jean-Louis Valois (born 1973), French footballer
- Johanne Valois (born 1953), Canadian handball player
- Jonathan Valois (born 1971), Canadian politician
- Joseph Valois (1767–1835), businessman, farmer and political figure in Lower Canada
- Léonise Valois (1868–1936), French-Canadian poet
- Luislinda Valois (born 1942), Salvadoran-born Brazilian jurist, magistrate and politician
- Michel-François Valois (1801–1869), physician and political figure in Canada East
- Noël Valois (1855–1915), French historian
- Philippe Valois (1907–1986), Canadian politician
- Victor Valois (1841–1924), German Imperial Navy vice-admiral

== Places ==
- County, later Duchy, of Valois, France, governed by the counts and dukes of Valois
- Valois, New York, a hamlet north of Hector in Schuyler County
- Valois, Pointe-Claire, Quebec, Canada, a neighbourhood in the city of Pointe-Claire
  - Valois station, a commuter rail station

== Other uses ==
- Rue de Valois, a street in Paris
- Valois sauce, a variation of Béarnaise sauce
