= Nicole Robert =

Nicole Robert may refer to:

- Nicole Robert (handballer), Canadian handball player
- Nicole Robert (producer), Canadian film producer
