= Mihoko =

- Gender: Female

Origin
- Origin: Japanese
- Meaning: Different meanings depending on the kanji used

Mihoko (written: 美保子, 三保子 or 視穂子) is a feminine Japanese given name. Notable people with the name include:

- Mihoko Fujimura (藤村 実穂子; born 1966), Japanese operatic mezzo-soprano
- Mihoko Higuchi (樋口 美穂子; born 1969), Japanese figure skating coach, choreographer, and former competitive figure skater
- Mihoko Hozumi (穂積 美保子; born 1955), Japanese handball player
- Mihoko Ishida (石田ミホコ; born 1982), Japanese retired footballer
- Mihoko Iwasa (岩佐 美帆子; born 2005), Japanese women's professional shogi player
- Mihoko Iwaya (岩屋 美保子; born 1964), Japanese former football player
- Mihoko Otsue (大杖 美保子; born 1946), Japanese alpine skier
- Mihoko Yama (山 三保子; born 1949), Japanese high jumper
