= Kurata =

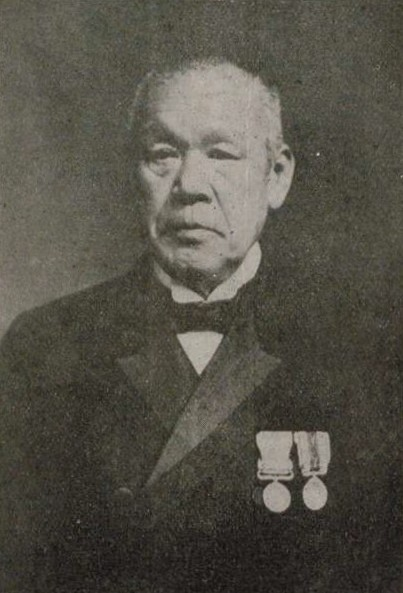
Unpei Kurata

Kurata (written: 蔵田 or 倉田) is a Japanese surname. Notable people with the surname include:

- Hideyuki Kurata, writer
- Hyakuzō Kurata, writer
- Kazuhiko Kurata (蔵田 和彦, born 1967), Japanese rower
- Kogoro Kurata, designer of the Kuratas mecha
- Masayo Kurata, voice actor
- Satoru Kurata (1922–1978), botanist
- Seiji Kurata, photographer
- Shigeo Kurata, botanist
- Shirley Kurata, Japanese American wardrobe stylist and costume designer
- Shu Kurata, footballer
- Terumi Kurata (蔵田 照美, born 1951), Japanese handball player
- Tetsuo Kurata, actor
- Yasuaki Kurata, actor known as David Kurata

== Fictional characters ==
- Akihiro Kurata, a character in the anime series Digimon Data Squad
- Atsushi Kurata, a character in the manga series Hikaru no Go
- Yui Kurata, a character in the manga series Trinity Seven
- Sana Kurata, a character in the manga series Kodomo no Omocha
- Sayuri Kurata, character in the visual novel Kanon
- Mashiro Kurata, a character in the rhythm game BanG Dream!
