= Georgeta =

Georgeta is a Romanian feminine given name. Notable people with the name include:

- Georgeta Damian, Romanian rower
- Georgeta Gabor, Romanian artistic gymnast
- Georgeta Hurmuzachi, Romanian artistic gymnast
- Georgeta Lăcusta
- Georgeta Stoleriu
