= Nicolești =

Nicolești may refer to several villages in Romania:

- Nicolești, a depopulated village in Berteștii de Jos Commune, Brăila County
- Nicolești, a village in Puiești Commune, Buzău County
- Nicolești, a village in Frumoasa Commune, Harghita County
- Nicolești, a village in Ulieș Commune, Harghita County
- Nicolești, a village in Miloșești Commune, Ialomița County
- Nicolești, a village in Crăciunești Commune, Mureș County
- Nicolești, a village in Olanu Commune, Vâlcea County
