= Christina Voß =

German handball player (born 1952)

Olympic medal record

Women's handball
Silver medal – second place	1976 Montreal	Team

World Championship
Gold medal – first place	1975 Soviet Union	

Christina Voß (née Lange, born 7 July 1952 in Perleberg, East Germany) is a former East German handball player who won the 1975 World Championship. She also competed in the 1976 Summer Olympics.

In 1976 she won the silver medal with the East German team. She played all five matches and scored six goals. For that she was awarded the DDR Patriotic Order of Merit in bronze.

In total she played 79 matches for the East Germany national team.

At club level she played for SC Empor Rostock from 1971 to 1983.
