= Rozalia Șooș =

Romanian handball player (born 1947)

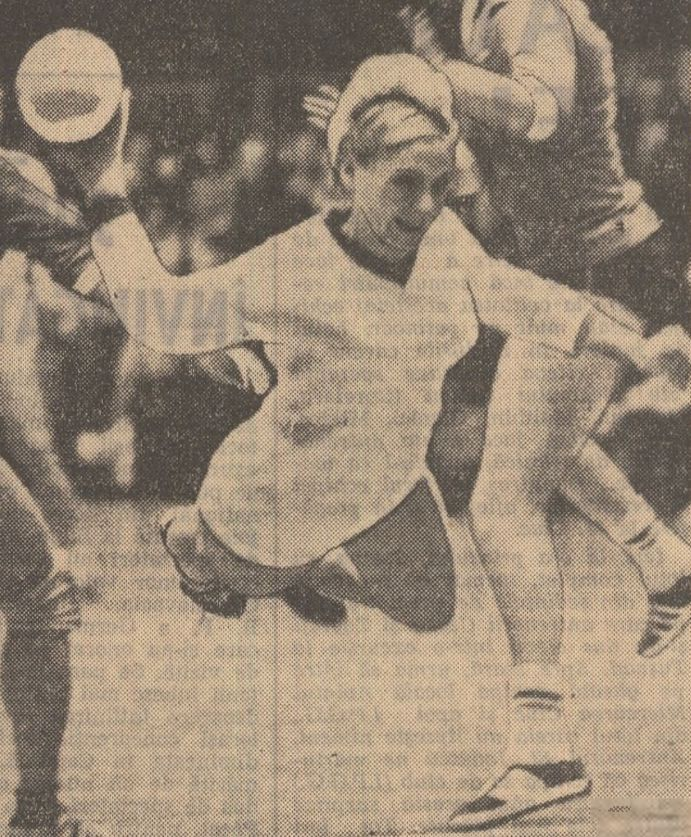
Rozalia Şooş

Rozalia Şooş, also known as Rozalia Șoș (Hungarian: Soós Rozália) (born February 1, 1947, in Târgu Mureş, Romania) is a former Romanian handball player who competed in the 1976 Summer Olympics.

She was part of the Romanian handball team, which finished fourth in the Olympic tournament. She played four matches and scored nine goals.
