= Denise Lemaire =

Canadian handball player (born 1956)

Denise Lemaire (born November 5, 1956, in Iberville, Quebec) is a former Canadian handball player who competed in the 1976 Summer Olympics.

She was part of the Canadian handball team, which finished sixth in the Olympic tournament. She played four matches and scored seven goals.
