= Kristina Richter =

German handball player (born 1946)

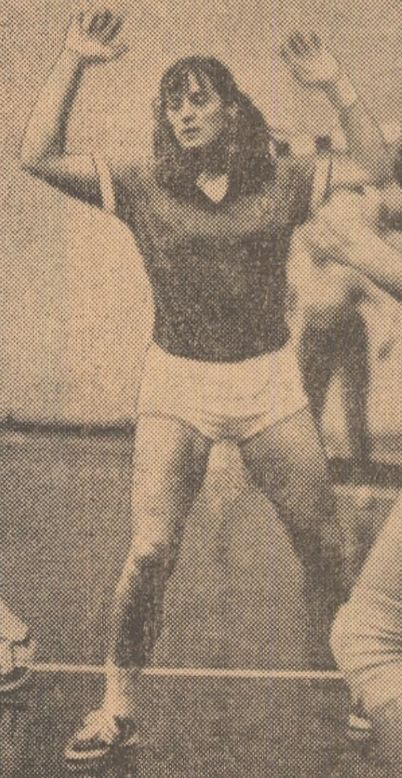

Personal information
- Nationality: German
- Born: 24 October 1946 (age 79) Zwickau, Soviet occupation zone in Germany
- Height: 169 cm (67 in)

Sport
- Sport: Handball
- Position: Centre back

Youth career
- Years: Team
- –: BSV Sachsen Zwickau

Senior clubs
- Years: Team
- 1965-1980: Berliner TSC
National team
Years	Team	Apps	(Gls)
1966-1980	East Germany	235	(880)
Medal record
Representing East Germany
Olympic Games
Silver medal – second place	1976 Montreal	Team
Bronze medal – third place	1980 Moscow	Team
World Championship
Gold medal – first place	1971 Netherlands
Gold medal – first place	1975 Soviet Union
Gold medal – first place	1978 Czechoslovakia

Kristina Richter (née Hochmuth, born 24 October 1946) is a former East German handball player who won the World Championship three times with the East German national team. She also competed in the 1976 Summer Olympics and in the 1980 Summer Olympics.

She was inducted into Germany's Sports Hall of Fame in July 2016.

== Playing career ==
Richter started playing handball in 1963 after first practicing athletics. She started as a youth player for BSG Aktivist „Karl Marx“ Zwickau, before joining Berliner TSC in 1965. Here she played the rest of her career until 1980. With the club she won EHF European Champions Cup in 1978, the DDR Championship in 1974, 1977, 1978 and 1980 and the DDR Cup in 1977, 1978, 1979 and 1980.

=== National team ===
In 1971 she was part of the East German team that won the 1971 World Championship.

At the 1975 World Championship she won her second world championship.

In 1976 at the 1976 Olympics she won a silver medal with the East German team. She played all five matches and scored 27 goals.

Four years later she won a bronze medal as a member of the East German team. She played all five matches and scored 19 goals.

At the 1978 World Women's Handball Championship she was joint top scorer together with Milena Foltynova with 41 goals, when East Germany won their third title.

She has the 8th most matches ever for any of the German national teams and had the third most goals after Katrin Mietzner and Grit Jurack.

== Coaching career ==
From 1981 she coached youth teams at Berliner TSC. From 1994 she became the head coach of the 1st team.

== Awards and recognition ==
In 1976 she was awarded the DDR Patriotic Order of Merit in bronze. In 1980 she received the award in silver.

In 1980 she was the East German player of the year.

She was the Olympic flagbearer at the 1980 Olympics for East Germany.

== Private ==
Richter studied in Leipzig, while playing for BSG Aktivist „Karl Marx“ Zwickau. She is educated as a primary school teacher in sports and geography.

She was married from 1938 to the German cycling coach Dagomar Richter until his death in 2020. She has two children.

Her older brother was a handball coach at BSG Aktivist Karl Marx Zwickau.
