= Hannelore Burosch =

German handball player (born 1947)

Personal information
- Full name: Hannelore Burosch-Kühnert
- Nationality: German
- Born: 14 November 1948 (age 77) Rostock, East Germany
- Height: 175 cm (69 in)

Sport
- Sport: Handball

Senior clubs
- Years: Team
- –: SC Empor Rostock
National team
Years	Team	Apps
–	East Germany	131
Medal record
Women's handball
Representing East Germany
Silver medal – second place	1976 Montreal	East Germany
World Championship
Gold medal – first place	1971 Netherlands
Gold medal – first place	1975 Soviet Union
Gold medal – first place	1978 Czechoslovakia

Hannelore Burosch (later Kühnert; born 16 November 1947) is a former East German handball player, born in Rostock. She won the World Championship three times with the East German national team. She also competed in the 1976 Summer Olympics.

In 1976, she won the silver medal with the East German team. She played one match.

In 1976 and 1979 she received the DDR Patriotic Order of Merit in bronze.

At club level she played for SC Empor Rostock.
