= Hélène Tétreault =

Canadian handball player (1958–2025)

Hélène Tétreault (August 22, 1958 – August 30, 2025) was a Canadian handball player who competed in the 1976 Summer Olympics.

== Biography ==
Born in Granby, Quebec, Tétreault was part of the Canadian handball team, which finished sixth in the Olympic tournament. She played three matches and scored five goals.

Tétreault died in Montreal on August 30, 2025, at the age of 67.

== Sources ==
- profile
