= Doina Furcoi =

Romanian handball player (born 1945)

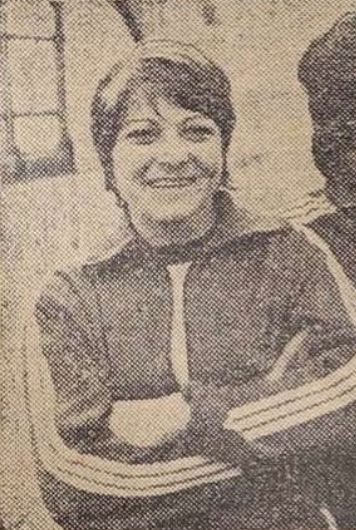
Doina Furcoi Solomonov

Doina Furcoi Solomonov (born 4 September 1945 in Miloșești, Ialomița County) is a former Romanian handball player who competed in the 1976 Summer Olympics.

She was part of the Romanian handball team, which finished fourth in the Olympic tournament. She played four matches and scored six goals.
