= 1971 World Women's Handball Championship =

1971 edition of the World Women's Handball Championship

Tournament details
- Host country: Netherlands
- Dates: 11 December 1971 - 19 December 1971

Final positions
- Champions: East Germany (1st title)
- Runners-up: Yugoslavia
- Third place: Hungary

Tournament statistics
- Matches played: 21
- Goals scored: 413 (19.67 per match)
- Top scorer: (Japan) Hidejo Taramizu (21 goals)

The 1971 World Women's Handball Championship took place in the Netherlands between 11-19 December 1971. After the 1968 edition was cancelled because of the intervention of Czechoslovakia from the Soviet Union, the 1971 edition took place in December 1971. East Germany took the title as they defeated Yugoslavia 11-8 in the final.

== Premlinary Round ==
=== Group A ===
Team	Pld	W	D	L	GF	GA	GD	Pts
Denmark	2	2	0	0	23	18	+5	4
West Germany	2	1	0	1	21	19	+2	2
Japan	2	0	0	2	14	21	−7	0

1971	West Germany	10–7	Japan	Netherlands

1971	Denmark	11–7	Japan	Netherlands

1971	Denmark	12–11	West Germany	Netherlands

=== Group B ===
Team	Pld	W	D	L	GF	GA	GD	Pts
Yugoslavia	2	1	1	0	26	19	+7	3
Romania	2	1	1	0	20	18	+2	3
Norway	2	0	0	2	13	22	−9	0

1971	Yugoslavia	14–7	Norway	Netherlands

1971	Romania	8–6	Norway	Netherlands

1971	Yugoslavia	12–12	Romania	Netherlands

=== Group C ===
Team	Pld	W	D	L	GF	GA	GD	Pts
East Germany	2	2	0	0	24	16	+8	4
Hungary	2	1	0	1	20	12	+8	2
Netherlands	2	0	0	2	11	27	−16	0

1971	Hungary	12–3	Netherlands	Netherlands

1971	East Germany	15–8	Netherlands	Netherlands

1971	East Germany	9–8	Hungary	Netherlands

== Main round ==
Team will compete for Places 1-2
Team will compete for Places 3-4

=== Group A ===
Team	Pld	W	D	L	GF	GA	GD	Pts
East Germany	2	2	0	0	24	17	+7	4
Romania	2	0	1	1	21	23	−2	1
Denmark	2	0	1	1	18	23	−5	1

1971	Romania	11–11	Denmark	Netherlands

1971	East Germany	12–10	Romania	Netherlands

1971	East Germany	12–7	Denmark	Netherlands

=== Group B ===
Team	Pld	W	D	L	GF	GA	GD	Pts
Yugoslavia	2	2	0	0	23	14	+9	4
Hungary	2	1	0	1	18	22	−4	2
West Germany	2	0	0	2	18	23	−5	0

1971	Yugoslavia	11–8	West Germany	Netherlands

1971	Hungary	12–10	West Germany	Netherlands

1971	Yugoslavia	12–6	Hungary	Netherlands

=== Ranking Round ===
Team	Pld	W	D	L	GF	GA	GD	Pts
Norway	2	2	0	0	21	18	+3	4
Netherlands	2	0	1	1	19	20	−1	1
Japan	2	0	1	1	23	25	−2	1

1971	Japan	12–12	Netherlands	Netherlands

1971	Norway	8–7	Netherlands	Netherlands

1971	Norway	13–11	Japan	Netherlands

== Placement Round ==
=== Fifth Place Playoff ===
18.12.1971	West Germany	13–9	Denmark	Netherlands

=== Third Place Playoff ===
19.12.1971	Hungary	12–11	Romania	Netherlands

=== Final ===
19.12.1971	East Germany	11–8	Yugoslavia	Netherlands

== Final standings ==
#	Team
Gold medal	East Germany
Silver medal	Yugoslavia
Bronze medal	Hungary
4	Romania
5	West Germany
6	Denmark
7	Norway
8	Netherlands
9	Japan

== Winning team ==
- Kristina Hochmuth
- Waltraud Kretzschmar
- Maria Winkler
- Bärbel Braun
- Petra Kahnt
- Waltraud Mester
- Barbara Helbig
- Barb Heinz
- Renate Breuer
- Barbara Starke
- Hannelore Zober
- Hannelore Burosch
- Edelgard Rothe
- Adelheid Dobrunz
- Liane Michaelis
- Brigitte Lück

Coach: Hans Becker and Harry Becker.
