= Magdalena Mikloș =

Romanian handball player (born 1948)

Magdalena Miklós Ilyés
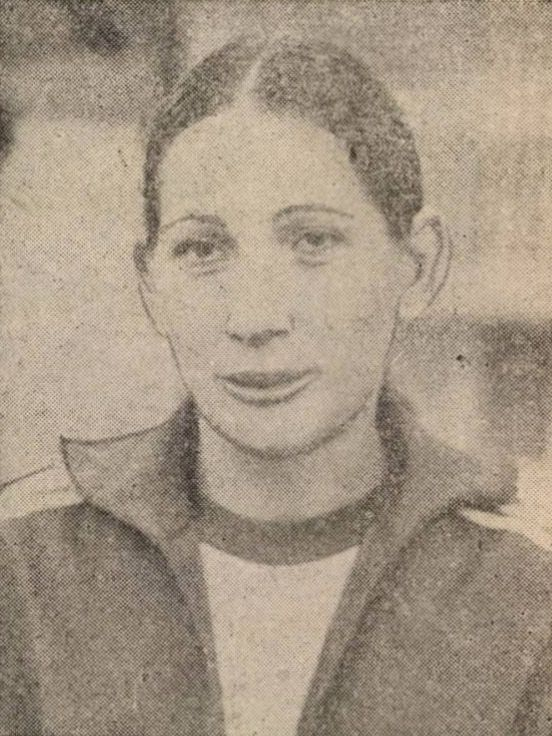

Personal information
- Full name: Magdalena Miklós Ilyés
- Nationality: Romanian
- Born: July 4, 1948 (age 78) Odorheiu Secuiesc, Romania

Sport
- Sport: Handball

Magdalena Miklós Ilyés (born July 4, 1948, in Odorheiu Secuiesc, Romania) is a former Romanian handball player who competed in the 1976 Summer Olympics.

She was part of the Romanian handball team, which finished fourth in the Olympic tournament. She played all five matches and scored fourteen goals.

Her son Ferenc Ilyés and daughter Annamária Ilyés are both international handball players representing Hungary.
