= Tokai University =

Private university in Tokyo, Japan

- 東海大学
- Type: Private non-sectarian higher education institution
- Established: 1942; 84 years ago
- Affiliations: Tokyo 12 Universities
- President: Tatsuro Matsumae
- Undergraduates: 28,584 (2017)
- Postgraduates: 969 (2017)
- Location: Tokyo, Japan; 35.664478°N 139.6848°E
- Campus: Tokyo, Kanagawa, Shizuoka, Kumamoto and Hokkaido
- Colors: Blue
- Mascot: Seagull
- Website: www.u-tokai.ac.jp

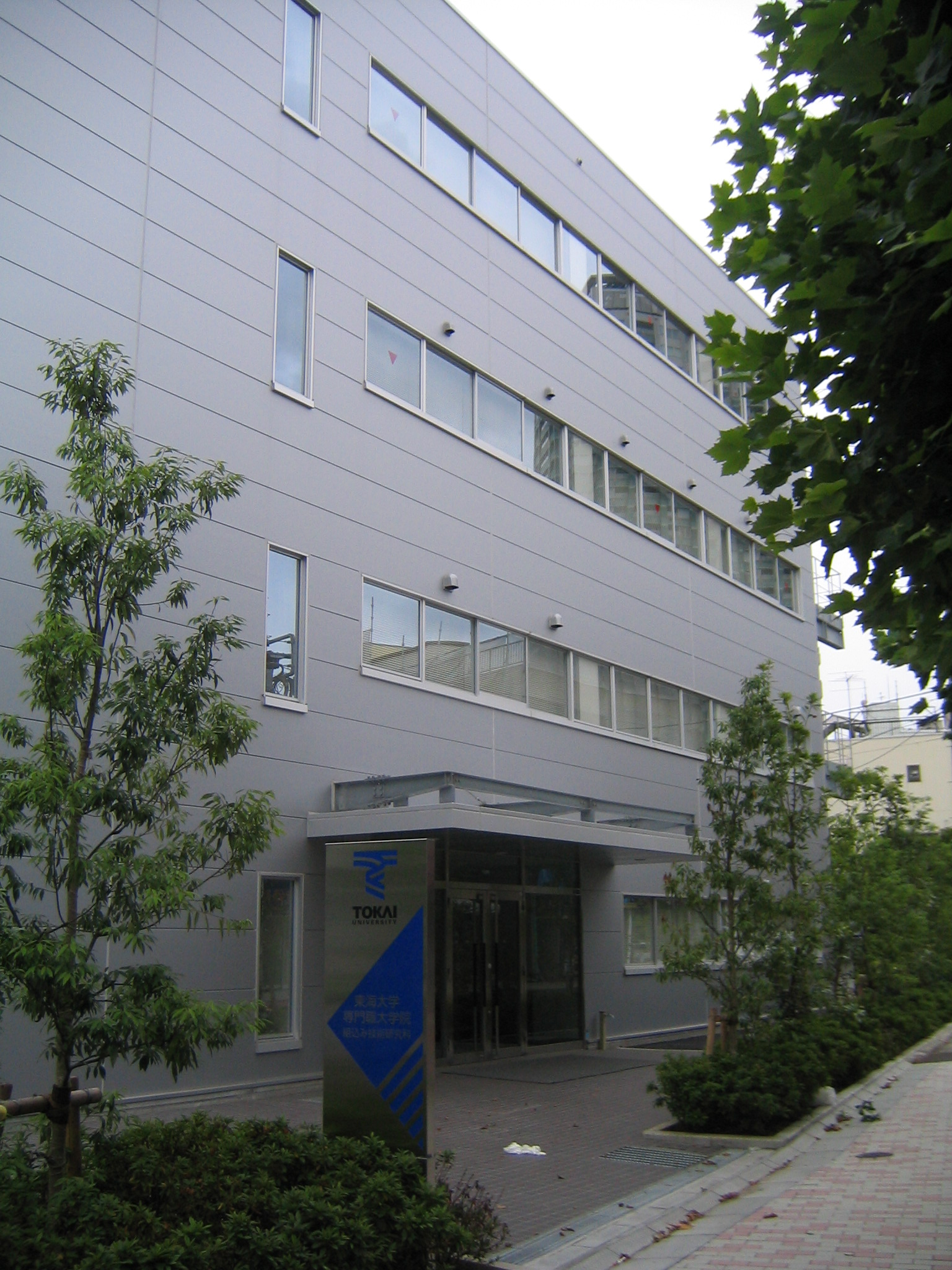
Takanawa campus, Tōkai University

Tokai University (東海大学, Tōkai Daigaku) is a private non-sectarian higher education institution located in Tokyo, Japan. It was founded by Shigeyoshi Matsumae.

It was accredited under Japan's old educational system in 1946 and under the new system in 1950. In 2008, Tokai University, Kyushu Tokai University, and Hokkaido Tokai University were consolidated and reorganized into Tokai University. Its Chinese character name is the same as Tunghai University in Taiwan.

== History ==
The Bosei Seminar 望星学塾 (Bōsei gakujuku) was founded at Musashino to realize Dr. Shigeyoshi Matsumae's concept of education to the public.

Dr. Matsumae founded the establishing entity of the university, or the Tokai University Educational System, in 1942. The university went through phases under Japan's old educational systems, and reorganized schools accordingly roughly upon three stages for four times.

=== Training institutions for engineers and industrial schools ===
Foundation for Telecommunications Engineering School 財団法人電気通信工学校 (Zaidanhōjin Denki Tsūshin Kōgakkō) (14 October 1937 – 21 September 1944) operated three schools for telecommunications (21 October 1937 – 21 September 1945), which were renamed firstly to Polytechnic School (21 September 1945 – March 1947) then to Tokai Higher Telecommunications Engineering School (March 1947 - March 1965).

=== Old technical college ===
Under the College Law of 27 March 1903

Before the end of World War II, technical colleges were governed under the College Law of 27 March 1903 専門学校令 (Semmon gakkō-rei), and the Foundation for National Defense Science and Technology Institute 財団法人国防理工学園 (Zaidanhōjin Kokubō Rikō Gakuen) (8 December 1942 - 15 August 1945) operated Radio Wave Technology Development Institute (1 February 1944 – 15 August 1945), Radio Science College (18 April 1944 – 15 August 1945). In 1943 Dr. Matsumae opened the Aerial Science College 航空科学専門学校 (Kōkū Kagaku Semmongakkō) (8 April 1943 – 15 August 1945), an antecedent of Tokai University in Miho, Shizuoka, Japan.

=== After 1945 ===
Under Kyūsei daigaku system - the former Education Law of 6 December 1918

Foundation for National Defense Science and Technology Institute was renamed to Tokai Gakuen Foundation 財団法人東海学園 (Zaidanhōjin Tōkaigakuen) (15 August 1945 – May 1, 1946) under Kyūsei daigaku system, and merged three educational establishments into Tokai College (15 August 1945 - 20 October 1945) which was renamed to Tokai Science College (20 October 1945 – March 1950).

Before the Shinsei daigaku system went into effect in 1947, the Foundation was reformed to Tokai University Foundation (1 May 1946 – 7 March 1951) under former Education Law of 6 December 1918, which operated former Tokai University (1 May 1946 – 1 April 1950) where students finished university education in three years.

Under Shinsei daigaku system - the Education Law of 31 March 1947

School systems in Japan was reformed in March 1947, when colleges and universities regulated under the former law of education were reformed to four-years-system educational institutions.

== Educational System ==
The Tokai University Educational System is one of the largest general education and research institutions in Japan. Today, Tokai University holds its headquarters in Yoyogi, Tokyo, with eight campuses all over Japan at Sapporo, Takanawa and Yoyogi in Tokyo, Hiratsuka and Isehara in Kanagawa, Shizuoka, with Kumamoto and Aso in Kumamoto; 21 schools and faculties make up approximately 80 departments, majors, and programs. With its graduate school offering 21 courses, the total student enrollment for both undergraduate and graduate is approximately 30,000 including 775 international students as of 2017. There are 1,653 faculty members with the ratio of students per a faculty member below 30.

== Achievements ==
=== Industry-academia-government collaboration ===
As Ministry of Education, Culture, Sports, Science and Technology has been encouraging joint ventures among the industry sector, academia and government functions, between 1994 and 2004, Tokai University applied 519 patents compared to Nihon University (390), Waseda University (358), Tokyo Institute of Technology (338) and 324 cases for Nagoya University. By 2004, Tokyo University as a national institute lead 1,361 joint ventures, Waseda University lead 683 as the top private institute against 278 by Tokai University ranking at the 15th place, whereas Tokai University was commissioned 211 projects (12th) while Tokyo University attracted 818 at the top.

=== Le Mans 24 Hours ===
A student team at Tōkai University fielded a car for the Le Mans 24 Hours race in 2008. This was the first time that a university team attempted to enter the race.

The team entered a Courage-Oreca LC70-YGK numbered 22 in the LMP1 class. It completed 185 laps (just under half that of the race winner), retiring due to a gearbox problem, and was not classified.

- TOKAI UNIVERSITY Le Mans Project

It has been confirmed that they will race in the Asian Le Mans Series in November 2009. The team raced at the 2010 1000 km of Zhuhai and will race again at the 2011 6 Hours of Zhuhai, both races are part of the Intercontinental Le Mans Cup.

=== Global Green Challenge ===
The Tokai Challenger is a solar car. The Tokai Challenger has become the winner of the 2009 World Solar Challenge, a race for solar cars across Australia. The car was designed and tested in collaboration with students from Tokai University and several Japanese companies in the automotive industry.

The Tokai Challenger covered the 3,021 kilometers off in 29 hours 49 minutes and it took an average speed of 100.54 kilometers per hour.

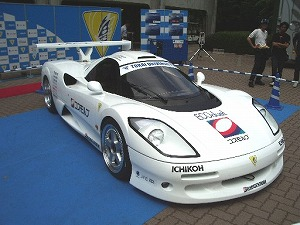
Study Car 2005

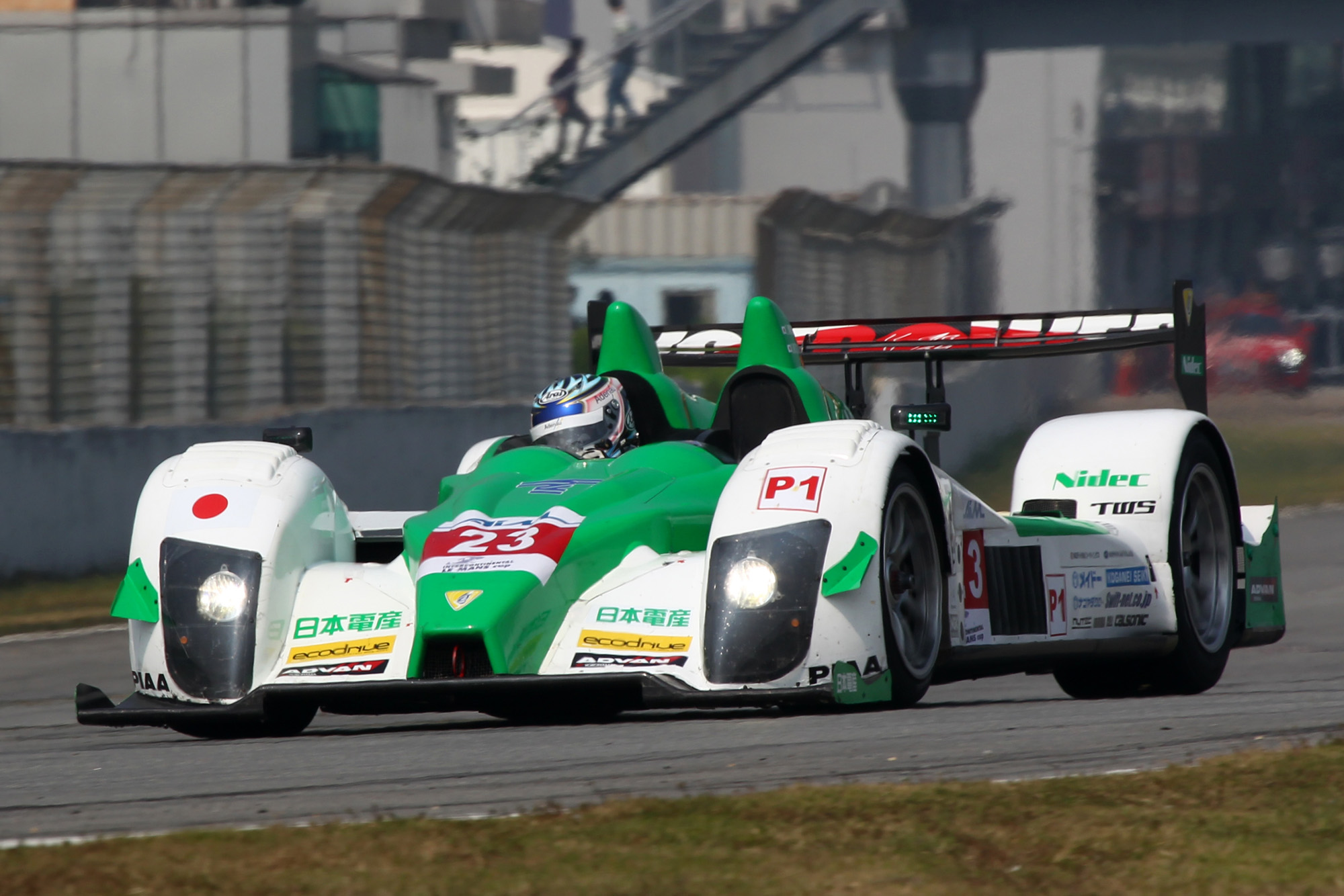
Courage-Oreca LC70 at 2010 1000 km of Zhuhai

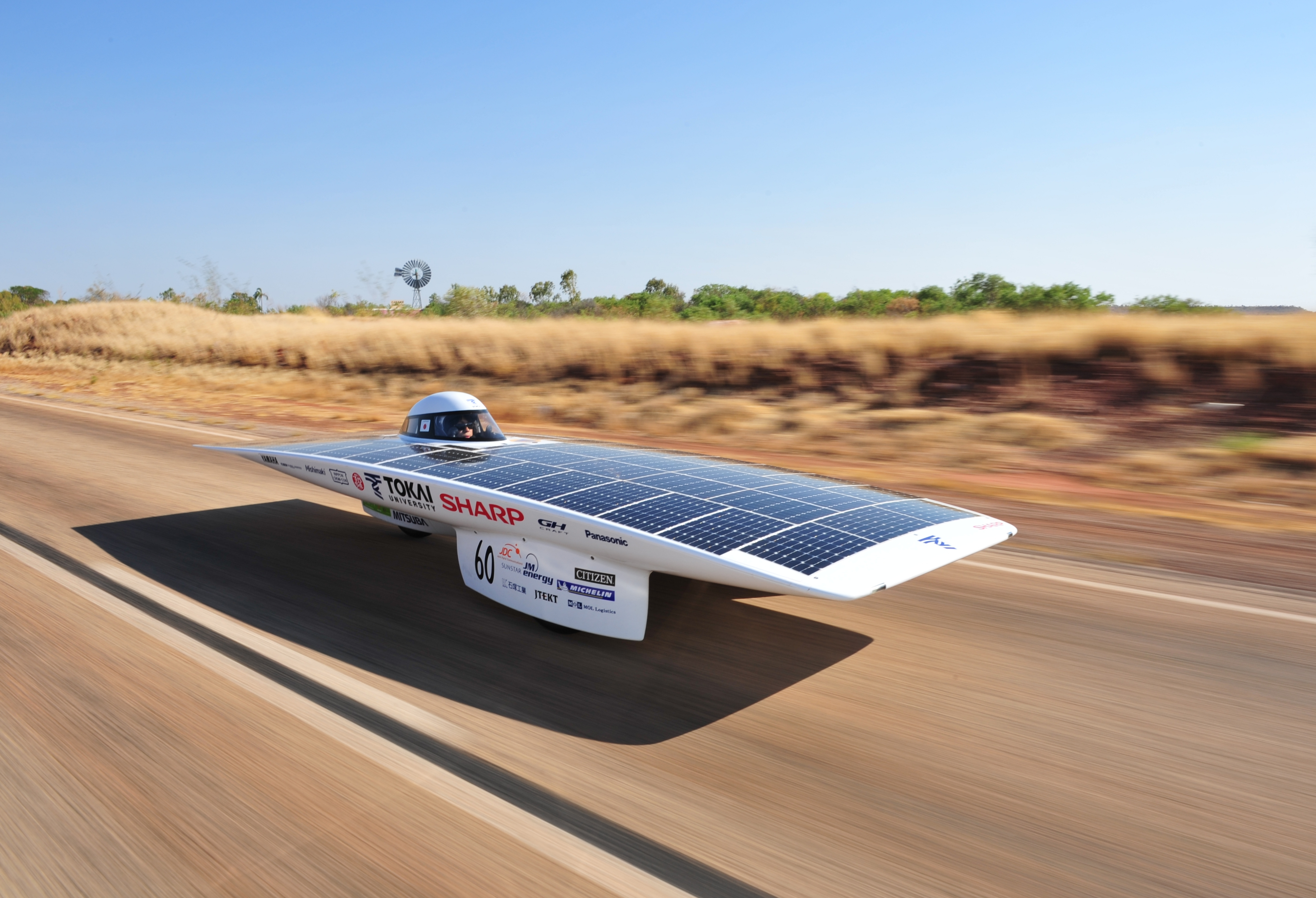
Tokai Challenger, the winner of 2009 Global Green Challenge, Japan. (Tokai University Solar Car Team)

== Public relations ==
=== The Tokyo 12 Universities ===
The university is a member of the Tokyo 12 Universities, a joint public relations body for those headquartered in Tokyo, formed in 1964. It consists of Aoyama Gakuin University, Chuo University, Hosei University, Keio University, Kokugakuin University, Meiji University, Nihon University, Rikkyo University, Senshu University, Sophia University, and Waseda University.

=== Collaborative administration for university facilities ===
The Research and Promotion Division administers Technical Collaborative Management Office to promote aggressive research activities by the faculty and student of the university, as well as to share university facilities with private companies and regions, aiming to return resources to society.

== Affiliated institutions ==
=== Archive, memorial halls and museums ===
- Bōsei Academic and Archive Center - Archive
- Matsumae Commemoration Hall - on Shonan campus
- Museum of the School of Marine Science and Technology, Tokai University - an aquarium.
- Shigeyoshi Matsumae Memorial Hall (松前重義記念館 (Matsumae Shigeyoshi kinenkan)) - on Kumamoto campus

=== Boarding school ===
- Tokai University Boarding School in Denmark (now closed)

=== Extension centers ===
- Bōsei gakujuku - classes offered to children and adults on the original site of 望星学塾 (Bōsei gakujuku) at Musashino
- Regional Collaboration Center - programs on Shonan, Takanawa and Kumamoto campuses with off campus offerings co-hosted by the city of Sagamihara

=== Publishing ===
- Tokai University Press
- Tokai Newspress - a campus newspaper with its website
- Tokai Sports – weblog for students' sports activities, discontinued January 2018

=== Research institutes and research centers ===
- Creative Science and Technology Research Organization
- Civilization Laboratory
- Ocean Research Laboratory
- Integrated Medicinal Laboratory
- Advanced Life Science Institute
- Educational Development Research Center
- Sports Medical Science Institute
- Agricultural Research Institute
- Okinawa Area Studies Center
- Research Institute for Science and Technology
- Information Technology Center
- Space Information Center
- Integrated Social Science Institute
- Peace Strategy International Research Institute
- Micro / Nano Research and Development Center
- Life Sciences Institute at the Junior College
- Integrated Nursing Research Facility at Medical Technology Junior College
- Tourism and Culture Research Institute at Fukuoka Junior College

=== Welfare facilities ===
- Ginreiso - cottage for mountaineering/ski in Jōzankei area
- Tsumagoi Training Center - Sports and lecture facilities with accommodation, open to the public, Gumma prefecture
- Yamanakako Seminar House - near Lake Yamanaka
- Miho Training Center - a hotel with lecture rooms, open to the public
- Matsumae Hall (松前会館 (Matsumae kaikan)) - on Shonan campus
- International Friendship Hall - in the vicinity of Shonan campus, Hadano
- International House - on Sapporo campus
- International Hall – students' hall for international students on Shonan campus

== Notable alumni ==
- Mashu Baker – Japanese judoka
- Nana Eikura – actress, model
- Ryunosuke Haga – Japanese judoka
- Tatsunori Hara – manager of the Yomiuri Giants
- Eikō Harada – president of McDonald's Japan
- Kosei Inoue – Japanese judoka
- Toru Kamikawa – international football referee
- Yuki Kawamura – basketball player currently with the Los Angeles Clippers
- Radomir Kovačević – Serbian-Yugoslav judoka, coach, and bronze medalist at the 1980 Summer Olympics
- Yuya Kubo – pitcher for the Yomiuri Giants
- Michael Leitch – Rugby Union Player
- Kazuo Sawa – video game music composer and musician
- Riki Nakaya – Japanese judoka
- Kenzo Nakamura – Japanese judoka
- Yoshio Nakamura – Japanese judoka
- Yukimasa Nakamura – Japanese judoka
- Takuya Nakayama – basketball player
- Satoko Okudera – screenwriter
- Akinori Otsuka – pitcher for the Texas Rangers
- Kenji Sakaguchi – actor
- Kunihiro Shimizu – Japan national volleyball player
- Kenjiro Shinozuka – rally driver
- Shingo Suetsugu
- Tomoyuki Sugano — pitcher for the Colorado Rockies
- Naohisa Takato – Japanese judoka
- Kazuaki Tasaka – Japanese football player
- Maki Tsukada
- Naoki Eiga – Japanese kendoka
- Toshihide Wakamatsu – actor
- Yasuhiro Yamashita – undefeated Japanese judoka
- Shiho Yoshimura – former volleyball player
- Taishi Onodera – Japanese volleyball player
