= Matsushita =

Matsushita (written: 松下 lit. "below the pine tree") is a Japanese surname. Notable people with the surname include:

- Daisuke Matsushita (born 1981), a former Japanese football player
- Hiro Matsushita (born 1961), former Japanese Champ Car racing driver, businessman and grandson of Konosuke Matsushita. Chairman of Swift Engineering & Swift Xi
- Hitomi Matsushita (松下 仁美; born 1954), Japanese handball player
- Ko Matsushita, a Japanese conductor and composer
- Kōhei Matsushita (born 1985), a Japanese football (soccer) player currently playing for Ehime F.C.
- Konosuke Matsushita (1894–1989), a Japanese industrialist and founder of Matsushita Electric Industrial Co., Ltd., now known as Panasonic Corporation
- Masaharu Matsushita (1912–2012), a Japanese businessman, the second president of Matsushita Electric, and son-in-law of Konosuke Matsushita
- Miyuki Matsushita (born 1969), a Japanese voice actress
- Moeko Matsushita (born 1982), a Japanese singer and actress
- Nao Matsushita (born 1985), a Japanese actress and pianist
- Nobuharu Matsushita (born 1993), a Japanese racing driver
- Sayami Matsushita (born 1982), a Japanese archer
- Shinpei Matsushita (born 1966), a Japanese politician of the Democratic Party of Japan
- Susumu Matsushita (born 1950), a Japanese manga artist
- Tadahiro Matsushita (born 1949), member of the House of Representatives of Japan
- Toshihiro Matsushita (born 1983), a Japanese football (soccer) player currently playing for Albirex Niigata
- Yuki Matsushita (actress) (松下 由樹; born 1968), Japanese actress
- Yuki Matsushita (footballer) (松下 裕樹; born 1981), Japanese footballer
- Yukihiro Matsushita (松下 幸広; born 1973), Japanese swimmer
- Yuya Matsushita (born 1990), a Japanese R&B and Hip Hop singer and performer

== See also ==
- Matsushita Electric Industrial, now Panasonic Corporation, a multinational electronics corporation based in Kadoma, Japan
- Matsushita Electric Works, now Panasonic Electric Works, a lighting, building materials, and appliance manufacturer in Japan
- Matsushita Station, a train station on the JR Central Sangū Line in Ise, Mie Prefecture, Japan
- Matsushita Whiteline Skip, a compression scheme employed on Panasonic fax machines
