= Hannelore Zober =

East German handball player (1946–2026)

Personal information
- Nationality: German
- Born: 6 November 1946 Leipzig, Allied-occupied Germany
- Died: 28 June 2026 (aged 79) Leipzig, Germany

Sport
- Sport: Handball
- Position: Goalkeeper

Senior clubs
- Years: Team
- –: SC Leipzig
National team
Years	Team	Apps
1966-1980	East Germany	168
Medal record
Olympic Games
Silver medal – second place	1976 Montreal	Team
Bronze medal – third place	1980 Moscow	Team
World Championship
Gold medal – first place	1971 Netherlands
Gold medal – first place	1975 Soviet Union
Gold medal – first place	1978 Czechoslovakia

Hannelore Zober (6 November 1946 – 28 June 2026) was an East German handball player who won the IHF World Women's Handball Championship three times. She also competed in the 1976 Summer Olympics and in the 1980 Summer Olympics.

In 1976 she won the silver medal with the East German team. She played four matches including the final as goalkeeper.

Four years later she won the bronze medal as a member of the East German team. She played all five matches as goalkeeper.

In 1976 and 1979 she was awarded the DDR Patriotic Order of Merit in bronze.

At club level she played for SC Leipzig, where she won the DDR-Championship 10 times and the 1966 and 1974 European Champions Cup.

Zober died on 28 June 2026, at the age of 79.
