= Maria Lackovics =

Romanian handball player (born 1950)

Maria Lackovics (born 24 March 1950) is a former Romanian handball player who competed in the 1976 Summer Olympics.

She was part of the Romanian handball team, which finished fourth in the Olympic tournament. She played three matches and scored three goals.
