= Constantina Pițigoi =

Romanian handball player (born 1946)

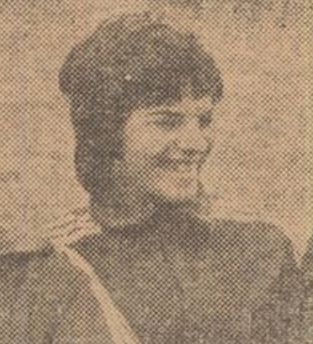
Constantina Pițigoi

Constantina Pițigoi (born 25 June 1946) is a former Romanian handball player who competed in the 1976 Summer Olympics.

Pițigoi was part of the Romanian handball team, which finished fourth in the Olympic tournament. She played all five matches and scored two goals.
