= Waltraud Kretzschmar =

German handball player (1948-2018)

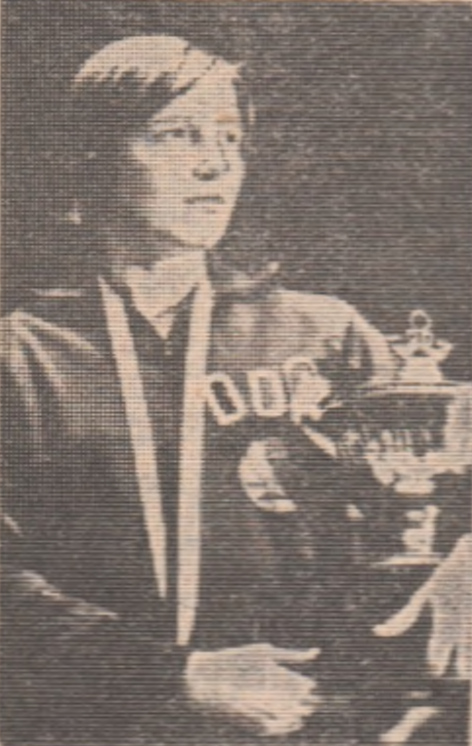
- Waltraud Kretzschmar in 1978

Personal information
- Full name: Waltraud Hermann
- Nationality: German
- Born: 1 February 1948 Kloster Lehnin, Allied-occupied Germany
- Died: 7 February 2018 (aged 70)

Sport
- Sport: Handball

Youth career
- Years: Team
- –: BSG Traktor Damsdorf

Senior clubs
- Years: Team
- 1964-1980: SC Leipzig
National team
Years	Team	Apps	(Gls)
–	East Germany	217	(727)
Medal record
Olympic Games
Silver medal – second place	1976 Montreal	Team
Bronze medal – third place	1980 Moscow	Team
IHF World Championship
Gold medal – first place	1971 Netherlands
Gold medal – first place	1975 Soviet Union
Gold medal – first place	1978 Czechoslovakia

Waltraud Kretzschmar (née Hermann then Czelake, 1 February 1948 in Kloster Lehnin – 7 February 2018) was an East German handball player who competed in the 1976 Summer Olympics and in the 1980 Summer Olympics. In the 1970s, she was considered the best and most successful handball player in the world.

In 1976 she won the silver medal with the East German team. She played three matches including the final and scored eight goals. Four years later she won the bronze medal as a member of the East German. She played one match and scored one goal.

Kretzschmar married her coach, Peter Kretzschmar, in 1972. They lived in Schöneiche near Berlin. She died unexpectedly on 7 February 2018 and was buried in Leipzig in a family grave. Stefan Kretzschmar is their son.
