= Petra Uhlig =

East German handball player (born 1954)

Olympic medal record

Olympic Games
Silver medal – second place	1976 Montreal	Team
Bronze medal – third place	1980 Moscow	Team

World Championship
Gold medal – first place	1971 Netherlands	
Gold medal – first place	1975 Soviet Union	
Gold medal – first place	1978 Czechoslovakia	

Petra Uhlig (born 22 July 1954) is a former East German handball player. She won the World Championship three times with the East German national team. She also competed in the 1976 Summer Olympics and in the 1980 Summer Olympics. She has the record for most matches for the East German national team and the third most matches for any German team behind Michaela Erler and Grit Jurack with 284 games and 487 goals. She debuted for the East German national team at the age of 17.

In 1976 she won the silver medal with the East German team. She played all five matches and scored five goals.

Four years later she won the bronze medal as a member of the East German. She played all five matches and scored six goals.

At club level she played for SC Leipzig, where she won 7 national championships and the European Champions Cup.

In 1984 she was awarded the DDR Patriotic Order of Merit in gold, and was chosen as East German player of the year.

Her daughter Alexandra Uhlig is also a handball player.
