= Iuliana Hobincu =

Romanian handball player (born 1954)

Iuliana Hobincu (born May 29, 1954) is a Romanian former handball player who competed in the 1976 Summer Olympics.

She was part of the Romanian handball team, which finished fourth in the Olympic tournament. She played three matches and scored three goals.
