= Maria Bosi =

Romanian handball player (born 1954)

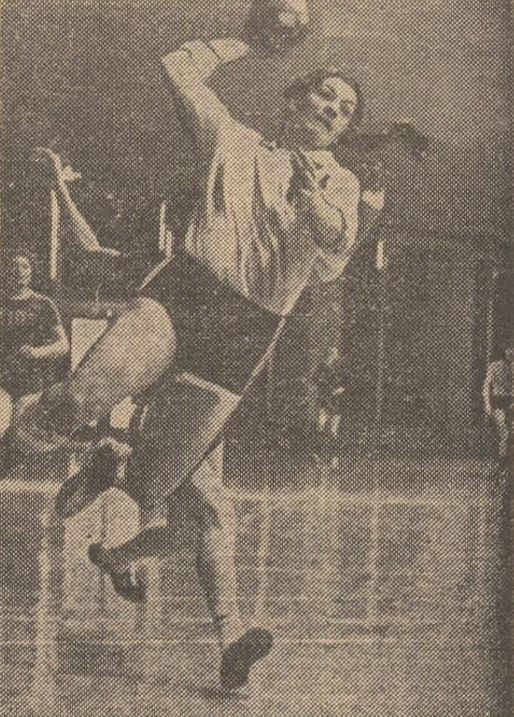
Bosi playing handball

Maria Bosi Igorov (born April 26, 1954, in Bistriţa) is a former Romanian handball player who competed in the 1976 Summer Olympics.

She was part of the Romanian handball team, which finished fourth in the Olympic tournament. She played all five matches and scored 13 goals.
