= Komori (surname) =

Komori (Japanese: 小森, lit. 'small forest') is a Japanese surname. Notable people with the surname include:

- Arthur Komori (1915–2000), Japanese-American spy
- Junichi Komori (1941–2015), Japanese three-cushion billiards player
- Kazutaka Komori (1943–1971), Japanese political activist
- Kuriko Komori (born 1954), Japanese handball player
- Miki Komori (born 1982), Japanese Porn Actress
- Yoshitaka Komori (小森 由貴; born 1987), Japanese football player
- Tomomi Komori (born 1983), Japanese field hockey player
- Yōichi Komori (born 1953), Japanese literary critic
- Yoshie Komori (born 1937), Japanese fencer
- Yukino Komori (born 1996), Japanese idol
- Yūta Komori, Japanese shogi player

== Fictional characters ==
- Aimi Komori, protagonists of Shadow Lady
- Kinoko Komori, a character in My Hero Academia
- Tomonori Komori (Akinori Komori), a character in Shadow Star (Narutaru)
