= Eikō Harada =

Japanese business executive (born 1948)

Eikō Harada 原田永幸
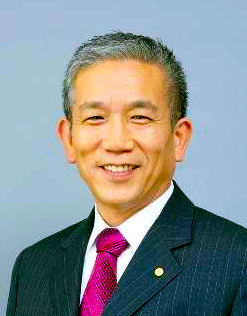
- Eikō Harada
- Born: December 3, 1948 (age 77); Sasebo, Nagasaki, Japan
- Occupation: Businessman

Eikō Harada (原田永幸, Harada Eikō; born December 3, 1948) is a Japanese business executive.

== Early life and education ==
Born in Sasebo, he graduated from that city's Nagasaki Prefectural Sasebo South High School, and then from Tokai University.

== Career ==
After working at National Cash Register Company Japan, Ltd. (Currently known as NCR Japan, Ltd.) and Yokogawa Hewlett-Packard Co., Ltd. (Currently known as Hewlett-Packard Japan, Ltd.), Harada served as a board member of Schlumberger K.K., Board member of Apple Japan, Inc., Vice President of Apple Computer, Inc., (USA), Representative Board and General Manager of Apple Japan, Inc., chairman, President and CEO, Representative Director of McDonald's Company (Japan), Ltd., chairman, President and CEO, Representative Director of McDonald's Holdings Company (Japan), Ltd., Representative Director, chairman and CEO of Benesse Holdings, Inc., chairman, President and CEO of Gong Cha Japan Co., Ltd., and a member of Gong Cha Group Global Senior Leadership Team.

Eikō Harada joined EGAO Co., Ltd. as CEO.

== Arrested ==
Harada was arrested by Tokyo Metropolitan Police Department due to alleged domestic violence to his wife on February 6, 2021. He denies the allegations, the Shibuya Police Station said. On February 24, 2021, he resigned as chairman, President and CEO of Gong Cha Japan "for personal reasons."

== Publications ==
Harada wrote a book, Tokoton Yareba, Kanarazu Dekiru (とことんやれば、必ずできる). It was published by Kanki Publishing in 2005.

== Personal life ==
Harada is married to J-pop singer-songwriter Yumi Tanimura.
