= Mikiko Kato =

Japanese handball player (born 1954)

Mikiko Kato (加藤 美起子, Katō Mikiko; born 11 November 1954) is a Japanese former handball player who competed in the 1976 Summer Olympics.
