= Silvia Siefert =

German handball player (born 1953)

Olympic medal record

Women's handball
Silver medal – second place	1976 Montreal	Team

World Championship
Gold medal – first place	1975 Soviet Union	

Silvia Siefert (born 19 July 1953) is a former East German handball player, born in Magdeburg, Germany. She is a world champion from the 1975 World Championship. She also competed in the 1976 Summer Olympics.

In 1976 she won the silver medal with the East German team. She played four matches including the final and scored five goals. For that she was awarded the DDR Patriotic Order of Merit in bronze.

She also participated in the 1973 World Championship.

At club level she played for SC Magdeburg.
