= Nicole Robert (handballer) =

Canadian handball player (born 1954)

Nicole Robert (born December 30, 1954, in Saint-Bruno-de-Montarville, Quebec) is a Canadian former handball player who competed in the 1976 Summer Olympics.

She was part of the Canadian handball team, which finished sixth in the Olympic tournament. She played four matches and scored ten goals.
