= Yuriy Lahutyn =

Soviet handball player

Olympic medal record

Men's Handball
Gold medal – first place	1976 Montreal	Team

Yuriy Vasilyevich Lahutyn (Ukrainian: Юрiй Васильович Лагутин, February 15, 1949 – April 30, 1978) is a former Soviet/Ukrainian handball player who competed in the 1972 Summer Olympics and in the 1976 Summer Olympics.

In 1972 he was part of the Soviet team which finished fifth. He played three matches and scored four goals.

Four years later he won the gold medal with the Soviet team. He played one match and scored three goals.
