= Gabriele Badorek =

German handball player (born 1952)

Olympic medal record

Women's handball
Silver medal – second place	1976 Montreal	Team

Gabriele Badorek (born 20 September 1952 in Rostock) is a former East German handball player who competed in the 1976 Summer Olympics.

In 1976 she won the silver medal with the East German team. She played all five matches and scored three goals.
