= Hiroko Kosahara =

Japanese handball player (born 1950)

Hiroko Kosahara (古佐原 ひろ子, Kosahara Hiroko; born 12 October 1950) is a Japanese former handball player who competed in the 1976 Summer Olympics.
