= Eva Paskuy =

German handball player (born 1948)

Personal information
- Nationality: German
- Born: 14 November 1948 (age 77) Zwickau, East Germany
- Height: 170 cm (67 in)

Sport
- Sport: Handball

Senior clubs
- Years: Team
- –: SC Empor Rostock
Medal record
Women's handball
Representing East Germany
Silver medal – second place	1976 Montreal	Team

Eva Paskuy (née Baldeweg; born 14 November 1948) is a former East German handball player, born in Dresden, who competed in the 1976 Summer Olympics.

In 1976 she won the silver medal with the East German team. She played all five matches. For that she was awarded the Patriotic Order of Merit in bronze.

At club level she played for SC Empor Rostock.

Afterwards she worked in kindergarden.
