= Johanne Valois =

Canadian handball player (born 1953)

Johanne Valois (French pronunciation: [ʒɔan valwa]; born September 28, 1953) is a former Canadian handball player who competed in the 1976 Summer Olympics.

Born in Saint-Jean-sur-Richelieu, Quebec, Valois was part of the Canadian handball team, which finished sixth in the Olympic tournament. She played all five matches and scored four goals.
