= Miloșești =

- Commune
- Location in Ialomița County

- Location in Romania
- Coordinates: 44°44′N 27°14′E
- Country: Romania
- County: Ialomița

Government
  - Mayor (2024–2028): Dumitru Trifu (PSD)
- Area: 49.24 km^{2} (19.01 sq mi)
- Elevation: 48 m (157 ft)
- Population (2021-12-01): 2,127
  - Density: 43.20/km^{2} (111.9/sq mi)
- Time zone: UTC+02:00 (EET)
  - Summer (DST): UTC+03:00 (EEST)
- Postal code: 927170
- Area code: +(40) 243
- Vehicle reg.: IL
- Website: www.milosesti.ro

Miloșești is a commune located in Ialomița County, Muntenia, Romania. It is composed of three villages: Miloșești, Nicolești, and Tovărășia.

Historical population
Year	Pop.	±%
1899	1,207	—
1925	1,195	−1.0%
2002	3,091	+158.7%
2011	2,735	−11.5%
2021	2,127	−22.2%
Source: Census data

== Natives ==
- Doina Furcoi (born 1945), handball player
