= Tokuko Kubo =

Japanese handball player (born 1952)

Tokuko Kubo (久保 徳子, Kubo Tokuko; born 21 October 1952) is a Japanese former handball player who competed in the 1976 Summer Olympics.
