= Komori Dam (Mie) =

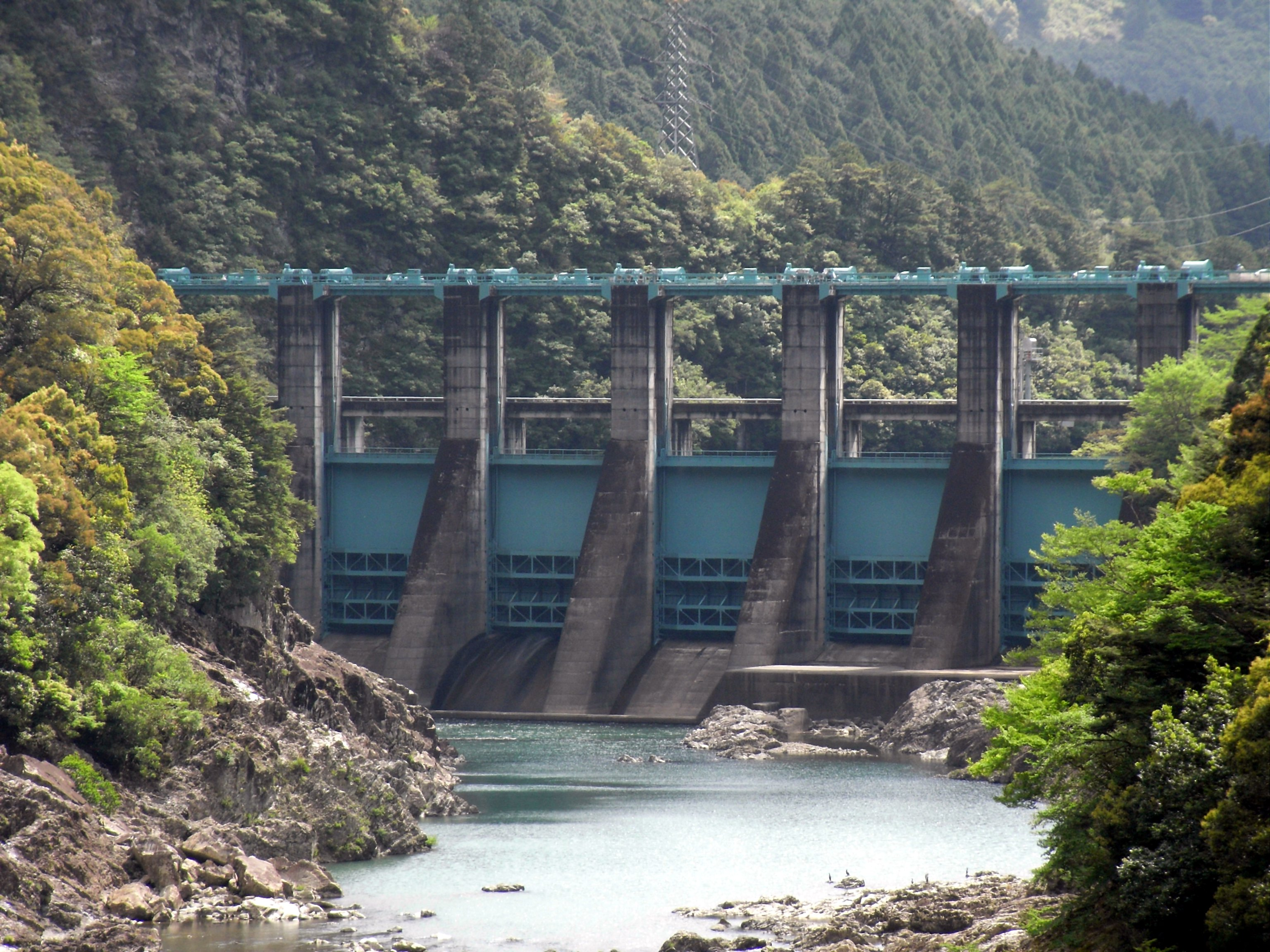

- Location within Japan
- Location: Kumano, Mie, Japan
- Coordinates: 33°56′5″N 135°55′40″E

Komori Dam is a gravity dam in Kumano, Mie Prefecture, Japan. It is used to generate power. Construction of the dam began in 1963 and was completed in 1965.
