= Eiko Ikegami =

Eiko Ikegami (池上英子) is a Japanese academic, author and the Walter A. Eberstadt Professor of Sociology and History at the New School of Social Research in New York. In 2006, she won the Mary Douglas Prize for Best Book in Cultural Sociology and the Distinguished Contribution to Scholarship Award in Political Sociology both from the American Sociological Association.

== Education and career ==
Ikegami attended Ochanomizu University in Tokyo, Japan from 1972 to 1976, receiving a B.A. in Japanese Literature. She was then a full-time journalist for the Japan Economic Journal until 1980, and then a researcher for CASA, Inc.

She then attended the Graduate School of Tsukuba, finishing with an M.A. in Area Studies. She received another M.A. from Harvard University in 1986 and a Ph.D. in 1989, both in sociology. She then joined Yale University as an assistant professor in Sociology, and then an associate professor from 1994 to 1998. In 1999, Ikegami she joined the Graduate Faculty at the New School for Social Research as a full professor of Sociology. From 1999 to 2003, she was also the director of the Center for Studies of Social Change. Ikegami is currently the chair and Walter A. Eberstadt Professor of Sociology and History at the New School of Social Research in New York.

She is associated in a Tokyo Foundation research project as a fellow of the Virtual Center for Advanced Studies in Institution (VCASI, pronounced “vee-kasi”).

== Major contributions ==
Her 2006 work "Bonds of Civility: Aesthetic Networks and the Political Origins of Japanese Culture" won the Mary Douglas Prize for Best Book in Cultural Sociology, the Distinguished Contribution to Scholarship Award in Political Sociology, and an honorable mention for the Barrington Moore Award in Comparative and Historical Sociology, all from the American Sociological Association, as well as the Mirra Komarovsky Book Prize from the Eastern Sociological Association. In 2007 the same publication won the John W. Hall Book Prize from the Association for Asian Studies. Bonds of Civility was published in a series on Structural Sociology edited by Mark Granovetter. Rewritten for the Japanese audience as Bi to Reisetsu no Kizuna, the book was listed as the one of 15 most recommended books of the year by the Japan Economic Journal.

In 1997, her publication "The Taming of the Samurai: Honorific Individualism and the Making of Modern Japan" won the Best Book Award On Asia from the American Sociological Association.

== Selected works ==
In a statistical overview derived from writings by and about Eiko Ikegami, OCLC/WorldCat encompasses roughly 7 works in 10+ publications in 2 languages and 1,000+ library holdings.

- 自閉症という知性 (Autistic Intelligence) NHK Publishing(2019)
- ハイパーワールド (Hyper-World), NTT Publishing(2017)
- Disciplining the Japanese: the Reconstruction of Social Control in Tokugawa Japan (1989)
- The Taming of the Samurai: Honorific Individualism and the Making of Modern Japan (1995); Japanese translation: Meiyo to junnō: samurai seishin no rekishi shakaigaku (名誉と順応: サムライ精神の歴史社会学) (2000)
- Bonds of Civility: Aesthetic Networks and Political Origins of Japanese Culture (2005); Japanese translation: Bi to reisetsu no kizuna : Nihon ni okeru kōsai bunka no seijiteki kigen (美と礼節の絆: 日本における交際文化の政治的起源) (2005)
