= Georgeta Lăcusta =

Romanian handball player (born 1955)

Georgeta Lăcusta (born February 23, 1955) is a former Romanian handball player who competed in the 1976 Summer Olympics.

She was part of the Romanian handball team, which finished fourth in the Olympic tournament. She played three matches and scored four goals.
