= Shoko Wada =

Japanese handball player (born 1952)

Shoko Wada (和田 祥子, Wada Shōko; born 10 January 1952) is a Japanese former handball player who competed in the 1976 Summer Olympics.
