= Mariya Litoshenko =

Soviet handball player

Olympic medal record

Women's Handball
Gold medal – first place	1976 Montreal	Team

Mariya Penrivna Litoshenko (Ukrainian: Марія Петрівна Літошенко, born September 24, 1949) is a former Soviet/Ukrainian handball player who competed in the 1976 Summer Olympics. She was born in Kyiv.

In 1976 she won the gold medal with the Soviet team. She played all five matches and scored six goals.
