= Liane Michaelis =

German handball player (born 1953)

Olympic medal record

Women's handball
Silver medal – second place	1976 Montreal	Team

World Championship
Gold medal – first place	1975 Soviet Union	

Liane Michaelis (born 23 April 1953) is a former East German handball player who is a world champion from the 1975 World Championship. She also won silver medals at the 1976 Summer Olympics.

At the 1976 Olympics she won the silver medal with the East German team. She played three matches.

In total she played 54 games for the East German national team.

At club level she played for SC Magdeburg.
