= Eiko Yamazawa =

Japanese photographer (1899–1995)

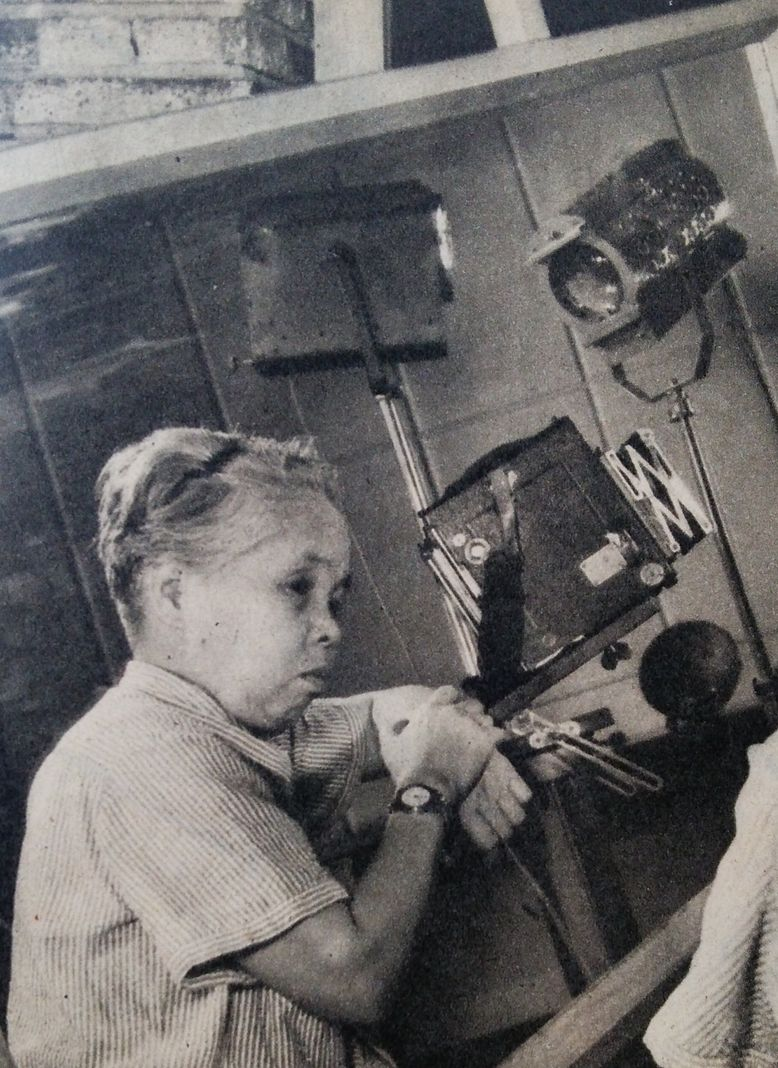
- Born: February 19, 1899; Osaka, Japan
- Died: July 16, 1995 (aged 96)
- Known for: Photography

Eiko Yamazawa (山沢 栄子, Yamazawa Eiko; February 19, 1899–July 16, 1995) was a renowned Japanese photographer. She is considered one of Japan's earliest women photographers and is among the few women photographers in Japan who were active both before and after World War II. First trained in Nihonga, she later studied photography in the U.S. under the mentorship of Consuelo Kanaga, and also exposed to the work of Kanaga's contemporaries such as Paul Strand and Edward Weston.

After coming back to Japan in 1929, she established herself as a professional photographer. In 1931 she opened a portrait studio in Osaka, and in 1950 she established the Yamazawa Institute of Photography also in Osaka. In the early half of her career, Yamazawa was engaged in portraiture and commercial photography, having produced work for major Osaka department stores. In 1960 she shifted abstraction away from realism. Her work in this latter half of her career is characterized by her photographing art materials in distortion and reflection. Yamazawa's photographs were unique at the time for their use of vibrant color, which was in stark contrast to black and white photography championed by other Japanese photographers.

== Early life and education ==
Yamazawa was born in Osaka as the third daughter to the owner of the Matsutari and Sada ironworks factory. As a child Yamazawa enjoyed being creative, having described her childhood with fond memories of growing up in factories and playing with building materials. She knew from a young age that she wanted to be an artist; she took painting lessons with the nihonga artist Rogetsu Mori and experimented with box cameras. From 1916 to 1918, Yamazawa attended nihonga classes at the Women's School of Fine Arts in Tokyo (currently Joshibi University of Art and Design) while studying yōga painting and photography on her own.

After graduation Yamazawa returned to Osaka and moved with her family to the countryside. There Yamazawa was continuing to paint on her own and with the help of her friends under the group name Hoshi, she self-published her first book Eiko Gashū (1921). During this time, Yamazawa was increasingly more involved with the Christian church and took English lessons at the Osaka YMCA. Through the support of local YMCA members, she was able to attain enough money to travel to the US at the age of 27.

=== America (July 1926 – February 1929) ===
In July 1926, Yamazawa travelled to the US where she enrolled in still life classes at the California School of Fine Arts. Yamazawa's father died soon after she arrived and as a result, Yamazawa was forced to seek out part-time work to pay for school tuition and living expenses. Through a serendipitous introduction by a local camera shop owner, Yamazawa began working as an apprentice to Consuelo Kanaga who was then primarily a portrait photographer in San Francisco. In 1927, Kanaga closed her studio to tour Europe and Yamazawa took on work as a photography assistant to an unidentified amateur photographer. After completing her studies at California SFA in December 1927, Yamazawa travelled to Europe in the spring of 1928. When Yamazawa came back to the US, she visited Kanaga in New York City and found a retouching job with Nikolas Murray, a photographer for Harpers Bazaar.

== Commercial photography career ==
=== Pre-war ===
Yamazawa returned to Osaka in 1929 and she started to work professionally as a photographer with a Graflex camera and other equipment gifted from Kanaga. Yamazawa's embracement of photography was in part motivated by a need to financially support her mother after the death of her father as well as her growing view of photography as an art form, informed by her experiences in the US. n 1931, Yamazawa opened her own photography studio at the Dojima Building in Osaka's business district where she shot mostly portraits. Yamazawa initial portraits were of members of the social club Seikosha, which included Osaka's financial community. She was then invited to move to the Osaka Sogo Department in Shinsaibaishi and relocation in 1935. She become known as a shokugyo-fujin “professional woman” and penned essays in the journal Kagayaku published by Shigure Hasegawa as well as Fujin Gahou. As Yamazawa's reputation grew, she began photographing the artistic community, including playwright Shigure Hasegawa and actress Yasue Yamamoto. Yamazawa often visited workshops Yamamoto participated in as part of the Shin-Tsukiji Theatre Company as well as the workshops Yamamoto held in her Sendagaya home.

=== During the war ===
During the war, Yamazawa followed Yamamoto to Shinsu (present day Kohigashi, Chino) in Nagano with her photography assistant Kazuko Hamachi. Although many of the images Yamazawa took before and during the war were lost in a studio fire (caused by an air strike), the images of Yamamoto taken in Shinsu are preserved in the book Yamamoto Yasue Butai Shashinshu (1960). At the time, Yamazawa borrowed an unused tofu mill and repurposed it into a studio, waiting until nightfall to use the running cold water for developing and fix images on the dirt floor. Yamazawa earned a living by photographing soldiers heading off to war in exchange for goods.

=== Post-war ===
Yamazawa returned to Osaka after the war and moved to the Hamachi Hospital in Kitakyutaromachi, owned by the family of her assistant. She worked as a studio photographer for the PX (US Army's Post Exchange) and then for the Osaka Mitsukoshi Department Store's photography department. She was one of the few people at the time who incorporated photography into advertisements and promotions, as they were typically drawn out by graphic designers. In 1950, she established the Yamazawa Institute of Photography at Hamachi Hospital Annex to mentor young women photographers. Two years later, Yamazawa opened her own commercial studio, for the last time, at the Osaka Sogo Department Store. Her final commercial project was the 60th anniversary book Hakurakuikko (1960) for Yodobashi jewelry store, for which she was in charge of the photography, design, and binding.

== Artistic career ==
Yamazawa's move towards abstraction within her artistic career is marked by her second visit to the US in January 1955, when Kanaga invited Yamazawa to see her photographs shown in the exhibition Family of Man. There Yamazawa was introduced to numerous painters and photographers active in New York and visited Imogen Cunningham on her way back to Japan.

As Yamazawa was increasingly pursuing her non-commercial work as a photographer in the mid 1950s, she eventually closed her studio in 1960. By 1962, Yamazawa published her seminal book Far and Near as declaration for dedicating her life to creative work as an artist. Far and Near consisted of 77 images of New York, still life shots, and early examples of abstraction, such as close-up images of tree rings and found objects, taken between 1943 and 1962. In Far and Near, the opening title translates to “Eye After Six Months in New York" in which Yamazawa spoke on her ability to create her own artistic work again after having been occupied with working in commercial studios. Yamazawa didn't make the conscious decision to focus on abstraction until the 1960s, evidenced by her first use of the word "abstract" in the title of her 1963 exhibition. By the 1970s, Yamazawa was fully committed to this style of photography, writing in her book Abstract Photographs (1976) that she “left photorealistic expression completely behind in the past.”

Yamazawa's abstract photographs of found objects and her art supplies dominated the remainder of her career and were released in a series of exhibitions under the title What I am Doing. Her first What I am Doing show was presented at Nikon Salon in Shinjuku, and was shown later in various iterations with iteration numbers, such as What I Am Doing 2 at the Line House in Kobe (1982) and What I Am Doing 3 at Asahi Gallery in Tokyo (1986).

Yamazawa's view of photography has often been theorized to be an extension of or equivalent to painting. Regarding the 1956 essay "Forty Years as a Woman Photographer" penned by Yamazawa, Tsukasa Ikegami, curator of Otani Memorial Art Museum, pointed out a discrepancy between Yamazawa's self-proclaimed 40 years working as a photography with the fact that Yamazawa's photography career began after she returned to Japan and exhibited her work in 1929, which would have made her career only 27 years by the time the essay was written. Ikegami suggested that this discrepancy was because Yamazawa potentially viewed photography and painting as artistic equivalents, which Ikegami further substantiated by Yamazawa's frequent mixing up of the words "photograph" and "painting" in the interview featured in the film High Heels and Ground Glass made by Barbara Kasten and Deborah Irmas. It was also known that Yamazawa destroyed negatives and created only one or two prints, which Kyoto University of the Art's Professor Noriko Fuku submitted was possibly Yamazawa's way “to create a unique artwork like a painting.”

== Final years ==
At the age of 85, Yamazawa moved into a nursing home in Kobe, and later relocated to one in Wakayama Prefecture. She died in 1995.

== Awards ==
Yamazawa has received multiple awards for her photography including the Osaka Prefecture Art Award (1955) for her book Quest; Photographic Society of Japan Distinguished Contributions Award (1977); Kobe City Cultural Prize (1980); Iue Culture Award (1986); Soroptimist Award (1986); and Japan Inter-Design Forum Award (1987).

== Selected solo exhibitions ==
Yamazawa was one of the few photographers at the time who held exhibitions and sold prints of their own work, though the majority of her exhibitions were held after her move to abstraction.

- 1929: Osaka YMCA
- 1932: Portraits of Creative Minds, Osaka Asahi Hall
- 1949: Yasue Yamamoto Costume Photographs, Osaka Asahi Hall Parlor
- 1956: In New York, Osaka Sogo; Ginza Matsuzakawa Tokyo
- 1963: Abstraction and Still Lifes, Osaka Sogo; Nihonbashi Mitsukoshi, Tokyo
- 1965: Figures and Still Lifes, Takashimaya New York
- 1979: What I Am Doing, Masago Gallery, Osaka
- 1982: What I Am Doing 2, Line House, Kobe
- 1983: Eiko Yamazawa: Abstract Photographs, Osaka Contemporary Art Center
- 1986: What I Am Doing 3, Asahi Gallery, Tokyo; Tamako Okazaki Gallery, Tokyo; ABC Gallery, Osaka
- 1994: Eiko Yamazawa Exhibition, Itami City Museum of Art
- 2012: Eiko Yamazawa Poster Exhibition, Dawn Center, Osaka
- 2019: Eiko Yamazawa: What I Am Doing, Otani Memorial Art Museum, Nishinomiya City; Tokyo Photographic Art Museum

== Selected publications ==
- Eiko Gashū (= Collected Paintings of Eiko). Osaka: Hoshi Publishing, 1921.
- Tankyū (= Quest). Osaka: Yamazawa Commercial Photography Studio, 1953.
- Far and Near. Tokyo: Miraishia, 1962.
- Abstract Photographs. Kobe: Yamazawa Photography Laboratory, 1976.
- Watashi wa Joryū Shashinka (= I am a Women Photographer). Osaka: Brain Center, 1983.
- Abstract Photographs. Tokyo: Tamako Okazaki Gallery, 1986.
- Yamazawa Eiko Ten (= Eiko Yamazawa Exhibition). Itami: Itami City Museum of Art, 1994.

== Cited references ==
- Eiko Yamazawa: What I Am Doing. Kyoto: Akaaka Art Publishing, Inc., 2019.
  - Tsukasa Ikegami “Eiko Yamazawa’s Path” (194-198)
  - Yoshiko Suzuki “ Eiko Yamazawa and American Modern Photography” (199-202)
- Fuku, Noriko. An Incomplete History: Women Photographers from Japan 1864–1997. Rochester: Visual Studies Workshop, 1998.
- Japanese Women Artists before and after World War II, 1930’s-1950’s. Tochigi: Tochigi Prefectural Museum of Fine Arts, 2001.

== Sources ==
- Nihon shashinka jiten (日本写真家事典) / 328 Outstanding Japanese Photographers. Kyoto: Tankōsha, 2000. ISBN 4-473-01750-8. (in Japanese) Despite the English-language alternative title, all in Japanese.
