= Terumi Kurata =

Japanese handball player (born 1951)

Terumi Kurata (蔵田 照美, Kurata Terumi; born 1 February 1951) is a Japanese former handball player. She competed in the 1976 Summer Olympics where she scored 28 goals, being top scorer of the olympic tournament.
