= Hitomi Matsushita =

Japanese handball player (born 1954)

Hitomi Matsushita (松下 仁美, Matsushita Hitomi; born 8 June 1954) is a Japanese former handball player. She competed in the 1976 Summer Olympics.
