= Mihoko Hozumi =

Japanese handball player (born 1955)

Mihoko Hozumi (穂積 美保子, Hozumi Mihoko; born 11 September 1955) is a Japanese former handball player who competed in the 1976 Summer Olympics.
