= Lyudmila Shubina =

Azerbaijani handball player

Personal information
- Full name: Lyudmila Yegorovna Shubina
- Born: October 9, 1948 (age 78) Kazan, Russia
- Height: 166 cm (65 in)

Sport
- Sport: Handball

Senior clubs
- Years: Team
- –: Trud Kazan
- –: Kalininez Sverdlovsk
- –: Spartak Baku
National team
- Years: Team
- 1970-1976: Soviet Union
Medal record
Women's Handball
Gold medal – first place	1976 Montreal	Team

Lyudmila Yegorovna Shubina (born October 9, 1948) is a former Soviet/Azerbaijani handball player. She won gold in the 1976 Summer Olympics with the Soviet team. She played three matches including the final and scored seven goals.
