= Eiko Kawada =

Japanese handball player (born 1955)

Eiko Kawada (河田 栄子; born 11 September 1955) is a Japanese former handball player who competed in the 1976 Summer Olympics.
