= Lyudmyla Panchuk =

Soviet handball player (1956–2011)

Olympic medal record

Women's Handball
Gold medal – first place	1976 Montreal	Team

World Championship
Gold medal – first place	1982 Hungary	Team
Silver medal – second place	1975 Soviet Union	Team

Lyudmyla (also transliterated as Liudmyla or Lyudmila) Mykhajlivna Panchuk (Ukrainian: Людмила Михайлiвна Панчук, January 18, 1956 – February 18, 2011) was a Soviet Ukrainian team handball player who competed in the 1976 Summer Olympics. In 1976 she won the gold medal with the Soviet team.
