= Natsue Shimada =

Japanese handball player (born 1950)

Natsue Shimada (島田 夏枝, Shimada Natsue; born 22 May 1950) is a Japanese former handball player who competed in the 1976 Summer Olympics.
