= Nataliya Tymoshkina =

Soviet handball player

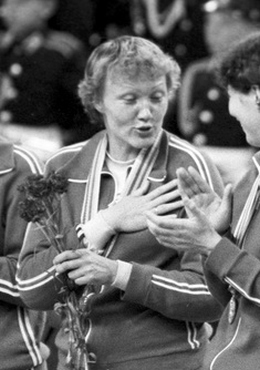
- Tymoshkina at the 1980 Olympics

Personal information
- Born: 25 May 1952 (age 74) Leznik, Ukraine
- Height: 175 cm (5 ft 9 in)
- Weight: 74 kg (163 lb)

Sport
- Sport: Handball
- Club: HC Spartak Kyiv
- Coached by: Igor Turchin
Medal record
Representing the Soviet Union
Olympic Games
Gold medal – first place	1976 Montreal	Team
Gold medal – first place	1980 Moscow	Team
World championships
Bronze medal – third place	1973 Yugoslavia	Team
Silver medal – second place	1975 Soviet Union	Team
Silver medal – second place	1978 Czechoslovakia	Team

Nataliya Leonidivna Tymoshkina (née Sherstyuk, Ukrainian: Наталія Леонідівна Тимошкіна-Шерстюк, born 25 May 1952) is a retired Ukrainian handball goalkeeper. She was part of the Soviet teams that won gold medals at the 1976 and 1980 Olympics and placed second at the 1975 and 1978 world championships. The Soviet team leaders Zinaida Turchyna and Tetyana Kocherhina credit the 1976 Olympic victory to Tymoshkina.

Tymoshkina started as a field player, and was converted into a goalkeeper by the coach. While she understood that she was more efficient in the goal she never liked that position.
