= Rafiga Shabanova =

Azerbaijani handball player

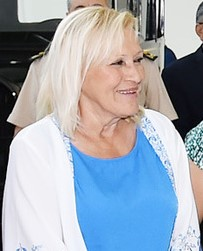

Personal information
- Born: October 31, 1943 (age 82) Baku, Azerbaijan
- Occupation: Handball player
Medal record
Women's Handball
Gold medal – first place	1976 Montreal	Team

Rafiga Mahmud qizi Shabanova (born October 31, 1943, Baku) is a former Soviet/Azerbaijani handball player who competed in the 1976 Summer Olympics.

In 1976 she won the gold medal with the Soviet team. She played three matches and scored one goal. In 2023, Shabanova received the Honorary Order award from Saleh Mammadov.
