= Tetyana Hlushchenko =

Soviet handball player (born 1956)

Olympic medal record

Women's Handball
Gold medal – first place	1976 Montreal	Team

World Championship
Silver medal – second place	1975 Soviet Union	Team
Silver medal – second place	1978 Czechoslovakia	Team

Tetyana Grygorivna Hlushchenko (Ukrainian: Тетяна Григорівна Глущенко, born July 12, 1956, in Kiev) is a former Soviet/Ukrainian handball player who competed in the 1976 Summer Olympics.

She trained at Spartak in Kiev. In 1976 she won the gold medal with the Soviet team. She played all five matches.
