= Halyna Zakharova =

Ukrainian handball player

Olympic medal record

Women's Handball
Gold medal – first place	1976 Montreal	Team

World Championship
Silver medal – second place	1975 Soviet Union	Team
Bronze medal – third place	1973 Yugoslavia	Team

Halyna Petrivna Zakharova (Ukrainian: Галина Петрівна Захарова, born March 22, 1947) is a former Soviet/Ukrainian handball player who competed in the 1976 Summer Olympics.

In 1976 she won the gold medal with the Soviet team. She played three matches including the final and scored one goal.
