= Kuriko Komori =

Japanese handball player (born 1954)

Kuriko Komori (小森 久里子, Komori Kuriko; born 30 October 1954) is a Japanese former handball player who competed in the 1976 Summer Olympics.
