= East Germany women's national handball team =

Information
- Association: German Handball Association
- Most caps: Petra Uhlig (282)
- Most goals: Katrin Mietzner (1095)

Colours
1st	2nd

Results

Summer Olympics
- Appearances: 2 (First in 1976)
- Best result: Silver medals (1976)

World Championship
- Appearances: 7 (First in 1971)
- Best result: 1 (1971, 1975, 1978)
- Last updated on .

The East Germany women's national handball team was the national handball team of East Germany. The team won the World Women's Handball Championship three times, in 1971, in 1975 and in 1978. They also won a silver medal at the 1976 Olympics and a bronze medal at the 1980 Olympics. Their last tournament was the 1990 World Women's Handball Championship, where they finished 3rd.

== Olympic Games history ==
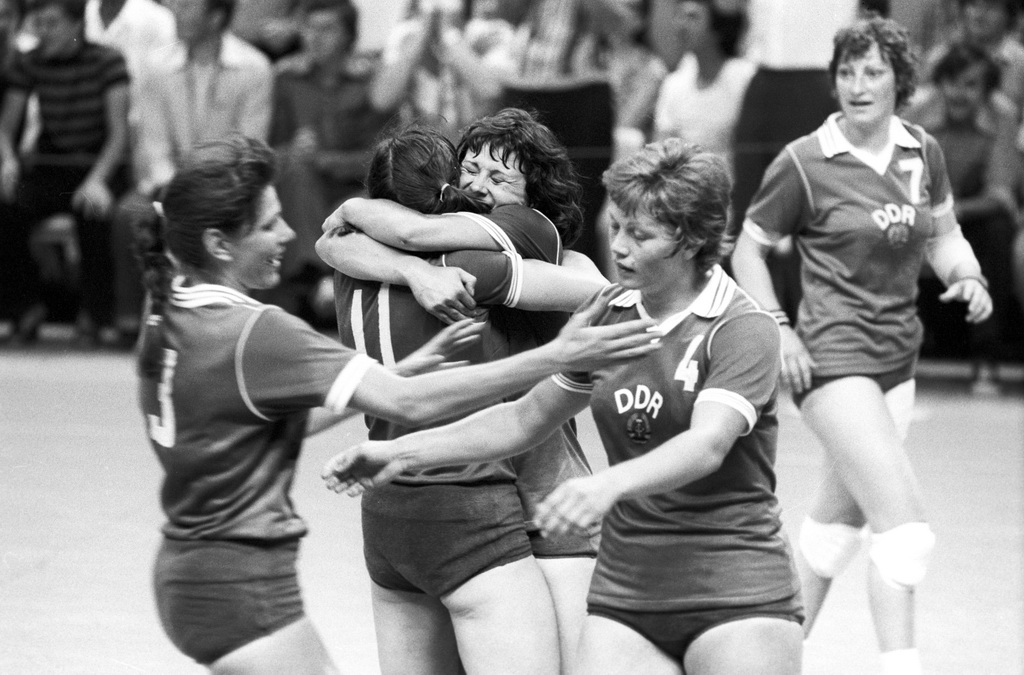
Olympics 1980

- 1976 : 2nd place
- 1980 : 3rd place

== World Championship history ==
- 1971 : Champions
- 1973 : 9th place
- 1975 : Champions
- 1978 : Champions
- 1982 : 4th place
- 1986 : 4th place
- 1990 : 3rd place

== See also ==
- Germany women's national handball team
