= Handball at the 1976 Summer Olympics =

- Handball pictogram

Tournament details
- Host country: Canada
- Dates: 18–28 July 1976
- Teams: 18

Final positions
- Champions: Soviet Union (men); Soviet Union (women)
- Runners-up: Romania (men); East Germany (women)
- Third place: Poland (men); Hungary (women)
- Fourth place: West Germany (men); Romania (women)

Team handball at the 1976 Summer Olympics featured competition for men and women. It was the first time women's handball was a part of the Olympics.

== Medal summary ==
| Event | Gold | Silver | Bronze |
|---|---|---|---|
| Men | Soviet Union Aleksandr Anpilogov; Yevgeni Chernyshov; Anatoli Fedyukin; Valeri Gassy; Vasily Ilyin; Mykhaylo Ishchenko; Yuri Kidyaev; Yuri Klimov; Vladimir Kravtsov; Serhiy Kushniryuk; Yuriy Lahutyn; Vladimir Maksimov; Oleksandr Rezanov; Mykola Tomyn | Romania Ștefan Birtalan; Adrian Cosma; Cezar Drăgăniṭă; Alexandru Fölker; Cristian Gațu; Mircea Grabovschi; Roland Gunesch; Gabriel Kicsid; Ghiță Licu; Nicolae Munteanu; Cornel Penu; Werner Stöckl; Constantin Tudosie; Radu Voina | Poland Zdzisław Antczak; Janusz Brzozowski; Piotr Cieśla; Jan Gmyrek; Alfred Kałuziński; Jerzy Klempel; Zygfryd Kuchta; Jerzy Melcer; Ryszard Przybysz; Henryk Rozmiarek; Andrzej Sokołowski; Andrzej Szymczak; Mieczysław Wojczak; Włodzimierz Zieliński |
| Women | Soviet Union Lyubov Berezhnaya; Lyudmyla Bobrus; Aldona Česaitytė; Tetyana Hlushchenko; Larysa Karlova; Mariya Litoshenko; Nina Lobova; Tetyana Makarets; Lyudmyla Panchuk; Rafiga Shabanova; Nataliya Sherstyuk; Lyudmila Shubina; Zinaida Turchyna; Halyna Zakharova | East Germany Gabriele Badorek; Hannelore Burosch; Roswitha Krause; Waltraud Kretzschmar; Evelyn Matz; Liane Michaelis; Eva Paskuy; Kristina Richter; Christina Rost; Silvia Siefert; Marion Tietz; Petra Uhlig; Christina Voß; Hannelore Zober | Hungary Éva Angyal; Mária Berzsenyi; Ágota Bujdosó; Klára Csíkné; Zsuzsanna Kéziné; Katalin Lakiné; Rozália Lelkesné; Márta Megyeriné; Ilona Nagy; Marianna Nagy; Erzsébet Németh; Amália Sterbinszky; Borbála Tóth Harsányi; Mária Vadászné |

== Participating nations ==
Each qualified country was allowed to enter one team of 14 players and they all were eligible for participation. Five nations competed in both tournaments. Japan entered only a squad of twelve women and twelve men. Only four male reserve players did not participate (one from Denmark, two from Hungary, and one from Czechoslovakia).

A total of 230(*) handball players (148 men and 82 women) from 12 nations (men from 11 nations – women from 6 nations) competed at the Montreal Games:

- Canada (28) (men:14 women:14)
- Czechoslovakia (13) (men:13 women:0)
- Denmark (13) (men:13 women:0)
- East Germany (14) (men:0 women:14)
- West Germany (14) (men:14 women:0)
- Hungary (26) (men:12 women:14)
- Japan (24) (men:12 women:12)
- Poland (14) (men:14 women:0)
- Romania (28) (men:14 women:14)
- Soviet Union (28) (men:14 women:14)
- United States (14) (men:14 women:0)
- Yugoslavia (14) (men:14 women:0)

(*) NOTE: There are only players counted, which participated in one game at least.

== Medal table ==
| Rank | Nation | Gold | Silver | Bronze | Total |
|---|---|---|---|---|---|
| 1 | Soviet Union | 2 | 0 | 0 | 2 |
| 2 | East Germany | 0 | 1 | 0 | 1 |
| 2 | Romania | 0 | 1 | 0 | 1 |
| 4 | Hungary | 0 | 0 | 1 | 1 |
| 4 | Poland | 0 | 0 | 1 | 1 |
| Totals (5 entries) | | 2 | 2 | 2 | 6 |
