= List of flag bearers for the Republic of the Congo at the Olympics =

Republic of the Congo at the Olympics
- Flag of the Republic of the Congo
- IOC code: CGO
- NOC: Comité National Olympique et Sportif Congolais
- Medals: Gold 0 Silver 0 Bronze 0 Total 0

Summer appearances
- 1964; 1968; 1972; 1976; 1980; 1984; 1988; 1992; 1996; 2000; 2004; 2008; 2012; 2016; 2020; 2024

This is a list of flag bearers who have represented the Republic of the Congo at the Olympics.

Flag bearers carry the national flag of their country at the opening ceremony of the Olympic Games.

#	Event year	Season	Flag bearer	Sport	Reference
1	1964	Summer	unknown	unknown	
2	1972	Summer	unknown	unknown	
3	1980	Summer	Solange Koulinka	Handball	
4	1984	Summer	Simone Nkabou	N/A (Chef de mission)	
5	1988	Summer	Jean-Didiace Bémou	Athletics	
6	1992	Summer	unknown	unknown	
7	1996	Summer	Léontine Tsiba	Athletics	
8	2000	Summer	Marien Michel Ngouabi	Swimming	
9	2004	Summer	Rony Bakale	Swimming	
10	2008	Summer	Pamela Mouele-Mboussi	Athletics	
11	2012	Summer	Lorene Bazolo	Athletics	
12	2016	Summer	Franck Elemba	Athletics	
13	2020	Summer	Natacha Ngoye Akamabi	Athletics	
14	2024	Summer	Freddy Mayala	Swimming	
14	2024	Summer	Natacha Ngoye Akamabi	Athletics	

== See also ==
- Congo at the Olympics
