= Republic of the Congo at the 2025 World Aquatics Championships =

- Flag of Republic of the Congo
- World Aquatics code: CGO
- National federation: Congolese Amateur Swimming Federation
- Website: www.feconat.org

in Singapore
- Competitors: 2 in 1 sport
- Medals: Gold 0 Silver 0 Bronze 0 Total 0

World Aquatics Championships appearances
- 2001; 2003; 2005; 2007; 2009; 2011; 2013; 2015; 2017–2022; 2023; 2024; 2025

Republic of the Congo is competing at the 2025 World Aquatics Championships in Singapore from 11 July to 3 August 2025.

== Competitors ==
The following is the list of competitors in the Championships.

Sport	Men	Women	Total
Swimming	1	1	2
Total	1	1	2

== Swimming ==
Men

Athlete	Event	Heat		Semifinal		Final	
Athlete	Event	Time	Rank	Time	Rank	Time	Rank
Yann Douma	50 m freestyle	27.49	102	Did not advance			

Women

Athlete	Event	Heat		Semifinal		Final	
Athlete	Event	Time	Rank	Time	Rank	Time	Rank
Vanessa Bobimbo	50 m freestyle	34.62	97	Did not advance			
