= Republic of the Congo at the 2004 Summer Olympics =

- Flag of the Republic of the Congo
- IOC code: CGO
- NOC: Congolese National Olympic and Sports Committee

in Athens
- Competitors: 6 in 4 sports
- Flag bearer: Rony Bakale
- Medals: Gold 0 Silver 0 Bronze 0 Total 0

Summer Olympics appearances (overview)
- 1964; 1968; 1972; 1976; 1980; 1984; 1988; 1992; 1996; 2000; 2004; 2008; 2012; 2016; 2020; 2024

The Republic of the Congo was represented at the 2004 Summer Olympics in Athens, Greece by the Congolese National Olympic and Sports Committee.

In total, six athletes including three men and three women represented the Republic of the Congo in four different sports including athletics, fencing, judo and swimming.

== Competitors ==
In total, six athletes represented the Republic of the Congo at the 2004 Summer Olympics in Athens, Greece across four different sports.

Sport	Men	Women	Total
Athletics	1	1	2
Fencing	1	0	1
Judo	0	1	1
Swimming	1	1	2
Total	3	3	6

== Athletics ==
In total, two Congolese athletes participated in the athletics events – Michelle Banga Moundzoula in the 200 m and Lezin Ngoyikonda in the men's 400 m.

The heats for the men's 400 m took place on 20 August 2004. Ngoyikonda did not start.

Athlete	Event	Heat		Semifinal		Final	
Athlete	Event	Result	Rank	Result	Rank	Result	Rank
Lezin Ngoyikonda	400 m	DNS		Did not advance			

The heats for the women's 200 m took place on 23 August 2004. Moundzoula finished sixth in her heat in a time of 24.37 seconds and she did not advance to the quarter-finals.

Athlete	Event	Heat		Quarterfinal		Semifinal		Final	
Athlete	Event	Result	Rank	Result	Rank	Result	Rank	Result	Rank
Michelle Banga Moundzoula	200 m	24.37	6	Did not advance					

== Fencing ==
In total, one Congolese athlete participated in the fencing events – Sorel-Arthur Kembe in the men's sabre.

The men's sabre took place on 14 August 2004. In the first round, Kembe lost to Cándido Maya of Cuba.

Athlete	Event	Round of 64	Round of 32	Round of 16	Quarterfinal	Semifinal	Final / BM	
Athlete	Event	Opposition Score	Opposition Score	Opposition Score	Opposition Score	Opposition Score	Opposition Score	Rank
Sorel-Arthur Kembe	Individual sabre	Maya (CUB); L 13–15	Did not advance					

== Judo ==
In total, one Congolese athlete participated in the judo events – Tatiana Bvegadzi in the women's +78 kg category.

The women's +78 kg category took place on 20 August 2004. In the first round, Bvegadzi lost by ippon to Daima Beltrán of Cuba. In the repechage, she lost by ippon to Karina Bryant of Great Britain.

Athlete	Event	Round of 32	Round of 16	Quarterfinals	Semifinals	Repechage 1	Repechage 2	Repechage 3	Final / BM	
Athlete	Event	Opposition Result	Opposition Result	Opposition Result	Opposition Result	Opposition Result	Opposition Result	Opposition Result	Opposition Result	Rank
Tatiana Bvegadzi	Women's +78 kg	Bye	Beltrán (CUB); L 0000–1000	Did not advance		Bryant (GBR); L 0000–1003	Did not advance			

== Swimming ==
In total, two Congolese athletes participated in the swimming events – Monika Bakale in the women's 50 m freestyle and Rony Bakale in the men's 50 m freestyle.

The heats for the men's 50 m freestyle took place on 19 August 2004. Rony Bakale finished fifth in his heat in a time of 25.07 seconds which was ultimately not fast enough to advance to the semi-finals.

Athlete	Event	Heat		Semifinal		Final	
Athlete	Event	Time	Rank	Time	Rank	Time	Rank
Rony Bakale	50 m freestyle	25.07	61	Did not advance			

The heats for the women's 50 m freestyle took place on 20 August 2004. Monika Bakale finished second in her heat in a time of 31.61 seconds which was ultimately not fast enough to advance to the semi-finals.

Athlete	Event	Heat		Semifinal		Final	
Athlete	Event	Time	Rank	Time	Rank	Time	Rank
Monika Bakale	50 m freestyle	31.61	68	Did not advance			
