= Congo at the 2020 Summer Paralympics =

- Flag of Congo
- IPC code: CGO

in Tokyo, Japan August 24, 2021 – September 5, 2021
- Competitors: 2 (1 man and 1 woman) in 1 sport
- Medals: Gold 0 Silver 0 Bronze 0 Total 0

Summer Paralympics appearances (overview)
- 1960; 1964; 1968; 1972; 1976; 1980; 1984; 1988; 1992; 1996; 2000; 2004; 2008; 2012; 2016; 2020; 2024

Congo competed at the 2020 Summer Paralympics in Tokyo, Japan, from 24 August to 5 September 2021. This was their second consecutive appearance at the Summer Paralympics since 2016.

== Competitors ==
The following is the list of number of competitors participating in the Games:

| Sport | Men | Women | Total |
|---|---|---|---|
| Athletics | 1 | 1 | 2 |
| Total | 1 | 1 | 2 |

== Athletics ==
Men's track

| Athlete | Event | Heats | | Semi-final | | Final | |
| Athlete | Event | Result | Rank | Result | Rank | Result | Rank |
|---|---|---|---|---|---|---|---|
| Emmanuel Grace Mouambako | 100m T11 | Did not start | | Did not advance | | | |

Women's field

| Athlete | Event | Final | |
| Athlete | Event | Result | Rank |
|---|---|---|---|
| Fifi Loukoula Loulendo | Shot put F57 | 5.13 | 16 |

== See also ==
- Congo at the Paralympics
- Republic of the Congo at the 2020 Summer Olympics
