= Republic of the Congo at the 2012 Summer Olympics =

- Flag of the Republic of the Congo
- IOC code: CGO
- NOC: Comité National Olympique et Sportif Congolais

in London
- Competitors: 7 in 3 sports
- Flag bearers: Lorène Bazolo (opening); Aminata Aboubakar Yacoub (closing)
- Medals: Gold 0 Silver 0 Bronze 0 Total 0

Summer Olympics appearances (overview)
- 1964; 1968; 1972; 1976; 1980; 1984; 1988; 1992; 1996; 2000; 2004; 2008; 2012; 2016; 2020; 2024

Congo competed at the 2012 Summer Olympics in London, United Kingdom from 27 July to 12 August 2012. This was the nation's eleventh appearance at the Olympics, excluding the 1968 Summer Olympics in Mexico City, and the 1976 Summer Olympics in Montreal because of the African boycott.

Comité National Olympique et Sportif Congolais sent the nation's largest delegation after the 1992 Summer Olympics in Barcelona. 7 athletes, 4 men and 3 women, were selected to the team, participating only in athletics, swimming, and table tennis. Among the athletes, swimmer Emile Bakale and table tennis player Suraju Saka competed only at their second consecutive Olympics. Sprinter Lorène Bazolo, on the other hand, was the nation's flag bearer at the opening ceremony. Congo, however, has yet to win its first Olympic medal.

== Athletics ==
Men

Athlete	Event	Heat		Quarterfinal		Semifinal		Final	
Athlete	Event	Result	Rank	Result	Rank	Result	Rank	Result	Rank
Devilert Arsene Kimbembe	100 m	10.68	2 Q	10.94	8	Did not advance			

Women

Athlete	Event	Heat		Quarterfinal		Semifinal		Final	
Athlete	Event	Result	Rank	Result	Rank	Result	Rank	Result	Rank
Lorène Bazolo	100 m	11.87	1 Q	11.90	8	Did not advance			

Key

- Note–Ranks given for track events are within the athlete's heat only
- Q = Qualified for the next round
- q = Qualified for the next round as a fastest loser or, in field events, by position without achieving the qualifying target
- NR = National record
- N/A = Round not applicable for the event
- Bye = Athlete not required to compete in round

== Swimming ==
Congo has gained two "Universality places" from the FINA.

Men

Athlete	Event	Heat		Semifinal		Final	
Athlete	Event	Time	Rank	Time	Rank	Time	Rank
Emile Bakale	50 m freestyle	25.64	43	Did not advance			

Women

Athlete	Event	Heat		Semifinal		Final	
Athlete	Event	Time	Rank	Time	Rank	Time	Rank
Aminata Aboubakar Yacoub	50 m freestyle	34.64	69	Did not advance			

== Table tennis ==
Congo has qualified three athletes.

Athlete	Event	Preliminary round	Round 1	Round 2	Round 3	Round 4	Quarterfinals	Semifinals	Final / BM	
Athlete	Event	Opposition Result	Opposition Result	Opposition Result	Opposition Result	Opposition Result	Opposition Result	Opposition Result	Opposition Result	Rank
Saheed Idowu	Men's singles	Al-Hasan (KUW); L 2–4	Did not advance							
Suraju Saka	Men's singles	Bye	Liu S (ARG); L 0–4	Did not advance						
Xing Han	Women's singles	Bye	Privalova (BLR); L 2–4	Did not advance						
