= Republic of the Congo at the 1964 Summer Olympics =

- Flag of the Republic of the Congo
- IOC code: CGO
- NOC: Comité National Olympique et Sportif Congolais

in Tokyo, Japan October 10–24, 1964
- Competitors: 2 in 1 sport
- Medals: Gold 0 Silver 0 Bronze 0 Total 0

Summer Olympics appearances (overview)
- 1964; 1968; 1972; 1976; 1980; 1984; 1988; 1992; 1996; 2000; 2004; 2008; 2012; 2016; 2020; 2024

The Republic of the Congo competed in the Olympic Games for the first time at the 1964 Summer Olympics in Tokyo, Japan. The Games were hosted from October 10, 1964, to October 24, 1964. The delegation of Congo consisted of two athletes. Congo did not receive medals at the 1964 Summer Olympics.

== Athletics ==
Men
Track & road events

Athlete	Event	Heat		Quarterfinal		Semifinal		Final	
Athlete	Event	Result	Rank	Result	Rank	Result	Rank	Result	Rank
Léon Yombe	100 m	10.8	5	did not advance					

Field events

Athlete	Event	Qualification		Final	
Athlete	Event	Distance	Position	Distance	Position
Henri Elendé	High jump	2.06	1 Q	1.90	20
