= Republic of the Congo at the 1972 Summer Olympics =

- Flag of the Republic of the Congo
- IOC code: CGO
- NOC: Comité National Olympique et Sportif Congolais

in Munich. West Germany August 26–September 11, 1972
- Medals: Gold 0 Silver 0 Bronze 0 Total 0

Summer Olympics appearances (overview)
- 1964; 1968; 1972; 1976; 1980; 1984; 1988; 1992; 1996; 2000; 2004; 2008; 2012; 2016; 2020; 2024

The People's Republic of the Congo competed at the 1972 Summer Olympics in Munich, West Germany. The nation returned to the Olympic Games after missing the 1968 Summer Olympics.

== Results by event ==
=== Athletics ===
Men's 100 metres

- Alphonse Yanghat
  - First Heat — 10.95s (→ did not advance)

Men's 800 metres

- Alphonse Mandonda
  - Heat — 1:51.2 (→ did not advance)

Men's 4 × 100 m Relay

- Antoine Ntsana Nkounkou, Luis Nkanza, Jean-Pierre Bassegela, and Théophile Nkounkou
  - Heat — 39.86s
  - Semifinals — 39.97s (→ did not advance)
