= Republic of the Congo at the 2016 Summer Paralympics =

- Flag of the Republic of the Congo
- IPC code: CGO
- NPC: Comité National Olympique et Sportif Congolais

in Rio de Janeiro
- Competitors: 1 in 1 sports
- Flag bearer: Bardy Bouesso
- Medals: Gold 0 Silver 0 Bronze 0 Total 0

Summer Paralympics appearances (overview)
- 2016; 2020; 2024

The Republic of the Congo competed at the 2016 Summer Paralympics in Rio de Janeiro, Brazil, from 7 September to 18 September 2016. The country made its debut appearance in the Paralympics at Rio, though they had participated in eleven Summer Olympics prior to the opening of the 2016 Paralympics. They sent a single competitor, track and field athlete Bardy Bouesso. Bouesso was the flagbearer at the opening ceremony.

== Background ==
The Republic of the Congo first competed in the Summer Olympics at the 1964 Summer Olympics in Tokyo, Japan. They have participated in every Summer Olympics since, excluding the 1968 Summer Olympics and the 1976 Summer Olympics. The 2016 Summer Paralympics were held from 7 September to 18 September 2016. The Republic of the Congo was one of six countries to make their debut appearance in the Paralympic Games; the others were Aruba, Malawi, São Tomé and Príncipe, Somalia, and Togo. Bardy Bouesso, the only competitor in the delegation, was chosen as the flagbearer for the parade of nations during the opening ceremony, held on 7 September 2016.

== Disability classifications ==
Every participant at the Paralympics has their disability grouped into one of five disability categories; amputation, the condition may be congenital or sustained through injury or illness; cerebral palsy; wheelchair athletes, there is often overlap between this and other categories; visual impairment, including blindness; Les autres, any physical disability that does not fall strictly under one of the other categories, for example dwarfism or multiple sclerosis. Each Paralympic sport then has its own classifications, dependent upon the specific physical demands of competition. Events are given a code, made of numbers and letters, describing the type of event and classification of the athletes competing. Some sports, such as athletics, divide athletes by both the category and severity of their disabilities, other sports, for example swimming, group competitors from different categories together, the only separation being based on the severity of the disability.

== Athletics ==
Bouesso was 19 years old at the time of the competition. He was born on 21 July 1997. He is placed into disability classification F44, which is defined by the International Paralympic Committee as being for "any athlete competing without a prosthesis with a unilateral or a combination of lower limb impairment/s where the impairment in only one limb meets the minimum impairment criteria. Functional loss is seen in one foot, ankle and/or lower leg. The activity limitation in Para Athletics is roughly comparable to that found in an athlete with one through ankle / below knee amputation."

He competed in both the javelin throw, held on 9 September, and the discus throw, held two days later. In the javelin throw, he recorded a mark of 29.72 metres, the best result he had recorded that season. He finished in fifteenth place, in a field of sixteen competitors. In the discus throw, he recorded a personal best mark of 20.38 metres, however, this was not enough to pull him out of last place among all nine competitors who started the event.

Men's Field

Athlete	Events	Result	Rank
Bardy Bouesso	Discus F43-44	20.38	9
Bardy Bouesso	Javelin F42-44	29.72	15

== See also ==
- Congo at the 2016 Summer Olympics
