= Republic of the Congo at the 2008 Summer Olympics =

- Flag of the Republic of the Congo
- IOC code: CGO
- NOC: Comité National Olympique et Sportif Congolais

in Beijing
- Competitors: 5 in 3 sports
- Flag bearer: Pamela Mouele-Mboussi
- Medals: Gold 0 Silver 0 Bronze 0 Total 0

Summer Olympics appearances (overview)
- 1964; 1968; 1972; 1976; 1980; 1984; 1988; 1992; 1996; 2000; 2004; 2008; 2012; 2016; 2020; 2024; 2028

The Republic of the Congo sent a delegation to compete at the 2008 Summer Olympics in Beijing, China.

== Athletics ==
Men

Ghyd-Kermeliss-Holly Olonghot represented the Republic of the Congo in the men's 100 meters races at the Beijing Olympics, and was the only athlete from the Republic of the Congo participating in a track event. Born in the national capital Brazzaville in 1986, Olonghot was 22 years old at the time of the Beijing Olympics. He had not previously competed at any Olympic games. The Congolese runner competed in the eight-person fourth heat during the August 14 qualification round. He finished the race in 11.01 seconds, placing seventh in the heat ahead of Afghan athlete Masoud Azizi (11.45 seconds) and behind Burkina Faso's Idrissa Sanou (10.63 seconds) in a heat dominated by Michael Frater of Jamaica (10.15 seconds) and Pierre Browne of Canada (10.22 seconds). Of the 80 athletes who competed in the races, Ghyd-Kermeliss-Holly Olonghot placed 65th. He did not advance to later rounds.

Athlete	Event	Heat		Quarterfinal		Semifinal		Final	
Athlete	Event	Result	Rank	Result	Rank	Result	Rank	Result	Rank
Ghyd-Kermeliss-Holly Olonghot	100 m	11.01	7	did not advance					

Women

Pamela Mouele-Mboussi competed on the behalf of the Republic of the Congo at the Beijing Olympics as its only field athlete at those games. Born in Brazzaville in May 1988, Mouele-Mboussi was 20 years old when she competed at her event at the Beijing Olympics. The Congolese athlete had not previously competed at any Olympic games. During the qualifying round of women's long jump, which took place on August 18, Mouele-Mboussi competed against 20 athletes in the first group. The Congolese long jumper fouled on her first attempt, but jumped 5.94 meters on her second (temporarily placing her ranking at 14th) and boosted her score further by jumping 6.06 meters on her last attempt. With a score of 6.06 meters, Pamela Mouele-Mboussi ranked 17th out of the 19 athletes who ranked in the event. Mouele-Mboussi ranked directly ahead of Rhonda Watkins of Trinidad and Tobago (5.88 meters) and directly behind Volha Cyargeenka of Belarus (6.25 meters) in a heat led by Brazil's Maurren Higa Maggi (6.79 meters) and Sweden's Carolina Klüft (6.70 meters). Of the 38 finishing athletes in the qualifying round, Mouele-Mboussi ranked 35th. She did not advance to later rounds.

Athlete	Event	Qualification		Final	
Athlete	Event	Distance	Position	Distance	Position
Pamela Mouele-Mboussi	Long jump	6.06 NR	35	did not advance	

Key

- Note–Ranks given for track events are within the athlete's heat only
- Q = Qualified for the next round
- q = Qualified for the next round as a fastest loser or, in field events, by position without achieving the qualifying target
- NR = National record
- N/A = Round not applicable for the event
- Bye = Athlete not required to compete in round

== Swimming ==
Men

Emile Rony Bakale competed for the Republic of the Congo as its only swimmer at the Beijing games, and participated in the men's 100 meters freestyle. Born in 1987 and brother of fellow Congolese Olympian Monika Bakale, Rony Bakale first competed at the 2004 Summer Olympics in Athens, Greece as a 16-year-old in the men's 50 meters freestyle. At the age of 20, he returned to the Olympics, but not to the men's 50 meters freestyle. During the preliminary rounds of his event, Bakale competed in the first heat against two other athletes. The Congolese swimmer finished the event in 55.08 seconds, placing first in his heat ahead of Bolivia's Miguel Angel Navarro (56.89 seconds) and Libya's Sofyan El Gadi (57.89 seconds). Of the 64 athletes who finished the event's preliminary round, Bakale finished 62nd. He did not advance to later rounds.

Athlete	Event	Heat		Semifinal		Final	
Athlete	Event	Time	Rank	Time	Rank	Time	Rank
Emile Rony Bakale	100 m freestyle	55.08	62	did not advance			

== Table tennis ==
Suraju Saka was one of the Republic of the Congo's competitors in table tennis at the Beijing Olympics. He was born in Nigeria in 1976 and entered the Olympics in 2008 on Brazzaville's behalf at the age of 32. Suraju Saka had not previously competed at any Olympic games. During the first round of the event, which took place on August 19, Saka faced Lucjan Blaszczyk of Poland in the ninth match. In the first match, Saka lost 11–9; he lost 11–3 in the second; 13–11 in the third; and 11–2 in the final match. Having lost all four games to his Polish opponent, Saka was defeated and did not advance to later rounds.

Yang Fen competed under the flag of the Republic of the Congo at the Beijing Olympics as one of its table tennis players. Born in Hubei Province in central China in 1982, Yang was 26 years old at the time of her participation in the Beijing games. She had not previously competed at any Olympic games. At the preliminary round of the event, which took place on August 17, Yang faced the United States' Crystal Huang. During the first game, Yang defeated Huang 11–6; Yang defeated the American again 11–4 on the second round, but lost to Huang in the third round 6–11. The Congolese athlete won the fourth game 11–9, but lost the next two games 8–11. However, her victory in the seventh game at 11–7 secured her victory and progression to the next round. The first round of the event took place on August 19, with Yang in the first match challenging Elizabeta Samara of Romania. Samara defeated Yang in the first two games (11–4 then 11–2). The Congolese table tennis player won the third game 6–11, but lost the next two games (11–4 and 11–6) and, having lost four games, was defeated. Yang Fen did not advance to later rounds.

Athlete	Event	Preliminary round	Round 1	Round 2	Round 3	Round 4	Quarterfinals	Semifinals	Final / BM	
Athlete	Event	Opposition Result	Opposition Result	Opposition Result	Opposition Result	Opposition Result	Opposition Result	Opposition Result	Opposition Result	Rank
Suraju Saka	Men's singles	Kou L (UKR); W 4–1	Błaszczyk (POL); L 0–4	did not advance						
Yang Fen	Women's singles	Huang (USA); W 4–2	Samara (ROU); L 1–4	did not advance						
