= Republic of the Congo at the 2011 World Aquatics Championships =

- Flag of the Republic of the Congo
- FINA code: CGO
- National federation: Congolese Amateur Swimming Federation
- Website: www.feconat.org

in Shanghai, China
- Competitors: 3 in 1 sports
- Medals: Gold 0 Silver 0 Bronze 0 Total 0

World Aquatics Championships appearances
- 2001; 2003; 2005; 2007; 2009; 2011; 2013; 2015; 2017–2022; 2023; 2024

The Republic of the Congo competed at the 2011 World Aquatics Championships in Shanghai, China between July 16 and 31, 2011.

== Swimming ==
Congo qualified 3 swimmers.

Men

Athlete	Event	Heats		Semifinals		Final	
Athlete	Event	Time	Rank	Time	Rank	Time	Rank
Anauska Ndinga	50 m freestyle	29.24	104	did not advance			
Emile Bakale	50 m freestyle	25.38	67	did not advance			
Emile Bakale	50 m backstroke	28.34	30	did not advance			

Women

Athlete	Event	Heats		Semifinals		Final	
Athlete	Event	Time	Rank	Time	Rank	Time	Rank
Aminata Aboubakar Yacoub	50 m freestyle	37.07	80	did not advance			
