= Republic of the Congo at the 2023 World Aquatics Championships =

- Flag of the Republic of the Congo
- FINA code: CGO
- National federation: Congolese Amateur Swimming Federation
- Website: www.feconat.org

in Fukuoka, Japan
- Competitors: 2 in 1 sport

World Aquatics Championships appearances
- 2001; 2003; 2005; 2007; 2009; 2011; 2013; 2015; 2017–2022; 2023; 2024

Republic of the Congo is set to compete at the 2023 World Aquatics Championships in Fukuoka, Japan from 14 to 30 July.

== Swimming ==
Republic of the Congo entered 2 swimmers.

Men

Athlete	Event	Heat		Semifinal		Final	
Athlete	Event	Time	Rank	Time	Rank	Time	Rank
Freddy Mayala	50 metre freestyle	28.61	113	Did not advance			

Women

Athlete	Event	Heat		Semifinal		Final	
Athlete	Event	Time	Rank	Time	Rank	Time	Rank
Vanessa Bobimbo	50 metre freestyle	37.37	100	Did not advance			
