= Republic of the Congo at the 1984 Summer Olympics =

- Flag of the People's Republic of the Congo
- IOC code: CGO
- NOC: Comité National Olympique et Sportif Congolais

in Los Angeles. United States July 28–August 12, 1984
- Competitors: 10
- Flag bearer: Simone Nkabou
- Medals: Gold 0 Silver 0 Bronze 0 Total 0

Summer Olympics appearances (overview)
- 1964; 1968; 1972; 1976; 1980; 1984; 1988; 1992; 1996; 2000; 2004; 2008; 2012; 2016; 2020; 2024

The People's Republic of the Congo competed at the 1984 Summer Olympics in Los Angeles, United States.

== Results by event ==
=== Athletics ===
Men's 100 metres

- Henri Ndinga
  - Heat — 10.66 (→ did not advance)

Men's 400 metres

- Jean Didace Bemou
  - Heat — 46.26 (→ did not advance)

=== Judo ===
Half Lightweight

- Bienvenu Mbida (=14th)

Half Middleweight

- Christophe Wogo (=20th)

Middleweight

- Séraphin Okuaka (=18th)
