= Republic of the Congo at the 2015 World Aquatics Championships =

- Flag of the Republic of the Congo
- FINA code: CGO
- National federation: Congolese Amateur Swimming Federation
- Website: www.feconat.org

in Kazan, Russia
- Competitors: 3 in 1 sport
- Medals: Gold 0 Silver 0 Bronze 0 Total 0

World Aquatics Championships appearances
- 2001; 2003; 2005; 2007; 2009; 2011; 2013; 2015; 2017–2022; 2023; 2024

The Republic of the Congo competed at the 2015 World Aquatics Championships in Kazan, Russia from 24 July to 9 August 2015.

== Swimming ==
Congolese swimmers have achieved qualifying standards in the following events (up to a maximum of 2 swimmers in each event at the A-standard entry time, and 1 at the B-standard):

Men

Athlete	Event	Heat		Semifinal		Final	
Athlete	Event	Time	Rank	Time	Rank	Time	Rank
Rony Bakale	100 m freestyle	58.64	102	did not advance			
Dienov Koka	50 m freestyle	28.53	108	did not advance			
Dienov Koka	50 m butterfly	30.20	70	did not advance			

Women

Athlete	Event	Heat		Semifinal		Final	
Athlete	Event	Time	Rank	Time	Rank	Time	Rank
Bellore Sangala	50 m freestyle	35.74	104	did not advance			
Bellore Sangala	50 m breaststroke	42.48	65	did not advance			
