= Republic of the Congo at the Paralympics =

- IPC code: CGO
- NPC: Paralympic Committee of Congo
- Medals: Gold 0 Silver 0 Bronze 0 Total 0

Summer appearances
- 2016; 2020; 2024

The Republic of the Congo made its Paralympic Games début at the 2016 Summer Paralympics in Rio de Janeiro, sending a single representative (Bardy Chris Bouesso) to compete in athletics.

The Republic of the Congo has never taken part in the Winter Paralympics.

== See also ==
- Republic of the Congo at the Olympics
