= List of flag bearers for Congo at the Olympics =

Republic of the Congo Democratic Republic of the Congo

List of flag bearers for Congo at the Olympics may refer to:

- List of flag bearers for the Republic of the Congo at the Olympics
- List of flag bearers for the Democratic Republic of the Congo at the Olympics
