= Republic of the Congo at the 2024 Summer Paralympics =

- IPC code: CGO

in Paris, France August 28, 2024 – September 8, 2024
- Competitors: 2 (1 man and 1 woman) in 1 sport
- Flag bearers: Emmanuel Grace Mouambako; Mireille Nganga
- Medals: Gold 0 Silver 0 Bronze 0 Total 0

Summer Paralympics appearances
- 2016; 2020; 2024

The Republic of the Congo competed at the 2024 Summer Paralympics in Paris, France, from 28 August to 8 September 2024. This was the nation's third time competing at the Summer Paralympic Games after it made its debut at the 2016 Summer Paralympics. The delegation consisted of two competitors from one sport.

== Competitors ==
The following is the list of number of competitors in the Games.

Sport	Men	Women	Total
Athletics	1	1	2
Total	1	1	2

== Athletics ==
Athlete	Event	Heat/Qualification		Final	
Athlete	Event	Result	Rank	Result	Rank
Mireille Nganga	Women's shot put F57	NM		Did not advance	
Mireille Nganga	Women's javelin throw F56	NM		Did not advance	
Emmanuel Grace Mouambako Guide: Sharon Victor Loussanga	Men's 100 metres T11	12.07	4	Did not advance	

== See also ==
- Republic of the Congo at the 2024 Summer Olympics
- Republic of the Congo at the Paralympics
