= Republic of the Congo at the 1992 Summer Olympics =

- Flag of the Republic of the Congo
- IOC code: CGO
- NOC: Comité National Olympique et Sportif Congolais

in Barcelona, Spain 25 July–9 August 1992
- Competitors: 7 in 2 sports
- Medals: Gold 0 Silver 0 Bronze 0 Total 0

Summer Olympics appearances (overview)
- 1964; 1968; 1972; 1976; 1980; 1984; 1988; 1992; 1996; 2000; 2004; 2008; 2012; 2016; 2020; 2024

The Republic of the Congo competed at the 1992 Summer Olympics in Barcelona, Spain.

== Competitors ==
The following is the list of number of competitors in the Games.

Sport	Men	Women	Total
Athletics	5	1	6
Swimming	1	0	1
Total	6	1	7

== Athletics ==
Men
Track and road events

Athlete	Event	Heats		Quarterfinal		Semifinal		Final	
Athlete	Event	Result	Rank	Result	Rank	Result	Rank	Result	Rank
David Nkoua	100 metres	10.96	58	Did not advance					
Médard Makanga	200 metres	22.18	66	Did not advance					
Médard Makanga	400 metres	48.17	54	Did not advance					
Symphorien Samba	800 metres	1:51.75	42	—		Did not advance			
Médard Makanga; Michael Dzong; Armand Biniakounou (Note: He competed in the same discipline in the 1988 Summer Olympics); David Nkoua	4 × 100 metres relay	DQ		—		Did not advance			

Women
Track and road events

Athlete	Event	Heats		Quarterfinal		Semifinal		Final	
Athlete	Event	Result	Rank	Result	Rank	Result	Rank	Result	Rank
Addo Ndala	400 metres hurdles	DNF		—		Did not advance			

== Swimming ==
Men

Athlete	Event	Heats		Final A/B	
Athlete	Event	Time	Rank	Time	Rank
Gilles Coudray	50 metre freestyle	28.11	69	Did not advance	

== Sources ==
- Official Olympic Reports
