= Judo at the 2004 Summer Olympics – Women's +78 kg =

Women's +78 kg at the Games of the XXVIII Olympiad
- Venue: Ano Liossia Olympic Hall
- Dates: 20 August 2004
- Competitors: 22 from 22 nations
- Winning score: 1000

Medalists
1st place, gold medalist(s)		Maki Tsukada	Japan
2nd place, silver medalist(s)		Daima Beltrán	Cuba
3rd place, bronze medalist(s)		Tea Donguzashvili	Russia
3rd place, bronze medalist(s)		Sun Fuming	China

Women's +78 kg competition in judo at the 2004 Summer Olympics was held on August 20 at the Ano Liossia Olympic Hall.

This event was the heaviest of the women's judo weight classes, allowing competitors with over 78 kilograms of body mass. Like all other judo events, bouts lasted five minutes. If the bout was still tied at the end, it was extended for another five-minute, sudden-death period; if neither judoka scored during that period, the match is decided by the judges. The tournament bracket consisted of a single-elimination contest culminating in a gold medal match. There was also a repechage to determine the winners of the two bronze medals. Each judoka who had lost to a semifinalist competed in the repechage. The two judokas who lost in the semifinals faced the winner of the opposite half of the bracket's repechage in bronze medal bouts.

== Schedule ==
All times are Greece Standard Time (UTC+2)

Date	Time	Round
Friday, 20 August 2004	10:30; 13:00; 17:00	Preliminaries; Repechage; Final

== Qualifying athletes ==
Mat	Athlete	Country
1	Karina Bryant	Great Britain
1	Daima Beltrán	Cuba
1	Tatiana Bvegadzi	Republic of the Congo
1	Éva Bisséni	France
1	Eleni Patsiou	Greece
1	Giovanna Blanco	Venezuela
1	Carmen Chalá	Ecuador
1	Lucija Polavder	Slovenia
1	Sandra Köppen	Germany
1	Insaf Yahyaoui	Tunisia
1	Sun Fuming	China
2	Barbara Andolina	Italy
2	Tsvetana Bozhilova	Bulgaria
2	Vanessa Zambotti	Mexico
2	Choi Sook-ie	South Korea
2	Tea Donguzashvili	Russia
2	Samah Ramadan	Egypt
2	Jessica Malone	Australia
2	Maki Tsukada	Japan
2	Maryna Prokofyeva	Ukraine
2	Erdene-Ochiryn Dolgormaa	Mongolia
2	Lee Hsiao-hung	Chinese Taipei

== Tournament results ==
=== Final ===
Final
1	Daima Beltrán (CUB)	0100
2	Maki Tsukada (JPN)	1000

=== Mat 1 ===
Round of 32
Karina Bryant (GBR)	0010
Daima Beltrán (CUB)	0030
Éva Bisséni (FRA)	1000
Eleni Patsiou (GRE)	0000
Lucija Polavder (SLO)	0000
Sandra Köppen (GER)	1010

Round of 16
Daima Beltrán (CUB)	1000
Tatiana Bvegadzi (CGO)	0000
Éva Bisséni (FRA)	0000
Giovanna Blanco (VEN)	0002
Carmen Chalá (ECU)	0010
Sandra Köppen (GER)	0001
Insaf Yahyaoui (TUN)	0000
Sun Fuming (CHN)	1010

Quarterfinals
Daima Beltrán (CUB)	1001
Giovanna Blanco (VEN)	0000
Carmen Chalá (ECU)	0000
Sun Fuming (CHN)	1000

Semifinals
Daima Beltrán (CUB)	1000
Sun Fuming (CHN)	0000

=== Mat 2 ===
Round of 32
Tsvetana Bozhilova (BUL)	0000
Vanessa Zambotti (MEX)	1010
Tea Donguzashvili (RUS)	1001
Samah Ramadan (EGY)	0001
Erdene-Ochiryn Dolgormaa (MGL)	0021
Lee Hsiao-hung (TPE)	0001

Round of 16
Barbara Andolina (ITA)	1021
Vanessa Zambotti (MEX)	0000
Choi Sook-ie (KOR)	0001
Tea Donguzashvili (RUS)	1100
Jessica Malone (AUS)	0000
Maki Tsukada (JPN)	1000
Maryna Prokofyeva (UKR)	0200
Erdene-Ochiryn Dolgormaa (MGL)	0001

Quarterfinals
Barbara Andolina (ITA)	0001
Tea Donguzashvili (RUS)	1010
Maki Tsukada (JPN)	1012
Maryna Prokofyeva (UKR)	0000

Semifinals
Tea Donguzashvili (RUS)	0000
Maki Tsukada (JPN)	0210

=== Repechage ===
Those judoka eliminated in earlier rounds by the four semifinalists of the main bracket advanced to the repechage. These matches determined the two bronze medalists for the event.

First round
Karina Bryant (GBR)	1003
Tatiana Bvegadzi (CGO)	0000
Samah Ramadan (EGY)	0000
Choi Sook-Ie (KOR)	1000

Second round
Karina Bryant (GBR)	0020
Giovanna Blanco (VEN)	0111
Insaf Yahyaoui (TUN)	0120
Carmen Chalá (ECU)	0000
Choi Sook-ie (KOR)	0020
Barbara Andolina (ITA)	0001
Jessica Malone (AUS)	0000
Maryna Prokofyeva (UKR)	1000

Third round
Giovanna Blanco (VEN)	0000
Insaf Yahyaoui (TUN)	1012
Choi Sook-ie (KOR)	0000
Maryna Prokofyeva (UKR)	1000

Bronze medal finals
Insaf Yahyaoui (TUN)	0000
Tea Donguzashvili (RUS)	0210
Maryna Prokofyeva (UKR)	0000
Sun Fuming (CHN)	1000
