= Republic of the Congo at the 2013 World Aquatics Championships =

- Flag of the Republic of the Congo
- FINA code: CGO
- National federation: Congolese Amateur Swimming Federation
- Website: www.feconat.org

in Barcelona, Spain
- Competitors: 2 in 1 sports
- Medals: Gold 0 Silver 0 Bronze 0 Total 0

World Aquatics Championships appearances
- 2001; 2003; 2005; 2007; 2009; 2011; 2013; 2015; 2017–2022; 2023; 2024

The Republic of the Congo competed at the 2013 World Aquatics Championships in Barcelona, Spain, from 19 July to 4 August 2013.

== Swimming ==
Congolese swimmers achieved qualifying standards in the following events (up to a maximum of 2 swimmers in each event at the A-standard entry time, and 1 at the B-standard):

Men

Athlete	Event	Heat		Semifinal		Final	
Athlete	Event	Time	Rank	Time	Rank	Time	Rank
Kurt Oniangue	50 m freestyle	33.15	105	did not advance			
Kurt Oniangue	50 m breaststroke	39.98	79	did not advance			

Women

Athlete	Event	Heat		Semifinal		Final	
Athlete	Event	Time	Rank	Time	Rank	Time	Rank
Stephane Sangala	50 m freestyle	DNS		did not advance			
