= Republic of the Congo at the 2024 World Aquatics Championships =

- Flag of the Republic of the Congo
- FINA code: CGO
- National federation: Congolese Amateur Swimming Federation
- Website: www.feconat.org

in Doha, Qatar
- Competitors: 1 in 1 sport
- Medals: Gold 0 Silver 0 Bronze 0 Total 0

World Aquatics Championships appearances
- 2001; 2003; 2005; 2007; 2009; 2011; 2013; 2015; 2017–2022; 2023; 2024

Republic of the Congo competed at the 2024 World Aquatics Championships in Doha, Qatar from 2 to 18 February.

== Competitors ==
The following is the list of competitors in the Championships.

Sport	Men	Women	Total
Swimming	1	0	1
Total	1	0	1

== Swimming ==
Republic of the Congo entered 1 swimmers.

Men

Athlete	Event	Heat		Semifinal		Final	
Athlete	Event	Time	Rank	Time	Rank	Time	Rank
Yann Emmanuel Douma	50 metre freestyle	27.87	107	Did not advance			
