= Flag of the Congo =

Flag of the Congo may refer to:

- Flag of the Republic of the Congo
- Flag of the Democratic Republic of the Congo
