= Miyazaki (surname) =

Miyazaki is a Japanese surname. Notable people with the surname include:

- Aoi Miyazaki (宮﨑 あおい; born 1985), Japanese actress
- Ayane Miyazaki (born 2002), Japanese Nordic combined skier
- Ayumi Miyazaki (born 1971), Japanese singer and songwriter
- Amisa Miyazaki (宮崎あみさ; born 2002), Japanese singer, gravure idol, fashion model, and actress
- Daisuke Miyazaki (born 1981), Japanese team handball player
- George Miyasaki (1935–2013), American visual artist, painter, and printmaker, of Japanese descent
- Gorō Miyazaki (born 1967), son of Hayao Miyazaki; filmmaker, and landscaper
- Hayao Miyazaki (born 1941), Japanese animator
- Hideki Miyazaki (宮崎 秀基; born 1962), Japanese Nordic combined skier
- Hidetaka Miyazaki (born 1974), Japanese video game director, President of FromSoftware
- Junma Miyazaki (宮崎 純真; born 2000), Japanese footballer
- Kinya Miyazaki (宮崎 欣也; born 1938), Japanese high jumper
- Manabu Miyazaki (1945–2022), Japanese writer
- Manabu Miyazaki (photographer) (born 1949), Japanese wildlife photographer
- Masajiro Miyazaki (1899–1984), Japanese-Canadian osteopath
- Miho Miyazaki (born 1993), Japanese idol singer, AKB48 member
- Norihiko Miyazaki (born 1969), Japanese volleyball player
- Osamu Miyazaki (born 1966), Japanese motorcycle Grand Prix champion
- Shinji Miyazaki (born 1956), Japanese composer
- Tomohiko Miyazaki (宮崎 智彦; born 1986), Japanese footballer
- Toyotaro Miyazaki (1944–2021), American karateka
- Tsutomu Miyazaki (1962–2008), Japanese cannibalistic serial killer and necrophile
- Yoshihiro Miyazaki (宮崎 宣宏; born 1930), Japanese ice hockey player
- Yoshinobu Miyazaki (born 1978), Japanese breaststroke swimmer
- Yuriko Miyazaki (born 1995), Japanese-British tennis player

== Fictional characters ==
- Miko Miyazaki, a character from The Order of the Stick
- Nana Miyazaki (宮崎奈々, Miyazaki Nana), a character in the Light Novel Series Arifureta
- Nodoka Miyazaki, a character from the manga and anime series Negima! Magister Negi Magi

== See also ==
- George Miyasaki (1935–2013), American artist and art educator
