= Republic of the Congo at the 1996 Summer Olympics =

- Flag of the Republic of the Congo
- IOC code: CGO
- NOC: Comité National Olympique et Sportif Congolais

in Atlanta
- Competitors: 5 in 3 sports
- Flag bearer: Léontine Tsiba
- Medals: Gold 0 Silver 0 Bronze 0 Total 0

Summer Olympics appearances (overview)
- 1964; 1968; 1972; 1976; 1980; 1984; 1988; 1992; 1996; 2000; 2004; 2008; 2012; 2016; 2020; 2024

The Republic of the Congo competed at the 1996 Summer Olympics in Atlanta, United States.

== Competitors ==
The following is the list of number of competitors in the Games.

Sport	Men	Women	Total
Athletics	1	1	2
Judo	1	0	1
Swimming	1	1	2
Total	3	2	5

== Results per event ==
=== Athletics ===
==== Men ====
Track and road events

Athletes	Events	Heat Round 1		Heat Round 2		Semifinal		Final	
Athletes	Events	Time	Rank	Time	Rank	Time	Rank	Time	Rank
Hakim Mazou	110 metres hurdles	14.52	57	did not advance					

==== Women ====
Track and road events

Athletes	Events	Heat Round 1		Heat Round 2		Semifinal		Final	
Athletes	Events	Time	Rank	Time	Rank	Time	Rank	Time	Rank
Léontine Tsiba	800 metres	2:08.58	31	N/A		did not advance			

=== Judo ===
Men

Athlete	Event	Result
Abel Ndenguet	Middleweight	21

=== Swimming ===
Men

Athletes	Events	Heat		Finals	
Athletes	Events	Time	Rank	Time	Rank
René Makosso	50 m freestyle	30.00	62	Did not advance	

Women

Athletes	Events	Heat		Finals	
Athletes	Events	Time	Rank	Time	Rank
Monika Bakale	50 m freestyle	34.43	54	Did not advance	
