= Tatiana Bvegadzi =

Congolese Olympic judoka

Personal information
- Full name: Tatiana Martine Bvegadzi
- Nationality: Republic of the Congo
- Born: 30 January 1979 (age 47) Brazzaville, Congo
- Occupation: Judoka
- Height: 1.65 m (5 ft 5 in)
- Weight: 115 kg (254 lb)

Sport
- Sport: Judo
- Event: +78 kg

Profile at external databases
- IJF: 53027
- JudoInside.com: 32692

Tatiana Martine Bvegadzi (born 30 January 1979 in Brazzaville) is a Congolese judoka, who competed in the women's heavyweight category. She picked up a bronze medal in the over-78 kg division at the 2004 African Judo Championships in Tunis, Tunisia, and represented the Republic of the Congo at the 2004 Summer Olympics.

== Career ==
Bvegadzi qualified as a lone judoka for the Congolese squad in the women's heavyweight class (+78 kg) at the 2004 Summer Olympics in Athens, by placing third and receiving a berth from the African Championships in Tunis. She lost her opening match to Cuban judoka and eventual silver medalist Daima Beltrán, who quickly pinned and subdued her on the tatami with an ashi guruma (leg wheel) throw in forty-three seconds.

Bvegadzi gave herself a chance for Congo's first Olympic medal at these Games through the repechage, but came up short in another defeat to Great Britain's Karina Bryant by an ippon and a tsuri goshi (lifting hip throw) nearly two minutes into their first playoff of the draft.
