= Republic of the Congo at the Olympics =

- Flag of the Republic of the Congo
- IOC code: CGO
- NOC: Comité National Olympique et Sportif Congolais
- Medals: Gold 0 Silver 0 Bronze 0 Total 0

Summer appearances
- 1964; 1968; 1972; 1976; 1980; 1984; 1988; 1992; 1996; 2000; 2004; 2008; 2012; 2016; 2020; 2024; 2028

The Republic of the Congo, competing as Congo, first participated at the Olympic Games in 1964, and has sent athletes to compete in most Summer Olympic Games since then. Congo missed the 1968 Games and boycotted the 1976 Games along with most other African nations. The nation has never participated in the Winter Olympic Games.

As of 2016, a total of 74 athletes (45 men and 29 women) have represented Congo at the Olympics. The youngest participant was Alphonse Yanghat, who ran in the 100 m sprint in 1972 at 15 years, 120 days, while the oldest was Gilles Coudray (36 years, 263 days) who competed in the 50 metres freestyle swimming event at the 1992 Barcelona Olympics. No athlete from Congo has ever won an Olympic medal, but Franck Elemba finished fourth in the men's shot put at the 2016 Summer Olympics.

The National Olympic Committee for the Congo was created in 1964 and recognized by the International Olympic Committee that same year.

== Medal tables ==
=== Medals by Summer Games ===
Games	Athletes	Gold	Silver	Bronze	Total	Rank
(Japan) 1964 Tokyo	2	0	0	0	0	–
1968 Mexico City	did not participate					
(West Germany) 1972 Munich	6	0	0	0	0	–
(Canada) 1976 Montreal	boycotted					
(Soviet Union) 1980 Moscow	24	0	0	0	0	–
(United States) 1984 Los Angeles	9	0	0	0	0	–
(South Korea) 1988 Seoul	7	0	0	0	0	–
(Spain) 1992 Barcelona	7	0	0	0	0	–
(United States) 1996 Atlanta	5	0	0	0	0	–
(Australia) 2000 Sydney	5	0	0	0	0	–
(Greece) 2004 Athens	5	0	0	0	0	–
(China) 2008 Beijing	5	0	0	0	0	–
(United Kingdom) 2012 London	7	0	0	0	0	–
(Brazil) 2016 Rio de Janeiro	10	0	0	0	0	–
(Japan) 2020 Tokyo	3	0	0	0	0	–
(France) 2024 Paris	4	0	0	0	0	–
(United States) 2028 Los Angeles	future event					
(Australia) 2032 Brisbane	future event					
Total		0	0	0	0	–

== See also ==
- List of flag bearers for the Congo at the Olympics
- List of participating nations at the Summer Olympic Games
