= Republic of the Congo at the 2020 Summer Olympics =

- Flag of the Republic of the Congo
- IOC code: CGO
- NOC: Comité National Olympique et Sportif Congolais

in Tokyo July 23, 2021 – August 8, 2021
- Competitors: 3 in 2 sports
- Flag bearer (opening): Natacha Ngoye Akamabi
- Flag bearer (closing): Gilles Anthony Afoumba
- Medals: Gold 0 Silver 0 Bronze 0 Total 0

Summer Olympics appearances (overview)
- 1964; 1968; 1972; 1976; 1980; 1984; 1988; 1992; 1996; 2000; 2004; 2008; 2012; 2016; 2020; 2024

Congo, officially Republic of the Congo competed at the 2020 Summer Olympics in Tokyo. Originally scheduled to take place from 24 July to 9 August 2020, the Games were postponed to 23 July to 8 August 2021, due to the COVID-19 pandemic. It was the nations thirteenth appearance at the Summer Olympics, since its debut in 1964. Congolese athletes did not attend the 1968 Summer Olympics in Mexico City, and the 1976 Summer Olympics in Montreal because of the African boycott.

== Competitors ==
The following is the list of number of competitors in the Games.

Sport	Men	Women	Total
Athletics	1	1	2
Swimming	0	1	1
Total	1	2	3

== Athletics ==
Congo received the universality slots from the World Athletics to send two athletes (one male and one female) to the Olympics.

Key

- Note–Ranks given for track events are within the athlete's heat only
- Q = Qualified for the next round
- q = Qualified for the next round as a fastest loser or, in field events, by position without achieving the qualifying target
- NR = National record
- N/A = Round not applicable for the event
- Bye = Athlete not required to compete in round

Track & road events

Athlete	Event	Heat		Quarterfinal		Semifinal		Final	
Athlete	Event	Result	Rank	Result	Rank	Result	Rank	Result	Rank
Gilles Anthony Afoumba	Men's 400 m	46.03 SB	6	—N/a		Did not advance			
Natacha Ngoye Akamabi	Women's 100 m	11.47 SB	1 Q	11.52	6	Did not advance			

== Swimming ==
Congo received a universality invitation from FINA to send a top-ranked female swimmer in her respective individual events to the Olympics, based on the FINA Points System of June 28, 2021.

Athlete	Event	Heat		Semifinal		Final	
Athlete	Event	Time	Rank	Time	Rank	Time	Rank
Stefan Sangala	Women's 50 m freestyle	37.92	81	Did not advance			
