= Republic of the Congo at the 2016 Summer Olympics =

- Flag of the Republic of the Congo
- IOC code: CGO
- NOC: Comité National Olympique et Sportif Congolais

in Rio de Janeiro
- Competitors: 10 in 5 sports
- Flag bearer: Franck Elemba
- Medals: Gold 0 Silver 0 Bronze 0 Total 0

Summer Olympics appearances (overview)
- 1964; 1968; 1972; 1976; 1980; 1984; 1988; 1992; 1996; 2000; 2004; 2008; 2012; 2016; 2020; 2024

Congo, officially Republic of the Congo, competed at the 2016 Summer Olympics in Rio de Janeiro, from August 5 to 21, 2016. This was the nation's twelfth appearance at the Summer Olympics, since its debut in 1964. Congolese athletes did not attend the 1968 Summer Olympics in Mexico City, and the 1976 Summer Olympics in Montreal because of the African boycott.

Congolese Olympics & Sports Committee (French: Comité National Olympique et Sportif Congolais) sent the nation's largest delegation to the Games in a non-boycotting edition. A total of ten athletes, seven men and three women, were selected to the team across five different sports, with two of them returning from London 2012. Table tennis player Suraju Saka, who competed at his third Games, was the oldest (aged 40) and most experienced member of the squad. Meanwhile, shot putter and reigning All-African Games champion Franck Elemba served as the nation's flag bearer in the opening ceremony.

Congo narrowly missed out on its first ever Olympic medal in Rio de Janeiro, as Franck Elemba placed fourth in the men's shot put.

== Athletics (track and field) ==
Congolese athletes have so far achieved qualifying standards in the following athletics events (up to a maximum of 3 athletes in each event):

Key

- Note–Ranks given for track events are within the athlete's heat only
- Q = Qualified for the next round
- q = Qualified for the next round as a fastest loser or, in field events, by position without achieving the qualifying target
- NR = National record
- N/A = Round not applicable for the event
- Bye = Athlete not required to compete in round

Track & road events

Athlete	Event	Heat		Quarterfinal		Semifinal		Final	
Athlete	Event	Result	Rank	Result	Rank	Result	Rank	Result	Rank
Cecilia Bouele	Women's 100 m	11.98	2 Q	12.18	8	Did not advance			

Field events

Athlete	Event	Qualification		Final	
Athlete	Event	Distance	Position	Distance	Position
Franck Elemba	Men's shot put	20.45	11 q	21.20 NR	4

== Boxing ==
Congo entered two boxers to compete in each of the following weight classes into the Olympic competition, signifying the nation's return to the sport for the first time since 1980. Dival Malonga and Anauel Ngamissengue received spare berths freed up by Morocco as the next highest-ranked boxers, not yet qualified, at the 2016 African Qualification Tournament.

Athlete	Event	Round of 32	Round of 16	Quarterfinals	Semifinals	Final	
Athlete	Event	Opposition Result	Opposition Result	Opposition Result	Opposition Result	Opposition Result	Rank
Dival Malonga	Men's light welterweight	Gaibnazarov (UZB); L TKO	Did not advance				
Anauel Ngamissengue	Men's middleweight	Abbadi (ALG); L 0–3	Did not advance				

== Judo ==
Congo qualified one judoka for the men's heavyweight category (+100 kg) at the Games, signifying the nation's Olympic return to the sport for the first time since 2004. Deo Gracia Ngokaba earned a continental quota spot from the African region as Congo's top-ranked judoka outside of direct qualifying position in the IJF World Ranking List of May 30, 2016.

Athlete	Event	Round of 32	Round of 16	Quarterfinals	Semifinals	Repechage	Final / BM	
Athlete	Event	Opposition Result	Opposition Result	Opposition Result	Opposition Result	Opposition Result	Opposition Result	Rank
Deo Gracia Ngokaba	Men's +100 kg	Meyer (NED); L 000–100	Did not advance					

== Swimming ==
Congo received a Universality invitations from FINA to send two swimmers (one male and one female) to the Olympics.

Athlete	Event	Heat		Semifinal		Final	
Athlete	Event	Time	Rank	Time	Rank	Time	Rank
Dienov Andres Koka	Men's 50 m freestyle	28:00	82	Did not advance			
Bellore Sangala	Women's 50 m freestyle	33.71	81	Did not advance			

== Table tennis ==
Congo entered three athletes into the table tennis competition at the Games. Chinese-born players Wang Jianan and Han Xing secured places each in the men's and women's singles by virtue of a top four finish at the 2015 All-Africa Games. They were eventually joined by three-time Olympian Suraju Saka, who finished in the top two at the African Qualification Tournament in Khartoum, Sudan.

Athlete	Event	Preliminary	Round 1	Round 2	Round 3	Round of 16	Quarterfinals	Semifinals	Final / BM	
Athlete	Event	Opposition Result	Opposition Result	Opposition Result	Opposition Result	Opposition Result	Opposition Result	Opposition Result	Opposition Result	Rank
Suraju Saka	Men's singles	Afanador (PUR); L 3–4	Did not advance							
Wang Jianan	Men's singles	K Assar (EGY); W 4–3	Tsuboi (BRA); W 4–0	Karlsson (SWE); L 1–4	Did not advance					
Han Xing	Women's singles	Lariba (PHI); W 4–0	Sawettabut (THA); L 3–4	Did not advance						
