= Republic of the Congo at the 1988 Summer Olympics =

- Flag of the People's Republic of Congo
- IOC code: CGO
- NOC: Comité National Olympique et Sportif Congolais

in Seoul, South Korea September 17–October 2, 1988
- Competitors: 7 in 1 sport
- Flag bearer: Jean-Didiace Bémou
- Medals: Gold 0 Silver 0 Bronze 0 Total 0

Summer Olympics appearances (overview)
- 1964; 1968; 1972; 1976; 1980; 1984; 1988; 1992; 1996; 2000; 2004; 2008; 2012; 2016; 2020; 2024

The People's Republic of the Congo competed at the 1988 Summer Olympics in Seoul, South Korea.

== Competitors ==
The following is the list of number of competitors in the Games.

Sport	Men	Women	Total
Athletics	5	2	7
Total	5	2	7

== Athletics ==
Men
Track and road events

Athlete	Event	Heat Round 1		Heat Round 2		Semifinal		Final	
Athlete	Event	Time	Rank	Time	Rank	Time	Rank	Time	Rank
Henri Ndinga	100 metres	10.74	63	Did not advance					
Henri Ndinga	200 metres	21.66	41	Did not advance					
Jean-Didiace Bémou	400 metres	48.46	54	Did not advance					
Armand Biniakounou (Note: Armand Biniakounou competed in the same discipline in the 1992 Summer Olympics); Hygien-Nicaise Lombocko; Henri Ndinga; Pierre Ndinga	4 × 100 metres relay	41.26	22	—		Did not advance			

Women
Track and road events

Athlete	Event	Heat Round 1		Heat Round 2		Semifinal		Final	
Athlete	Event	Time	Rank	Time	Rank	Time	Rank	Time	Rank
Judith Diankoléla-Missengué	100 metres	12.14	50	Did not advance					
Judith Diankoléla-Missengué	200 metres	25.20	48	Did not advance					
Lasnet Nkouka	400 metres	57.19	42	Did not advance					
