= Republic of the Congo at the 2024 Summer Olympics =

- IOC code: CGO
- NOC: Comité National Olympique et Sportif Congolais

in Paris, France 26 July 2024 – 11 August 2024
- Competitors: 4 (2 men and 2 women) in 3 sports
- Flag bearers (opening): Freddy Mayala & Natacha Ngoye Akamabi
- Flag bearer (closing): Natacha Ngoye Akamabi
- Medals: Gold 0 Silver 0 Bronze 0 Total 0

Summer Olympics appearances (overview)
- 1964; 1968; 1972; 1976; 1980; 1984; 1988; 1992; 1996; 2000; 2004; 2008; 2012; 2016; 2020; 2024

Republic of the Congo competed at the 2024 Summer Olympics in Paris from 26 July to 11 August 2024. Since the nation made its debut in 1964 in Tokyo, Congolese athletes have attended every Summer Games with two exceptions: the 1968 Summer Olympics in Mexico City, and the 1976 Summer Olympics in Montreal, during which Congo led an African boycott.

== Competitors ==
The following is the list of number of competitors in the Games.

Sport	Men	Women	Total
Athletics	0	1	1
Swimming	1	1	2
Table tennis	1	0	1
Total	2	2	4

== Athletics ==
Republic of Congo sent one sprinter to compete at the 2024 Summer Olympics.

Key

- Note–Ranks given for track events are within the athlete's heat only
- Q = Qualified for the next round
- q = Qualified for the next round as a fastest loser or, in field events, by position without achieving the qualifying target
- NR = National record
- N/A = Round not applicable for the event
- Bye = Athlete not required to compete in round

Track events

Athlete	Event	Preliminary		Heat		Semifinal		Final	
Athlete	Event	Result	Rank	Result	Rank	Result	Rank	Result	Rank
Natacha Ngoye Akamabi	Women's 100 m	11.34 Q	1	11.36	6	Did not advance			

== Swimming ==
Republic of the Congo sent two swimmers to compete at the 2024 Paris Olympics.

Athlete	Event	Heat		Semifinal		Final	
Athlete	Event	Time	Rank	Time	Rank	Time	Rank
Freddy Mayala	Men's 50 m freestyle	27.52	65	Did not advance			
Vanessa Bobimbo	Women's 50 m freestyle	33.01	73	Did not advance			

Qualifiers for the latter rounds (Q) of all events were decided on a time only basis, therefore positions shown are overall results versus competitors in all heats.

== Table tennis ==
For the first time since 2016, Republic of the Congo qualified one table tennis athlete. Saheed Idowu received a universality place.

Athlete	Event	Round 1	Round 2	Round of 16	Quarterfinals	Semifinals	Final / BM	
Athlete	Event	Opposition Result	Opposition Result	Opposition Result	Opposition Result	Opposition Result	Opposition Result	Rank
Saheed Idowu	Men's singles	Källberg (SWE); L 3–4	Did not advance					
