= Jessica Malone =

Australian Olympic judoka

Personal information
- Full name: Jessica Malone
- Nationality: Australia
- Born: 27 November 1986 (age 39) Newcastle, New South Wales, Australia
- Height: 1.83 m (6 ft 0 in)
- Weight: 95 kg (209 lb)

Sport
- Sport: Judo
- Event: +78 kg
- Club: Budokan Judo Club

Jessica Malone (born 27 November 1986 in Newcastle, New South Wales) is an Australian judoka, who competed in the women's heavyweight category. She held five Australian titles in her own division, picked up dozens medals in her career, including a single gold in her division from the 2004 Oceania Championships in Nouméa, New Caledonia, and represented her nation Australia, as a 17-year-old teen, at the 2004 Summer Olympics. Malone also trained throughout her sporting career for Budokan Judo Club in Sydney.

Malone qualified for the Australian squad, as a 17-year-old teen, in the women's heavyweight class (+78 kg) at the 2004 Summer Olympics in Athens, by topping the field of judoka and receiving a berth from the Oceania Championships in Nouméa, New Caledonia. Suffering a shoulder injury only 10 days out from competition, she lost her opening match to Japanese judoka and eventual Olympic champion Maki Tsukada, who quickly pinned and subdued her on the tatami with a kosoto gake (small outer hook) at an immediate span of twenty-six seconds. In the repechage, Malone gave herself an Olympic medal chance, but fell short in a fast-pacing, ippon defeat with a similar approach from her previous match to Ukraine's Maryna Prokofyeva six seconds into their bout.

Jessica now coaches a local club in her home town of Newcastle at a local PCYC.
