= Sorel-Arthur Kembe =

Congolese fencer and actor

Personal information
- Nationality: Congolese
- Born: 5 November 1975 (age 50) Budapest, Hungary
- Height: 192 cm (6 ft 4 in)
- Weight: 94 kg (207 lb)
- Children: 1

Sport
- Sport: Fencing

Sorel-Arthur Kembe (born 5 November 1975) is a Hungarian-born Congolese actor and former fencer. He competed in the individual sabre event at the 2004 Summer Olympics.

== Early life ==
Sorel-Arthur Kembe was born on 5 November 1975 in Budapest, Hungary to a Congolese father – who had come to Hungary for studies on printing – and a Hungarian mother from Magyarbánhegyes. In 1987, when he was 12 years old, he started to fence at Budapesti Honvéd SE, coached by István Decsi, a former Hungarian fencing champion, whose son, András Decsi, a former European junior fencing champion, was Sorel-Arthur's fencing partner. From 1987 to 1990, he lived with his mother in Paris, France, in an Arab neighbourhood where fights constantly happened in the playground. Speaking to Békés Megyei Hírlap, Kembe said: "But I have to thank that for teaching me how to fence, because they were always trying to beat me up." His father enrolled him in a fencing school 30 metres (98 ft) away from their apartment due to his hyperactivity. In 1991, Kembe won a bronze medal at the Hungarian National Cadet Fencing Championship, and in 1992, he was a finalist at the World Cadets and Juniors Fencing Championships and also won a gold medal in team competition with György Boros and Andràs Decsi.

== Sports career ==
In 1993, Kembe was called up to the Hungarian team to participate in the World Fencing Championships, but after suffering an injury to his cruciate ligament, his "meteoric rise to prominence took a hit." During this time, due to perestroika and post-USSR changes, his club, Budapesti Honvéd SE, dissolved. After high school, Kembe stopped training but started to train again after deciding to compete at the Olympic Games, explaining to Békés Megyei Hírlap that his decision came after he saw a swimmer nearly drown at the 2000 Summer Olympics in Sydney, Australia. He stated: "I thought that if that guy could be there, somehow I could also make it to the next Olympic Games in Athens." However, due to a 10-year hiatus, he stated that he would not have had a chance at joining the Hungarian fencing team. In 2003, he founded the Congolese Fencing Federation, made it internationally recognized, integrated it into the Congolese National Olympic and Sports Committee before having it join the International Olympic Committee, in addition to it becoming a full member of the International Fencing Federation, allowing him to compete under the Congolese flag.

== Personal life ==
Kembe lives in Budapest, Hungary. He has a daughter. He often visits Békés County where his maternal grandparents and cousin live.
