= Henri Elendé =

Congolese high jumper (1941–2022)

- Elendé c. 2022

Personal information
- Born: 13 November 1941 Brazzaville, French Congo
- Died: 23 June 2022 (aged 80) Brazzaville, Republic of the Congo
- Height: 1.77 m (5 ft 10 in)

Sport
- Sport: Athletics
- Event: High jump

Achievements and titles
- Personal best: 2.14 m NR
Medal record
Men's athletics
Representing the Republic of the Congo
All-Africa Games
Silver medal – second place	1965 Brazzaville	High jump

Henri Elendé (13 November 1941 – 23 June 2022) was a Congolese high jumper. Growing up, Elendé had started practicing sports in school. Later on, he won two gold medals in the high jump at two editions of the Friendship Games. He had also set a national record in 1965 at a height of 2.14 metres and has stood ever since as of 2022. Alongside Léon Yombe, he would be part of the first Olympic team to represent the Republic of the Congo.

At the qualification round for the men's high jump, he had placed first, though in the finals he placed last. After the games, he won a silver medal in the high jump at the inaugural All-Africa Games. He then moved to Paris to study; while studying he became a two-time French university champion in the high jump. He returned to Congo in 1970 and held numerous directorial positions such as High Commissioner for Youth and Sports.

Through his service in sport, he was named as the Congolese athlete of the century in 2000, was awarded the National Order of Sports Merit by the president at the time, and had a gymnasium named after him.

== Biography ==
Henri Elendé was born on 13 November 1941 in Brazzaville, Republic of Congo. While studying at school, Elendé also trained in athletics. He won the gold medals in the high jump at the inaugural Friendship Games in Abidjan and the second edition in 1963 in Dakar.

In Châtellerault on 6 September 1965, Elendé had set a national record in the men's high jump at a height of 2.14 metres. As of 2022, this record has not been broken though it has been equaled in 1997 by Jean-Claude Silao. Alongside Léon Yombe, they would compete at the 1964 Summer Olympics as the first team representing the Republic of the Congo at an Olympic Games.

At the qualification round for the men's high jump on 20 October, Elendé had ranked first with a height of 2.06 metres, qualifying for the finals. At the finals the following day, he placed last out of a field of 20 competitors, only clearing 1.90 metres. After the games, he competed at the 1965 All-Africa Games in Brazzaville as one of the most anticipated athletes to compete and was also designated as the flagbearer for the nation at the opening ceremony. He won the silver medal in the men's high jump with a height of 2.03 metres.

After the All-Africa Games, he moved to Paris to study at the National Institute of Sport, Expertise, and Performance and later the Higher Institute of Physical Education and Sports. While studying, he became the 1965 and 1966 French university champion. Due to his results, he trained alongside the French national team.

Upon graduating in 1970, he returned to Congo and had directorial roles in sports, such as becoming the High Commissioner for Youth and Sports. Later on, he was named as the Congolese athlete of the century in 2000 and was awarded the National Order of Sports Merit by president Denis Sassou Nguesso. A gymnasium near the Stade Alphonse Massemba-Débat was also named after him. He later died on 23 June 2022 at the age of 80 in Brazzaville.
