= Eleni Patsiou =

Greek judoka

Eleni Patsiou (Greek: Ελένη Πάτσιου; born 5 September 1971) is a former Greek judoka, Balkan Judo Championship Gold medalist, and Greek champion.

In 2004, a few days before the 2004 Summer Olympics, she was called to replace the severe injured, and later deceased, Eleni Ioannou. She competed in the heavyweight class, but was knocked out in the first round by French Eva Bisseni.

In 2007 she won the gold medal at the category of +78kg, at the Balkan Judo Championship, hosted in Nea Ionia, Greece.

In 2013, the Hellenic Judo Federation announced that Patsiou was the second most prominent Greek female judoka, (following Alexia Kourtelesi), having won an overall number of 19 medals (6 gold, 10 silver and 3 bronze medals) in the Greek Judo Championships.

She has also won a silver medal at an international tournament and 1 gold and 1 silver at female junior Greek Championships.
