= Marien Michel Ngouabi =

Congolese former swimmer (born 1980)

Personal information
- Full name: Marien Michel Ngouabi
- National team: Republic of the Congo
- Born: 3 June 1980 (age 46) Havana, Cuba
- Height: 1.72 m (5 ft 8 in)

Sport
- Sport: Swimming
- Strokes: Freestyle

Marien Michel Ngouabi (born 3 June 1980) is a Congolese former swimmer, who specialized in sprint freestyle events. Ngouabi represented the Republic of the Congo at the 2000 Summer Olympics, where he became the nation's flag bearer in the opening ceremony. He is also the grandson of Marien Ngouabi, the former president of the Republic of the Congo.

Ngouabi competed only in the men's 100 m freestyle at the 2000 Summer Olympics in Sydney. He received a Universality place from FINA, in an entry time of 59.50. He challenged six other swimmers in heat two, including 15-year-olds Ragi Edde of Lebanon and Dawood Youssef of Bahrain. He pulled himself farther from the top field to a sixth seed in 1:00.39, almost a full second below his entry standard and 6.84 seconds behind leader Gregory Arkhurst of Côte d'Ivoire. Ngouabi failed to advance into the semifinals, as he placed sixty-eighth overall in the prelims.

Ngouabi operates a wood processing and furniture manufacturing business named Rosewood in Brazzaville.

Olympic Games
Preceded by Léontine Tsiba	Flagbearer for Congo; Sydney 2000	Succeeded by Rony Bakale
