= Léon Yombe =

Congolese sprinter

Personal information
- Nationality: Congolese
- Born: 7 April 1944 (age 82)

Sport
- Sport: Sprinting
- Event: 100 metres

Léon Yombe (born 7 April 1944) is a Congolese sprinter. He competed in the men's 100 metres at the 1964 Summer Olympics. With Henri Elende, Yombe made up the first team from the Republic of the Congo to participate in the Olympic Games.
