= Barbara Andolina =

Italian judoka

Personal information
- Born: 16 October 1978 (age 48)
Medal record
Women's judo
Representing Italy
European Championships
Bronze medal – third place	2002 Maribor	+78 kg
Bronze medal – third place	2002 Maribor	Open class

Barbara Andolina (born 16 October 1978) is an Italian judoka.

== Achievements ==
Year	Tournament	Place	Weight Class
2002	European Championships	3rd	Heavyweight (+78 kg)
2002	European Championships	3rd	Open class
2003	World Championships	7th	Heavyweight (+78 kg)
2004	European Open Championships	5th	Heavyweight (+78 kg)
2005	Mediterranean Games	3rd	Heavyweight (+78 kg)
