= Pamela Mouele-Mboussi =

Congolese long and triple jumper (born 1988)

Personal information
- Full name: Pamela Chardene Mouele-Mboussi
- Nationality: Congolese
- Born: 7 May 1988 (age 38) Brazzaville, Congo
- Height: 1.70 m (5 ft 7 in)

Sport
- Country: Republic of the Congo
- Sport: Athletics
- Event: Long jump

Achievements and titles
- Personal best(s): Long jump: 6.06 m (2008); Triple jump: 11.87 m (2007)

Pamela Chardene Mouele-Mboussi (born May 7, 1988, in Brazzaville) is a Congolese long and triple jumper. Mouele-Mboussi represented the Republic of the Congo at the 2008 Summer Olympics in Beijing, where she carried the nation's flag for her team during the opening ceremony. Mouele-Mboussi competed for the women's long jump, where she placed thirty-fifth overall in the qualifying rounds, with a national record-breaking jump of 6.06 metres.

Mouele-Mboussi also set a personal best of 11.87 m for the triple jump at the 2007 All-Africa Games in Algiers, Algeria.

Olympic Games
Preceded by Rony Bakale	Flagbearer for Congo; Beijing 2008	Succeeded by Lorène Bazolo
