= Lorène Bazolo =

Portuguese sprinter (born 1983)

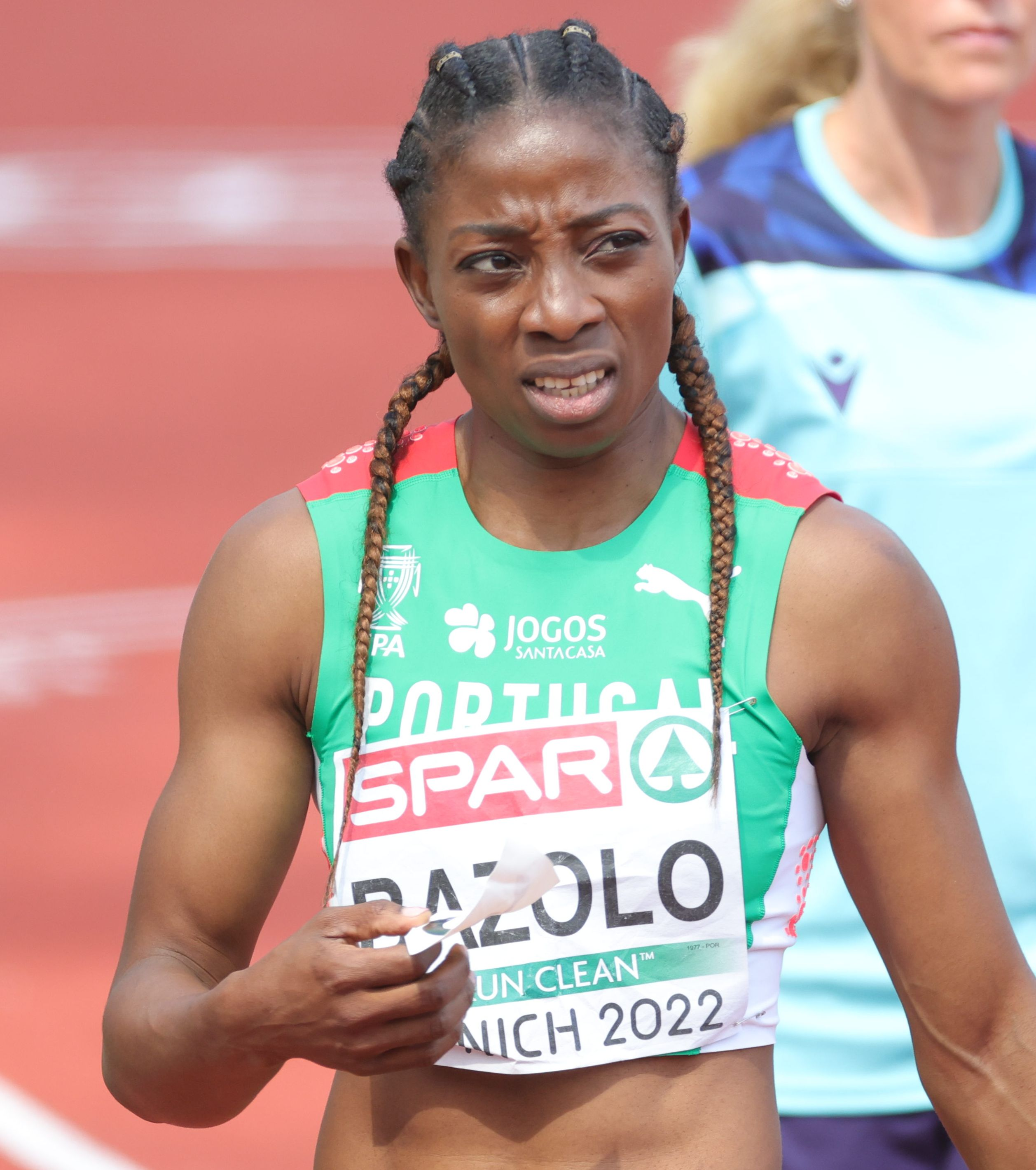
- Bazolo at the 2022 European Athletics Championships

Personal information
- Born: 4 May 1983 (age 42) Brazzaville, Republic of the Congo
- Height: 1.70 m (5 ft 7 in)
- Weight: 60 kg (132 lb)

Sport
- Country: Portugal
- Sport: Athletics
- Event(s): 100 m, 200 m

Lorène Dorcas Bazolo (born 4 May 1983) is a track and field athlete. Born in the Republic of the Congo, she currently represents Portugal internationally but competed for her country of birth in the past. She is the Congolese national record holder in the 100 metres, with a time of 11.39 seconds. She was the Congolese flag bearer at the 2012 Summer Olympics.

== Career ==
She competed at the African Championships in Athletics in 2008, 2010 and 2012 and represented Congo in both the 100 m at the 200 metres at the 2011 All-Africa Games. She has also represented her nation at the Summer Universiade (2009 and 2011) and the 2009 Jeux de la Francophonie.

During 2013 she arrived in Portugal on political asylum and soon joined athletics clubs JOMA, and later, Sporting Club de Portugal. After acquiring Portuguese citizenship during 2016 she has beaten the national 100 m record, which is now set at 11.21 seconds.

During the 2020 Summer Olympics, Lorène reached the 200 m semifinals with 23.20 seconds. On 14 August 2021, at the Résisprint La Chaux-de-Fonds Meeting, Switzerland, Bazolo beat her 100 m and the 25 year old 200 m national records which now stand at 11.10 and 22.64 seconds, respectively.

Competing for Portugal over 200 metres at the 2024 European Championships in Rome, Italy in June 2024, she qualified for the semi-finals with a run of 23.18 seconds, but did not progress further into the final. She was also a semi-finalist at the 2025 European Athletics Indoor Championships in Apeldoorn, over 60 metres.

Olympic Games
Preceded by Pamela Mouele-Mboussi	Flagbearer for Congo; London 2012	Succeeded by Franck Elemba
