= Alphonse Yanghat =

Congolese sprint athlete

Personal information
- Born: 4 May 1957 Bétou, Republic of Congo
- Died: 18 April 2018 (aged 60) Pointe-Noire, Republic of Congo

Sport
- Sport: Track and field

Alphonse Yanghat (4 May 1957 – 18 April 2018) was a track and field sprinter from the Republic of the Congo. He set a personal best of 10.4 seconds for the 100 metres in 1972 and gained selection to compete at the 1972 Munich Olympics.

At the Olympics he finished seventh in his heat (second last ahead of Liberia's Andrew Sartee). Having represented his country at the age of fifteen, he became the youngest ever Olympic competitor for the Republic of Congo. He is also the youngest runner ever to compete in the men's 100 metres at the Olympics.
