= George Miyasaki =

American painter (1935–2013)

Green Landscape by George Miyasaki, 1957, oil on canvas, Honolulu Museum of Art

Red 48 by George Miyasaki, 1963

George Joji Miyasaki (1935–2013), was an American painter and printmaker, active in the abstract expressionist movement.

== Early life and education ==
George Joji Miyasaki was born in 1935 in Kalopa, Hawaii, and spent part of his childhood in a Japanese internment camp. He moved to California in 1953.

He received a B.F.A. degree and a B.A.Ed. degree from the California College of the Arts in 1957, and an M.F.A. degree from the same institution in 1958, studying under Richard Diebenkorn and Nathan Oliveira.

== Career ==
After teaching at the California College of the Arts, and Stanford University, he was appointed a full professor at the University of California, Berkeley in 1964. By 1958, he was experimenting with methods and materials, producing what appeared to be the first color lithographs by a West Coast Abstract Expressionist that were widely shown. They were included in 13 exhibitions in 1958 alone. In 1960, Willem de Kooning visited Miyasaki's studio to try his hand at lithography. De Kooning, with the help of Miyasaki and Nathan Oliveira, created at least two abstract lithographs.

Miyasaki's paintings and lithographs from the 1950s, such as Green Landscape, in the collection of the Honolulu Museum of Art, are typical of abstract expressionism. In the 1960s, his work began to incorporate well defined forms, an example of which is Red Eye from 1963. "Miyasaki's paintings radiate an expressionistic intensity derived not from the discordant drips and splashes of the spontaneous Ab Ex encounter, but from a meticulous compositional strategy that uses subtle juxtapositions of color and line to achieve an overall sense of resolution and harmony." In his later Magnolia Editions collagraphs, the "muscular and delicate elements" showed that the West Coast strain of Abstract Expressionism to be every bit as vital and impressive as its New York counterpart," according to Bay Area writer Nick Stone.

His work is included in the collections of The Art Institute of Chicago, the British Museum (London), the Brooklyn Museum, the Honolulu Museum of Art the Metropolitan Museum of Art, the Museum of Fine Arts, Boston, the Museum of Modern Art (New York City), the National Gallery of Art (Washington, D.C), the Philadelphia Museum of Art, the San Francisco Museum of Modern Art, and the Whitney Museum of American Art (New York City).
