= Emile Bakale =

Swimmer from Republic of the Congo

Emile-Rony Bakale
Personal information
- Full name: Emile Rony Bakale
- Nationality: Congo
- Born: October 6, 1987 (age 38) Timișoara Romania
- Height: 1 m (3 ft 3 in) 88
- Weight: 85 kg (187 lb)

Sport
- Sport: Swimming
- Strokes: Backstroke
- Club: TuksSwimming (South Africa)

Emile-Rony Bakale (born 6 October 1987 in Timișoara) is a Romanian-born Republic of the Congo swimmer specializing in freestyle. He swam for the Congo at the 2004, 2008 and 2012 Olympics. He was the Congo's flagbearer in 2004.

He also swam at almost all the World Swimming Championships between 2000 and 2015 and the All-Africa Games between 1999 and 2015. Bakale is an engineer in Robotics. His elder sister Monika also swam for the Congo.

Olympic Games
Preceded by Marien Michel Ngouabi	Flagbearer for Congo; Athens 2004	Succeeded by Pamela Mouele-Mboussi
