= Daima Beltrán =

Cuban judoka (born 1972)

Personal information
- Full name: Daima Mayelis Beltrán Guisado
- Born: 10 September 1972 (age 54)
- Occupation: Judoka

Sport
- Country: Cuba
- Sport: Judo
- Weight class: +78 kg

Achievements and titles
- Olympic Games: (silver) (2000, 2004)
- World Champ.: (gold) (1997, 1999)
- Pan American Champ.: (gold) (× 8 times)
Medal record
Women's judo
Representing Cuba
Olympic Games
Silver medal – second place	2000 Sydney	+78 kg
Silver medal – second place	2004 Athens	+78 kg
World Championships
Gold medal – first place	1997 Paris	Open
Gold medal – first place	1999 Birmingham	Open
Bronze medal – third place	1995 Chiba	+72 kg
Bronze medal – third place	2001 Munich	+78 kg
Bronze medal – third place	2003 Osaka	Open
Pan American Games
Gold medal – first place	1995 Mara del Plata	+72 kg
Gold medal – first place	1999 Winnipeg	+78 kg
Gold medal – first place	2003 Santo Domingo	+78 kg
Pan American Championships
Gold medal – first place	1994 Santiago	+72 kg
Gold medal – first place	1996 San Juan	+72 kg
Gold medal – first place	1997 Guadalajara	+72 kg
Gold medal – first place	1998 Santo Domingo	+78 kg
Gold medal – first place	2001 Cordoba	+78 kg
Gold medal – first place	2001 Cordoba	Open
Gold medal – first place	2002 Santo Domingo	+78 kg
Gold medal – first place	2002 Santo Domingo	Open
World Juniors Championships
Gold medal – first place	1990 Dijon	+72 kg
Summer Universiade
Gold medal – first place	1995 Fukuoka	+72 kg
Bronze medal – third place	1999 Palma de Mallorca	+78 kg
Bronze medal – third place	1999 Palma de Mallorca	Open

Profile at external databases
- IJF: 7751
- JudoInside.com: 956
- Updated on 31 May 2023

Daima Mayelis Beltrán Guisado (born 10 September 1972) is a Cuban judoka. At the 2000 Summer Olympics she won the silver medal in the women's Heavyweight (+78 kg) category. She repeated that feat four years later in Athens, Greece.

Beltrán is currently training the Mexican Judo women's team at the CONADE facilities. Her most outstanding judokas to date have been Vanessa Zamboti and Edna Carrillo, who have participated in some editions of the Olympic Games.
