= Freddy Mayala =

Congolese swimmer

Personal information
- Born: June 18, 2000 (age 26)

Sport
- Sport: Swimming

Freddy Mayala (born 18 June 2000) is a Congolese swimmer. He competed in the men's 50 metre freestyle event at the 2024 Summer Olympics, but did not advance past the heats.
