= Jean-Didiace Bémou =

Congolese sprinter

Jean-Didace Bemou
Personal information
- Nationality: Congolese
- Born: 7 April 1959 (age 67)

Sport
- Sport: Sprinting
- Event: 400 metres

Jean-Didace Bémou (born 7 April 1959) is a Congolese sprinter. He competed in the 400 metres at the 1984 Summer Olympics and the 1988 Summer Olympics. After his athletic career, he became a singer.
