= Congolese Amateur Swimming Federation =

CANA
- Founded: 1970
- FINA affiliation: 1976
- CANA affiliation: xxxx
- Website: www.feconat.org
- President: Rachel Dominique Ngouabi

The Congolese Amateur Swimming Federation (French: Fédération Congolaise de Natation Amateur), is the national governing body for the sport of swimming in the Republic of the Congo.
