= Congolese National Olympic and Sports Committee =

National Olympic Committee

- Country: Republic of the Congo
- Code: CGO
- Created: 1964
- Recognized: 1964
- Continental Association: ANOCA
- President: Raymond Ibata
- Secretary General: Jean-Paul Ngaloua
- Website: www.cnosc.net

The Congolese National Olympic and Sports Committee (French: Comité National Olympique et Sportif Congolais) (IOC code: CGO) is the National Olympic Committee representing the Republic of the Congo. It was formed in 1964 and was recognised by the International Olympic Committee on 27 January 1964, at the IOC Session in Innsbruck.
