= Flag of the Republic of the Congo =

Republic of the Congo
- Use: National flag and ensign
- Proportion: 2:3
- Adopted: September 15, 1959; 67 years ago (Re-adopted on 10 June 1991)
- Design: A diagonal tricolour of green, yellow and red radiating from the lower hoist side corner

The national flag of the Republic of the Congo (French: drapeau de la république du Congo) consists of a yellow diagonal band divided diagonally from the lower hoist-side corner, with a green upper triangle and red lower triangle. Adopted in 1959 to replace the French Tricolour, it was the flag of the Republic of the Congo until 1970, when the People's Republic of the Congo was established. The new regime changed the flag to a red field with the emblem of the People's Republic in the canton. This version was utilized until the regime collapsed in 1991. The new government promptly restored the original pre-1970 flag.

== History ==
Under French colonial rule over French Congo, the authorities forbade the colony from utilizing its own distinctive colonial flag. This was because they were worried that this could increase nationalistic sentiment and lead to calls for independence. However, with the rise of the decolonization movement in Africa, the French were obliged to grant limited autonomy to the Congo as a self-governing republic within the French Community. This was granted on 28 November 1958, after a referendum was held and nine months later, the Legislative Assembly began deliberating over a national flag.

The new flag was officially adopted on 15 September 1959 and remained unchanged when the French Congo became an independent state less than a year later on 15 August 1960. It was hoisted on top of the building that formerly housed the French high commission to mark the proclamation of independence. In 1968, a coup d'état took place in the country, with the new government proclaiming the People's Republic of the Congo a year later. By doing so, it became the first Marxist–Leninist country in Africa. In order to symbolize the revolutionary change, the regime instituted a new national anthem and chose a new flag. This featured a red field charged with the country's new coat of arms—a gold star with an overlapping hammer and hoe encircled by a wreath made of two palm branches—in the top-left canton. The design was inspired by that of the Soviet Union's flag.

The red flag remained in place until 1991, when economic problems and the weakening of the Soviet Union's power due to the Revolutions of 1989 culminated in democratic elections and ultimately, the collapse of the People's Republic of the Congo. The National Conference, which oversaw the transition to a democratic government, reinstated the original flag from 1959 on 10 June 1991. The colours and shapes on the flag are mentioned in Article 5 of the constitution of the Republic of the Congo.

Flag of the Kingdom of Loango (c. 1550–c. 1883)

Flag of the Kingdom of Kongo (circa 17th century)

Flag of Kakongo (circa 15th century)

Proposed flag of the French Congo (pre-1959)

Flag of the People's Republic of the Congo (2 January 1970 – 9 June 1991) and the Congolese Party of Labour

== Design ==
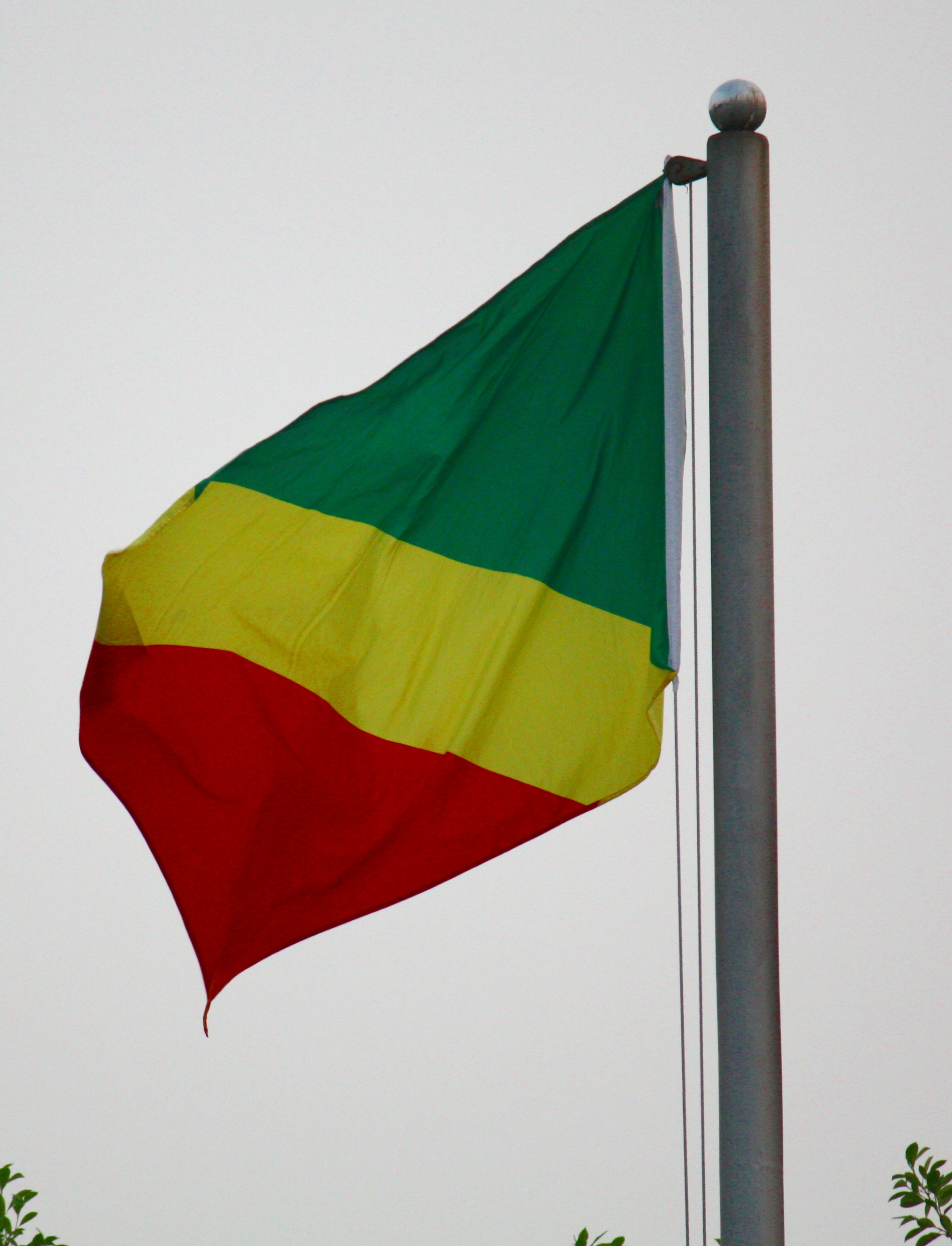
Republic of the Congo flag

The colours of the flag carry cultural, political, and regional meanings. The green symbolizes the agriculture and forests of the Congo, while the yellow represents the "friendship and nobility" of the Congolese people. However, the symbolism behind the red was left unexplained. From a continental viewpoint, the green, yellow and red are the colours of the Pan-Africanist movement; it is the only Pan-Africanist flag to utilize a diagonal pattern in its design. They are also 3 of the colors utilized in the flag of Ethiopia, the oldest independent country in Africa and the only nation other than Liberia to remain independent during the Scramble for Africa.

=== Colour schemes ===
(1991–present)	Green	Yellow	Red
Pantone	355 C	109 C	032 C
RGB ^{a}	0, 151, 57	255, 209, 0	239, 51, 64
CMYK ^{b}	100-0-62-41	0-18-100-0	0-84-86-14
Hexadecimal ^{b}	#009739	#FFD100	#EF3340

^a Converted from Pantone color model per connect.pantone.com
^b Converted from RGB based on Inkscape colours value

== Similar Flags ==
- Flag of Saint Kitts and Nevis
