= Handball in Serbia =

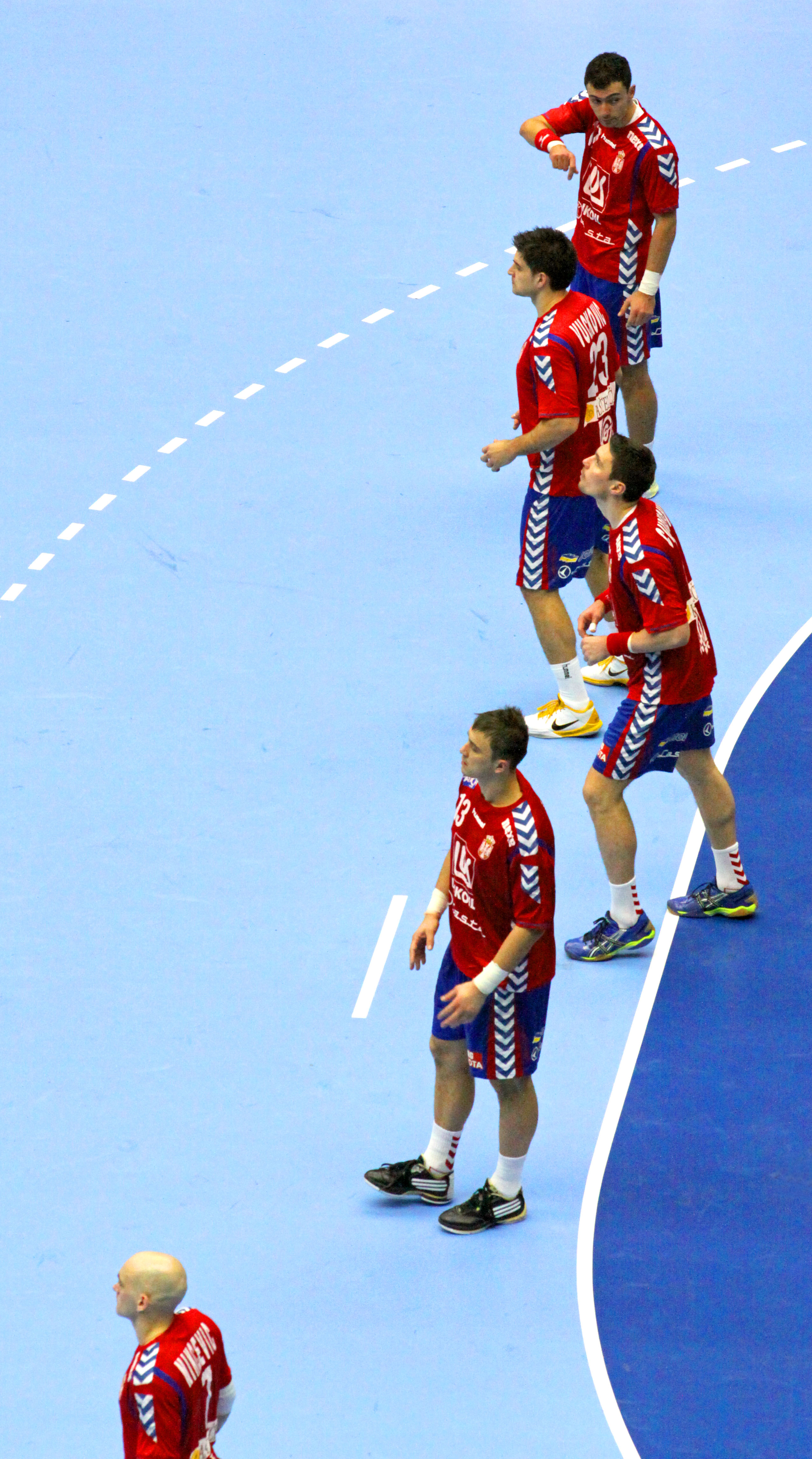
Serbian national handball team

Handball in Serbia was first played during the Interwar period. Originally, it was played in the form of Czech handball and field handball, forerunners to the modern sport of handball. From 1958, modern handball took primacy over other forms of the game. In November 1948 the first Belgrade handball championship took place.

The Handball Federation of Yugoslavia was formed in 1949. From 1953, the Yugoslav championship for men and women began. From 1955, the Yugoslavia national cup began.

== History of handball ==
History of handball in Serbia has not been sufficiently researched. There are data from official publications, as well as data from some other publications, whose authors are predominantly from the western parts of the former Yugoslavia. There are encountered in the data that suggest that the handball was played in Serbia after World War II. According to these data, the initiative for the development of handball in Serbia, was transcribed to instructors from Board for Handball Gymnastics Association of Croatia. In Youth Work Actions (Samac - Sarajevo 1947. year) instructors were running a school for "training" fitness instructors, including instructor for a handball game. In each of the 10 sections along the vast construction site was one handball instructor. In the year of 1948. during the work on the youth line Kučevo - Bodrica, was formed handball company, within the sports brigade, whose manager was Vojislav Vojnovic. With participation in the company of handball, instructors were got the "legitimacy" to after return in their own community, they were now able to work on establishing the handball section at their local gyms and gymnastic societies. Later these instructors are throughout Serbia, were founded the first handball clubs and teams in the country.

The credit for the development of sport in Serbia, Yugoslavia, later, to a certain degree belong to students who have gained their knowledge abroad. They are after arrival in their homeland, brought with them foreign local culture, features, and sports. Czech handball than later field handball was found its way in Serbia over Slovenia, Croatia and Hungary. Sports were continues to spread across the school organization, school physical education and other ways.

== See also ==
- Handball League of Serbia
