= Modern pentathlon at the 1988 Summer Olympics – Men's individual =

Men's individual modern pentathlon at the Games of the XXIV Olympiad
- Dates: September 18–22
- Competitors: 65 from 26 nations

Medalists
1st place, gold medalist(s)		János Martinek	Hungary
2nd place, silver medalist(s)		Carlo Massullo	Italy
3rd place, bronze medalist(s)		Vakhtang Iagorashvili	Soviet Union

The modern pentathlon at the 1988 Summer Olympics was represented by two events (both for men): Individual competition and Team competition. It was fought in five days on September 18 to 22, and individual results were also directly applied towards the team event ranking.

== Results ==
Rank	Pentathlete	Nation	Rid.	Fen.	Swi.	Sho.	Run.	Score
1st place, gold medalist(s)	János Martinek	HUN	1066	990	1264	868	1216	5404
2nd place, silver medalist(s)	Carlo Massullo	ITA	1010	881	1204	1044	1240	5379
3rd place, bronze medalist(s)	Vakhtang Iagorashvili	URS	980	915	1344	978	1150	5367
4	Attila Mizsér	HUN	1010	847	1196	934	1294	5281
5	Christophe Ruer	FRA	968	779	1348	934	1213	5242
6	Richard Phelps	GBR	964	898	1304	868	1195	5229
7	László Fábián	HUN	876	1051	1304	802	1168	5201
8	Joel Bouzou	FRA	1004	983	1172	868	1171	5198
9	Peter Steinmann	SUI	920	983	1252	780	1246	5181
10	Daniele Masala	ITA	948	837	1232	1066	1069	5152
11	Milan Kadlec	TCH	1064	905	1092	802	1267	5130
12	Kim Myung-Gon	KOR	1040	762	1252	1066	979	5099
13	Kang Kyung-Hyo	KOR	1070	830	1264	868	1042	5074
14	Ivar Sisniega	MEX	950	752	1260	890	1213	5065
15	Maciej Czyzowicz	POL	770	847	1308	1000	1123	5048
16	Dominic Mahony	GBR	1036	898	1148	890	1075	5047
17	Gianluca Tiberti	ITA	1040	674	1296	1000	1030	5040
18	Robert Nieman	USA	944	932	1248	1000	910	5034
19	Tomas Fleissner	TCH	1006	762	1172	1022	1048	5010
20	Guerman Iouferov	URS	716	949	1324	934	1084	5007
21	Graham Brookhouse	GBR	986	643	1312	846	1213	5000
22	Svante Rasmuson	SWE	916	830	1232	934	1075	4987
23	Arkadiusz Skrzypaszek	POL	1040	660	1312	934	1036	4982
24	Marcus Marsollek	FRG	858	847	1140	1044	1075	4964
25	Jan-Erik Danielsson	SWE	890	864	1140	1044	1018	4956
26	Andy Jung	SUI	974	864	1192	912	1009	4951
27	Tue Hellstem	DEN	1060	745	1152	890	1093	4940
28	Alejandro Yrizar	MEX	854	847	1248	890	1081	4920
29	Jiri Prokopius	TCH	980	694	1244	934	1051	4903
30	Hiroshi Saito	JPN	1096	718	976	956	1135	4881
31	Mohamed Abouelsouad	EGY	1100	694	1072	1044	943	4853
32	Eduardo Quesada	ESP	1010	762	1256	626	1198	4852
33	Lawrence Keyte	CAN	1032	609	1092	934	1180	4847
34	Manuel Barroso	POR	910	677	1236	802	1219	4844
35	Anatoli Avdeev	URS	680	871	1324	890	1075	4840
36	Helmut Spannagl	AUT	1024	796	1160	868	985	4833
37	Bruno Genard	FRA	912	711	1260	912	1033	4828
38	Leopoldo Centeno	ESP	797	643	1256	956	1162	4814
39	Marcelo Hoyo	MEX	926	762	1140	780	1192	4800
40	Nicholas Fekete	CAN	1024	711	1160	956	934	4785
41	Michael Zimmermann	FRG	950	813	1240	824	955	4782
42	Dirk Knappheide	FRG	1034	677	1272	934	848	4765
43	Peter Burger	SUI	938	694	1172	780	1147	4731
44	Li King-Ho	TPE	1068	728	1092	890	904	4682
45	Barry Kennedy	CAN	770	728	1128	1000	1051	4677
46	Ayman Mahmoud	EGY	946	609	1176	890	1054	4675
47	Ahmed Al Doseri	BRN	816	735	1020	890	1180	4641
48	Saleh Farhan	BRN	824	847	1112	736	1081	4600
49	Robert Stull	USA	470	983	1240	868	1027	4588
50	Mostafa Adam	EGY	1012	728	1140	912	793	4585
51	Tadafumi Miwa	JPN	962	582	1080	956	937	4517
52	Abdul Rahman Khalid	BRN	628	650	1088	1088	1048	4502
53	Wieslaw Chmielewski	POL	576	847	1224	758	1096	4501
54	Chuang Tang-Fa	TPE	920	694	1100	868	853	4435
55	Julio Fuentes	CHI	782	548	1156	956	883	4325
56	Ricardo Falconi	CHI	980	575	1112	736	913	4316
57	Roderick Martin	SWE	0	915	1276	1044	1027	4262
58	Gerardo Cortes	CHI	950	762	1104	406	934	4156
59	Zhang Bin	CHN	706	762	1080	890	643	4081
60	Michael Gostigan	USA	0	820	1264	1044	895	4023
61	Kim Sung-Ho	KOR	0	609	1248	1000	997	3854
62	Alejandro Michelena	URU	912	429	812	934	703	3790
63	Hiroaki Izumikawa	JPN	0	694	1008	846	1174	3722
DSQ	Alexander Watson	AUS						
DSQ	Jorge Quesada	ESP						
