= Modern pentathlon at the 1988 Summer Olympics – Men's team =

Men's team modern pentathlon at the Games of the XXIV Olympiad
- Dates: September 18–22
- Competitors: 57 from 19 nations

Medalists
| 1st place, gold medalist(s) | | László Fábián; János Martinek; Attila Mizsér | Hungary |
| 2nd place, silver medalist(s) | | Daniele Masala; Carlo Massullo; Gianluca Tiberti | Italy |
| 3rd place, bronze medalist(s) | | Graham Brookhouse; Dominic Mahony; Richard Phelps | Great Britain |

The modern pentathlon at the 1988 Summer Olympics was represented by two events (both for men): Individual competition and Team competition. It was fought in five days on September 18 to 22, and individual results were also directly applied towards the team event ranking.

== Results ==
| Pos | Nation | Athlete(s) | Rid. | Fen. | Sho. | Swi. | Run. | Score | Team Score |
| 1st place, gold medalist(s) | Hungary | János Martinek | 1066 | 990 | 1264 | 868 | 1216 | 5404 | 15886 |
| 1st place, gold medalist(s) | Hungary | Attila Mizsér | 1010 | 847 | 1196 | 934 | 1294 | 5281 | 15886 |
| 1st place, gold medalist(s) | Hungary | László Fábián | 876 | 1051 | 1304 | 802 | 1168 | 5201 | 15886 |
| 2nd place, silver medalist(s) | Italy | Carlo Massullo | 1010 | 881 | 1204 | 1044 | 1240 | 5379 | 15571 |
| 2nd place, silver medalist(s) | Italy | Daniele Masala | 948 | 837 | 1232 | 1066 | 1069 | 5152 | 15571 |
| 2nd place, silver medalist(s) | Italy | Gianluca Tiberti | 1040 | 674 | 1296 | 1000 | 1030 | 5040 | 15571 |
| 3rd place, bronze medalist(s) | Great Britain | Richard Phelps | 964 | 898 | 1304 | 868 | 1195 | 5229 | 15276 |
| 3rd place, bronze medalist(s) | Great Britain | Dominic Mahony | 1036 | 898 | 1148 | 890 | 1075 | 5047 | 15276 |
| 3rd place, bronze medalist(s) | Great Britain | Graham Brookhouse | 986 | 643 | 1312 | 846 | 1213 | 5000 | 15276 |
| 4 | France | Christophe Ruer | 968 | 779 | 1348 | 934 | 1213 | 5242 | 15268 |
| 4 | France | Joel Bouzou | 1004 | 983 | 1172 | 868 | 1171 | 5198 | 15268 |
| 4 | France | Bruno Genard | 912 | 711 | 1260 | 912 | 1033 | 4828 | 15268 |
| 5 | Soviet Union | Vakhtang Iagorashvili | 980 | 915 | 1344 | 978 | 1150 | 5367 | 15214 |
| 5 | Soviet Union | Guerman Iouferov | 716 | 949 | 1324 | 934 | 1084 | 5007 | 15214 |
| 5 | Soviet Union | Anatoli Avdeev | 680 | 871 | 1324 | 890 | 1075 | 4840 | 15214 |
| 6 | Czechoslovakia | Milan Kadlec | 1064 | 905 | 1092 | 802 | 1267 | 5130 | 15043 |
| 6 | Czechoslovakia | Tomas Fleissner | 1006 | 762 | 1172 | 1022 | 1048 | 5010 | 15043 |
| 6 | Czechoslovakia | Jiri Prokopius | 980 | 694 | 1244 | 934 | 1051 | 4903 | 15043 |
| 7 | Switzerland | Peter Steinmann | 920 | 983 | 1252 | 780 | 1246 | 5181 | 14863 |
| 7 | Switzerland | Andy Jung | 974 | 864 | 1192 | 912 | 1009 | 4951 | 14863 |
| 7 | Switzerland | Peter Burger | 938 | 694 | 1172 | 780 | 1147 | 4731 | 14863 |
| 8 | Mexico | Ivar Sisniega | 950 | 752 | 1260 | 890 | 1213 | 5065 | 14785 |
| 8 | Mexico | Alejandro Yrizar | 854 | 847 | 1248 | 890 | 1081 | 4920 | 14785 |
| 8 | Mexico | Marcelo Hoyo | 926 | 762 | 1140 | 780 | 1192 | 4800 | 14785 |
| 9 | Poland | Maciej Czyzowicz | 770 | 847 | 1308 | 1000 | 1123 | 5048 | 14531 |
| 9 | Poland | Arkadiusz Skrzypaszek | 1040 | 660 | 1312 | 934 | 1036 | 4982 | 14531 |
| 9 | Poland | Wieslaw Chmielewski | 576 | 847 | 1224 | 758 | 1096 | 4501 | 14531 |
| 10 | West Germany | Marcus Marsollek | 858 | 847 | 1140 | 1044 | 1075 | 4964 | 14511 |
| 10 | West Germany | Michael Zimmermann | 950 | 813 | 1240 | 824 | 955 | 4782 | 14511 |
| 10 | West Germany | Dirk Knappheide | 1034 | 677 | 1272 | 934 | 848 | 4765 | 14511 |
| 11 | Canada | Lawrence Keyte | 1032 | 609 | 1092 | 934 | 1180 | 4847 | 14309 |
| 11 | Canada | Nicholas Fekete | 1024 | 711 | 1160 | 956 | 934 | 4785 | 14309 |
| 11 | Canada | Barry Kennedy | 770 | 728 | 1128 | 1000 | 1051 | 4677 | 14309 |
| 12 | Sweden | Svante Rasmuson | 916 | 830 | 1232 | 934 | 1075 | 4987 | 14205 |
| 12 | Sweden | Jan-Erik Danielsson | 890 | 864 | 1140 | 1044 | 1018 | 4956 | 14205 |
| 12 | Sweden | Roderick Martin | 0 | 915 | 1276 | 1044 | 1027 | 4262 | 14205 |
| 13 | Egypt | Mohamed Abouelsouad | 1100 | 694 | 1072 | 1044 | 943 | 4853 | 14113 |
| 13 | Egypt | Ayman Mahmoud | 946 | 609 | 1176 | 890 | 1054 | 4675 | 14113 |
| 13 | Egypt | Mostafa Adam | 1012 | 728 | 1140 | 912 | 793 | 4585 | 14113 |
| 14 | South Korea | Kim Myung-Gon | 1040 | 762 | 1252 | 1066 | 979 | 5099 | 14027 |
| 14 | South Korea | Kang Kyung-Hyo | 1070 | 830 | 1264 | 868 | 1042 | 5074 | 14027 |
| 14 | South Korea | Kim Sung-Ho | 0 | 609 | 1248 | 1000 | 997 | 3854 | 14027 |
| 15 | Bahrain | Ahmed Al Doseri | 816 | 735 | 1020 | 890 | 1180 | 4641 | 13743 |
| 15 | Bahrain | Saleh Farhan | 824 | 847 | 1112 | 736 | 1081 | 4600 | 13743 |
| 15 | Bahrain | Abdul Rahman Khalid | 628 | 650 | 1088 | 1088 | 1048 | 4502 | 13743 |
| 16 | United States | Robert Nieman | 944 | 932 | 1248 | 1000 | 910 | 5034 | 13645 |
| 16 | United States | Robert Stull | 470 | 983 | 1240 | 868 | 1027 | 4588 | 13645 |
| 16 | United States | Michael Gostigan | 0 | 820 | 1264 | 1044 | 895 | 4023 | 13645 |
| 17 | Japan | Hiroshi Saito | 1096 | 718 | 976 | 956 | 1135 | 4881 | 13120 |
| 17 | Japan | Tadafumi Miwa | 962 | 582 | 1080 | 956 | 937 | 4517 | 13120 |
| 17 | Japan | Hiroaki Izumikawa | 0 | 694 | 1008 | 846 | 1174 | 3722 | 13120 |
| 18 | Chile | Julio Fuentes | 782 | 548 | 1156 | 956 | 883 | 4325 | 12797 |
| 18 | Chile | Ricardo Falconi | 980 | 575 | 1112 | 736 | 913 | 4316 | 12797 |
| 18 | Chile | Gerardo Cortes | 950 | 762 | 1104 | 406 | 934 | 4156 | 12797 |
| AC | Spain | Eduardo Quesada | 1010 | 762 | 1256 | 626 | 1198 | 4852 | 9666 |
| AC | Spain | Leopoldo Centeno | 797 | 643 | 1256 | 956 | 1162 | 4814 | 9666 |
| AC | Spain | Jorge Quesada | | | | | | DSQ | 9666 |
