= Modern pentathlon at the 1992 Summer Olympics – Men's individual =

Men's individual modern pentathlon at the Games of the XXV Olympiad
- Dates: July 26–29
- Competitors: 66 from 30 nations

Medalists
1st place, gold medalist(s)		Arkadiusz Skrzypaszek	Poland
2nd place, silver medalist(s)		Attila Mizsér	Hungary
3rd place, bronze medalist(s)		Eduard Zenovka	Unified Team

The modern pentathlon at the 1992 Summer Olympics was represented by two events (both for men): Individual competition and Team competition. As usual in Olympic modern pentathlon, one competition was held and each competitor's score was included to the Individual competition event results table and was also added to his teammates' scores to be included to the Team competition event results table. This competition consisted of 5 disciplines:

- Fencing, held on July 26 at the Palau de la Metal-lúrgia
- Swimming, held on July 27 at the Piscines Bernat Picornell
- Shooting, held on July 27 at the Camp de Tir Olímpic de Mollet
- Running, held on July 28 at Circuit de Cros
- Equestrian held on July 29 at the Real Club de Polo

== Results ==
Pos	Athlete	Nation	Fen.	Swi.	Sho.	Run.	Rid.	Score
1st place, gold medalist(s)	Arkadiusz Skrzypaszek	Poland	1000	1252	1120	1147	1040	5559
2nd place, silver medalist(s)	Attila Mizsér	Hungary	898	1208	1135	1213	992	5446
3rd place, bronze medalist(s)	Eduard Zenovka	Unified Team	830	1300	1240	1255	736	5361
4	Anatoli Starostin	Unified Team	864	1236	1120	1117	1010	5347
5	Roberto Bomprezzi	Italy	847	1148	1105	1216	1010	5326
6	Håkan Norebrink	Sweden	847	1272	1030	1072	1100	5321
7	Marian Gheorghe	Romania	878	1252	955	1108	1100	5293
8	Graham Raymond Brookhouse	Great Britain	762	1304	1015	1141	1070	5292
9	Michael Gostigian	United States	728	1324	1105	1138	980	5275
10	Dariusz Gozdziak	Poland	796	1108	1195	1135	1020	5254
11	Sébastien Deleigne	France	779	1228	1030	1174	1040	5251
12	Carlo Massullo	Italy	677	1200	1150	1123	1100	5250
13	Richard Phelps	Great Britain	932	1312	925	1177	900	5246
14	Petr Blažek	Czechoslovakia	847	1244	1120	1078	950	5239
15	Gintaras Staškevičius	Lithuania	745	1352	1060	1237	840	5234
16	Peter Steinmann	Switzerland	820	1288	940	1204	980	5232
17	Joël Bouzou	France	830	1156	1060	1132	1038	5216
18	Dmitri Svatkovskiy	Unified Team	796	1224	985	1201	1010	5216
19	Maciej Czyzowicz	Poland	779	1272	1105	1087	962	5205
20	Rob Stull	United States	983	1232	1000	1114	875	5204
21	Lee Young-Chan	South Korea	864	1240	1030	994	1070	5198
22	Dirk Knappheide	Germany	864	1264	1060	1057	950	5195
23	Gianluca Tiberti	Italy	864	1292	1075	913	1040	5184
24	Josué Ivan Ortega Enríquez	Mexico	796	1252	1105	1210	814	5177
25	James W. Haley	United States	796	1256	1090	988	1040	5170
26	Kirils Medjancevs	Latvia	949	1276	955	934	1040	5154
27	Jesús Centeno Moyer	Spain	796	1240	865	1177	1070	5148
28	Per Nyqvist	Sweden	762	1184	1090	1117	976	5129
29	Tomáš Fleissner	Czechoslovakia	830	1176	1090	1012	1020	5128
30	Gavin Wayne Lackey	Australia	694	1272	955	1222	968	5111
31	Alexandros Nikolopoulos	Greece	541	1320	1135	1060	1010	5066
32	László Fábián	Hungary	1034	1284	820	1126	800	5064
33	Attila Kalnoki-Kis	Hungary	864	1204	1045	1150	798	5061
34	Mostafa Adam	Egypt	830	1148	1105	934	1040	5057
35	Alejandro Yrizar Barranco	Mexico	915	1256	1075	1030	780	5056
36	Dominic J. Mahony	Great Britain	796	1140	895	1162	1040	5033
37	Leopoldo Centeno Moyer	Spain	728	1240	865	1135	1050	5018
38	Kim Myung-Kun	South Korea	813	1240	1030	1042	890	5015
39	Imre Tiidemann	Estonia	796	1208	1030	1276	670	4980
40	Per Olov Danielsson	Sweden	813	1212	985	1048	920	4978
41	Christophe Ruer	France	779	1320	1030	1240	605	4974
42	Stefan Gueorguiev Assenov	Bulgaria	711	1272	1090	1030	860	4963
43	Ian Blair Soellner	Canada	762	1200	925	988	1070	4945
44	Mohamed Abouelsouad	Egypt	660	1068	1165	1069	960	4922
45	Ulrich Andreas Czermak	Germany	830	1200	1060	1147	656	4893
46	Valentin Jordanov Djavelkov	Bulgaria	762	1184	1015	1015	890	4866
47	Sergio Werner Sánchez Gómez	Guatemala	599	1080	1060	1021	1100	4860
48	Hiroshi Miyagahara	Japan	633	1136	1060	1114	916	4859
49	Pawel Olszewski	Germany	796	1240	1000	1009	798	4843
50	Trevor Strydom	South Africa	507	1192	1150	961	1010	4820
51	Vladimiras Mocialovas	Lithuania	660	1204	880	1231	830	4805
52	Stanislavs Dobrotvorskis	Latvia	762	1176	1075	931	852	4796
53	Manuel Barroso	Portugal	541	1248	595	1327	1008	4719
54	Alberto Felix Miranda	Mexico	847	1132	505	1147	1070	4701
55	Carlos Lerin	Spain	643	1180	1000	1210	661	4694
56	Zhang Bin	China	694	1108	1045	847	976	4670
57	Jiří Prokopius	Czechoslovakia	813	1232	1060	982	548	4635
58	Colin Michael Hamilton	Australia	439	1252	970	1153	780	4594
59	Laurie Shong	Canada	813	1268	925	913	660	4579
60	Sharif Elerian	Egypt	643	1156	910	919	910	4538
61	Kim In-Ho	South Korea	643	1284	760	1066	750	4503
62	Tomas Narkus	Lithuania	694	1224	1210	1153	DNF	4281
63	Alexander Watson	Australia	643	1176	1030	472	958	4279
64	Vjaceslavs Duhanovs	Latvia	796	1184	940	883	DSQ	3803
65	Luis Urteaga Castañeda	Peru	541	1016	865	1081	DSQ	3503
66	Daniel Rimmus Pereyra Curti	Uruguay	405	968	820	736	DSQ	2929
