= Modern pentathlon at the 1992 Summer Olympics – Men's team =

Men's modern pentathlon at the Games of the XXV Olympiad
- Dates: July 26–29
- Competitors: 51 from 17 nations

Medalists
1st place, gold medalist(s)		Maciej Czyżowicz; Dariusz Goździak; Arkadiusz Skrzypaszek	Poland
2nd place, silver medalist(s)		Anatoli Starostin; Dmitri Svatkovskiy; Eduard Zenovka	Unified Team
3rd place, bronze medalist(s)		Roberto Bomprezzi; Carlo Massullo; Gianluca Tiberti	Italy

The modern pentathlon at the 1992 Summer Olympics was represented by two events (both for men): Individual competition and Team competition. As usual in Olympic modern pentathlon, one competition was held and each competitor's score was included to the Individual competition event results table and was also added to his teammates' scores to be included to the Team competition event results table. This competition consisted of 5 disciplines:

- Fencing, held on July 26 at the Palau de la Metal-lúrgia
- Swimming, held on July 27 at the Piscines Bernat Picornell
- Shooting, held on July 27 at the Camp de Tir Olímpic de Mollet
- Running, held on July 28 at Circuit de Cros
- Equestrian held on July 29 at the Real Club de Polo

== Results ==
Pos	Nation	Athlete	Fen.	Swi.	Sho.	Run.	Rid.	Score	Team Score
1st place, gold medalist(s)	Poland	Arkadiusz Skrzypaszek	1000	1252	1120	1147	1040	5559	16018
1st place, gold medalist(s)	Poland	Dariusz Gozdziak	796	1108	1195	1135	1020	5254	16018
1st place, gold medalist(s)	Poland	Maciej Czyzowicz	779	1272	1105	1087	962	5205	16018
2nd place, silver medalist(s)	Unified Team	Eduard Zenovka	830	1300	1240	1255	736	5361	15924
2nd place, silver medalist(s)	Unified Team	Anatoli Starostin	864	1236	1120	1117	1010	5347	15924
2nd place, silver medalist(s)	Unified Team	Dmitri Svatkovskiy	796	1224	985	1201	1010	5216	15924
3rd place, bronze medalist(s)	Italy	Roberto Bomprezzi	847	1148	1105	1216	1010	5326	15760
3rd place, bronze medalist(s)	Italy	Carlo Massullo	677	1200	1150	1123	1100	5250	15760
3rd place, bronze medalist(s)	Italy	Gianluca Tiberti	864	1292	1075	913	1040	5184	15760
4	United States	Michael Gostigian	728	1324	1105	1138	980	5275	15649
4	United States	Rob Stull	983	1232	1000	1114	875	5204	15649
4	United States	James W. Haley	796	1256	1090	988	1040	5170	15649
5	Hungary	Attila Mizsér	898	1208	1135	1213	992	5446	15571
5	Hungary	László Fábián	1034	1284	820	1126	800	5064	15571
5	Hungary	Attila Kalnoki-Kis	864	1204	1045	1150	798	5061	15571
6	Great Britain	Graham Raymond Brookhouse	762	1304	1015	1141	1070	5292	15571
6	Great Britain	Richard Phelps	932	1312	925	1177	900	5246	15571
6	Great Britain	Dominic J. Mahony	796	1140	895	1162	1040	5033	15571
7	France	Sébastien Deleigne	779	1228	1030	1174	1040	5251	15441
7	France	Joël Bouzou	830	1156	1060	1132	1038	5216	15441
7	France	Christophe Ruer	779	1320	1030	1240	605	4974	15441
8	Sweden	Håkan Norebrink	847	1272	1030	1072	1100	5321	15428
8	Sweden	Per Nyqvist	762	1184	1090	1117	976	5129	15428
8	Sweden	Per Olov Danielsson	813	1212	985	1048	920	4978	15428
9	Czechoslovakia	Petr Blazek	847	1244	1120	1078	950	5239	15002
9	Czechoslovakia	Tomáš Fleissner	830	1176	1090	1012	1020	5128	15002
9	Czechoslovakia	Jirí Prokopius	813	1232	1060	982	548	4635	15002
10	Mexico	Josué Ivan Ortega Enríquez	796	1252	1105	1210	814	5177	14934
10	Mexico	Alejandro Yrizar Barranco	915	1256	1075	1030	780	5056	14934
10	Mexico	Alberto Felix Miranda	847	1132	505	1147	1070	4701	14934
11	Germany	Dirk Knappheide	864	1264	1060	1057	950	5195	14931
11	Germany	Ulrich Andreas Czermak	830	1200	1060	1147	656	4893,	14931
11	Germany	Pawel Olszewski	796	1240	1000	1009	798	4843	14931
12	Spain	Jesús Centeno Moyer	796	1240	865	1177	1070	5148	14860
12	Spain	Leopoldo Centeno Moyer	728	1240	865	1135	1050	5018	14860
12	Spain	Carlos Lerin	643	1180	1000	1210	661	4694	14860
13	South Korea	Lee Young-Chan	864	1240	1030	994	1070	5198	14716
13	South Korea	Kim Myung-Kun	813	1240	1030	1042	890	5015	14716
13	South Korea	Kim In-Ho	643	1284	760	1066	750	4503	14716
14	Egypt	Mostafa Adam	830	1148	1105	934	1040	5057	14517
14	Egypt	Mohamed Abouelsouad	660	1068	1165	1069	960	4922	14517
14	Egypt	Sharif Elerian	643	1156	910	919	910	4538	14517
15	Lithuania	Gintaras Staskevicius	745	1352	1060	1237	840	5234	14320
15	Lithuania	Vladimiras Mocialovas	660	1204	880	1231	830	4805	14320
15	Lithuania	Tomas Narkus	694	1224	1210	1153	DNF	4281	14320
16	Australia	Gavin Wayne Lackey	694	1272	955	1222	968	5111	13984
16	Australia	Colin Michael Hamilton	439	1252	970	1153	780	4594	13984
16	Australia	Alexander Watson	643	1176	1030	472	958	4279	13984
17	Latvia	Kirils Medjancevs	949	1276	955	934	1040	5154	13753
17	Latvia	Stanislavs Dobrotvorskis	762	1176	1075	931	852	4796	13753
17	Latvia	Vjaceslavs Duhanovs	796	1184	940	883	DSQ	3803	13753
