= Modern pentathlon at the 1984 Summer Olympics – Men's individual =

Men's individual modern pentathlon at the Games of the XXIII Olympiad
- Venue: Coto Equestrian Center
- Dates: July 29 - August 1
- Competitors: 52 from 18 nations

Medalists
1st place, gold medalist(s)		Daniele Masala	Italy
2nd place, silver medalist(s)		Svante Rasmuson	Sweden
3rd place, bronze medalist(s)		Carlo Massullo	Italy

The modern pentathlon at the 1984 Summer Olympics was represented by two events: Individual competition and Team competition. As usual in Olympic modern pentathlon, one competition was held and each competitor's score was included to the Individual competition event results table and was also added to his teammates' scores to be included to the Team competition event results table. This competition consisted of 5 disciplines:

- Equestrian, held on July 29.
- Fencing, held on July 30.
- Swimming, held on July 31.
- Shooting, held on August 1.
- Cross-country, also held on August 1.

The event took place at the Coto Equestrian Center in Southern Orange County, California.

== Results ==
Rank	Pentathlete	Nation	Rid.	Fen.	Sho.	Swi.	Run.	Total
1st place, gold medalist(s)	Daniele Masala	ITA	1100	956	1300	978	1135	5469
2nd place, silver medalist(s)	Svante Rasmuson	SWE	1070	1022	1304	912	1148	5456
3rd place, bronze medalist(s)	Carlo Massullo	ITA	1100	758	1220	1066	1262	5406
4	Richard Phelps	GBR	1100	912	1304	780	1295	5391
5	Michael Storm	USA	1040	868	1288	1088	1041	5325
6	Paul Four	FRA	1040	978	1204	1066	999	5287
7	Ivar Sisniega Campbell	MEX	1070	912	1320	780	1200	5282
8	Jorge Quesada	ESP	1060	890	1172	1000	1159	5281
9	Pasi Hulkkonen	FIN	1010	846	1272	956	1109	5193
10	Didier Boube	FRA	1070	890	1144	912	1170	5186
11	Pier Paolo Cristofori	ITA	1040	846	1196	868	1235	5185
12	Andy Jung	SUI	1070	846	1244	978	1025	5163
13	Robert Gregory Losey	USA	1062	912	1160	956	1068	5158
14	Achim Bellmann	FRG	954	1066	1164	736	1194	5114
15	Alexander Watson	AUS	1010	758	1196	934	1210	5108
16	Peter Steinmann	SUI	1040	824	1168	934	1138	5104
17	Joel Bouzou	FRA	884	758	1136	1066	1248	5092
18	Dean Glenesk	USA	1086	824	1252	758	1165	5085
19	Peter Minder	SUI	980	846	1152	1044	1054	5076
20	Alejandro Yrizar Barranco	MEX	968	824	1228	1000	1029	5049
21	Michael Rehbein	FRG	1034	714	1248	912	1113	5021
22	Jorma Korpela	FIN	980	758	1224	956	1050	4968
23	Marcelo Hoyo	MEX	1018	714	1156	868	1196	4952
24	Michael Mumford	GBR	950	802	1236	912	1040	4940
25	Saleh Sultan Faraj	BRN	1070	890	1160	978	814	4912
26	Eduardo Burguete	ESP	1006	736	1308	670	1175	4895
27	Christian Sandow	FRG	1070	714	1324	648	1137	4893
28	Shoji Uchida	JPN	1010	780	1028	868	1143	4829
29	Hiroyuki Kawazoe	JPN	1040	868	1036	912	953	4809
30	Martin Lamprecht	SWE	706	912	1300	934	951	4803
31	Matthew Spies	AUS	1010	692	1140	802	1134	4778
32	Michael Billwein	AUT	1070	670	1116	912	992	4760
33	Ihab Ellebedy	EGY	1100	792	920	978	955	4745
34	Federico Galera	ESP	1040	582	1088	846	1159	4715
35	Jussi Pelli	FIN	846	780	1124	934	982	4666
36	Samy Awad	EGY	1040	758	1096	912	828	4634
37	Stephen Sowerby	GBR	555	648	1224	934	1202	4563
38	Chung Kyung-Hoon	KOR	904	560	1080	978	1025	4547
39	Ahmed Nasser	EGY	728	736	1060	1044	961	4529
40	Abdulraman Jasem	BRN	916	494	1132	1022	926	4490
41	Nabeel Mubarak	BRN	1018	692	932	846	976	4464
42	Kim Il	KOR	994	692	1048	868	785	4387
43	Luis Monteiro	POR	1070	472	1016	868	906	4332
44	Roberto Durao	POR	918	736	904	956	807	4321
45	Kang Kyung-Hyo	KOR	738	516	1244	824	990	4312
46	Daizou Araki	JPN	1100	538	1108	494	1042	4282
47	Roderick Martin	SWE	1012	868	1268	0	1057	4205
48	Chen Kung-Liang	TPE	848	494	1024	890	931	4187
49	Manuel Barroso	POR	818	670	1200	340	1057	4085
50	Daniel Esposito	AUS	0	582	1300	890	1181	3953
51	Ingo Peirits	AUT	0	780	1080	824	998	3682
52	Horst Stocker	AUT	0	704	1024	736	968	3432
