= Modern pentathlon at the 1984 Summer Olympics – Men's team =

Men's team modern pentathlon at the Games of the XXIII Olympiad
- Venue: Coto Equestrian Center
- Dates: July 29 - August 1
- Competitors: 51 from 17 nations

Medalists
1st place, gold medalist(s)		Pier Paolo Cristofori; Daniele Masala; Carlo Massullo	Italy
2nd place, silver medalist(s)		Dean Glenesk; Robert Gregory Losey; Michael Storm	United States
3rd place, bronze medalist(s)		Didier Boube; Joel Bouzou; Paul Four	France

The modern pentathlon at the 1984 Summer Olympics was represented by two events: Individual competition and Team competition. As usual in Olympic modern pentathlon, one competition was held and each competitor's score was included to the Individual competition event results table and was also added to his teammates' scores to be included to the Team competition event results table. This competition consisted of 5 disciplines:

- Equestrian, held on July 29.
- Fencing, held on July 30.
- Swimming, held on July 31.
- Shooting, held on August 1.
- Cross-country, also held on August 1.

The event took place at the Coto Equestrian Center in Southern Orange County, California.

== Results ==
Rank	Nation	Pentathletes	Rid.	Fen.	Sho.	Swi.	Run.	Score	Team Score
1st place, gold medalist(s)	ITA	Daniele Masala	1100	956	1300	978	1135	5469	16060
1st place, gold medalist(s)	ITA	Carlo Massullo	1100	758	1220	1066	1262	5406	16060
1st place, gold medalist(s)	ITA	Pier Paolo Cristofori	1040	846	1196	868	1235	5185	16060
2nd place, silver medalist(s)	USA	Michael Storm	1040	868	1288	1088	1041	5325	15568
2nd place, silver medalist(s)	USA	Robert Gregory Losey	1062	912	1160	956	1068	5158	15568
2nd place, silver medalist(s)	USA	Dean Glenesk	1086	824	1252	758	1165	5085	15568
3rd place, bronze medalist(s)	FRA	Paul Four	1040	978	1204	1066	999	5287	15565
3rd place, bronze medalist(s)	FRA	Didier Boube	1070	890	1144	912	1170	5186	15565
3rd place, bronze medalist(s)	FRA	Joel Bouzou	884	758	1136	1066	1248	5092	15565
4	SUI	Andy Jung	1070	846	1244	978	1025	5163	15343
4	SUI	Peter Steinmann	1040	824	1168	934	1138	5104	15343
4	SUI	Peter Minder	980	846	1152	1044	1054	5076	15343
5	MEX	Ivar Sisniega Campbell	1070	912	1320	780	1200	5282	15283
5	MEX	Alejandro Yrizar Barranco	968	824	1228	1000	1029	5049	15283
5	MEX	Marcelo Hoyo	1018	714	1156	868	1196	4952	15283
6	FRG	Achim Bellmann	954	1066	1164	736	1194	5114	15028
6	FRG	Michael Rehbein	1034	714	1248	912	1113	5021	15028
6	FRG	Christian Sandow	1070	714	1324	648	1137	4893	15028
7	GBR	Richard Phelps	1100	912	1304	780	1295	5391	14894
7	GBR	Michael Mumford	950	802	1236	912	1040	4940	14894
7	GBR	Stephen Sowerby	555	648	1224	934	1202	4563	14894
8	ESP	Jorge Quesada	1060	890	1172	1000	1159	5281	14891
8	ESP	Eduardo Burguete	1006	736	1308	670	1175	4895	14891
8	ESP	Federico Galera	1040	582	1088	846	1159	4715	14891
9	FIN	Pasi Hulkkonen	1010	846	1272	956	1109	5193	14827
9	FIN	Jorma Korpela	980	758	1224	956	1050	4968	14827
9	FIN	Jussi Pelli	846	780	1124	934	982	4666	14827
10	SWE	Svante Rasmuson	1070	1022	1304	912	1148	5456	14464
10	SWE	Martin Lamprecht	706	912	1300	934	951	4803	14464
10	SWE	Roderick Martin	1012	868	1268	0	1057	4205	14464
11	JPN	Shoji Uchida	1010	780	1028	868	1143	4829	13920
11	JPN	Hiroyuki Kawazoe	1040	868	1036	912	953	4809	13920
11	JPN	Daizou Araki	1100	538	1108	494	1042	4282	13920
12	EGY	Ihab Ellebedy	1100	792	920	978	955	4745	13908
12	EGY	Samy Awad	1040	758	1096	912	828	4634	13908
12	EGY	Ahmed Nasser	728	736	1060	1044	961	4529	13908
13	BRN	Saleh Sultan Faraj	1070	890	1160	978	814	4912	13866
13	BRN	Abdulraman Jasem	916	494	1132	1022	926	4490	13866
13	BRN	Nabeel Mubarak	1018	692	932	846	976	4464	13866
14	AUS	Alexander Watson	1010	758	1196	934	1210	5108	13839
14	AUS	Matthew Spies	1010	692	1140	802	1134	4778	13839
14	AUS	Daniel Esposito	0	582	1300	890	1181	3953	13839
15	KOR	Chung Kyung-Hoon	904	560	1080	978	1025	4547	13246
15	KOR	Kim Il	994	692	1048	868	785	4387	13246
15	KOR	Kang Kyung-Hyo	738	516	1244	824	990	4312	13246
16	POR	Luis Monteiro	1070	472	1016	868	906	4332	12738
16	POR	Roberto Durao	918	736	904	956	807	4321	12738
16	POR	Manuel Barroso	818	670	1200	340	1057	4085	12738
17	AUT	Michael Billwein	1070	670	1116	912	992	4760	11874
17	AUT	Ingo Peirits	0	780	1080	824	998	3682	11874
17	AUT	Horst Stocker	0	704	1024	736	968	3432	11874
