= Modern pentathlon at the Friendship Games =

Modern pentathlon at the Friendship Games took place in Warsaw, Poland between 5 and 9 August 1984. 45 athletes took part in two men's events (individual and team competition).

== Events ==
Event	Gold		Silver		Bronze	
Individual competition	László Fábián (HUN)	5670	Anatoli Starostin (URS)	5650	Milan Kadlec (TCH)	5497
Team competition	Hungary (HUN); László Fábián; Attila Mizsér; Tamás Szombathelyi; József Buzgó	16371	Czechoslovakia (TCH); Milan Kadlec; Jan Bártů; Dušan Poláček; David Kustka	15918	Soviet Union (URS); Anatoli Starostin; Yevgeny Lipeyev; Aleksander Taryev; Igor Shvartz	15801

== Medal table ==
Rank	Nation	Gold	Silver	Bronze	Total
1	Hungary (HUN)	2	0	0	2
2	Czechoslovakia (TCH)	0	1	1	2
2	Soviet Union (URS)	0	1	1	2
Totals (3 entries)		2	2	2	6

== See also ==
- Modern pentathlon at the 1984 Summer Olympics
