= Abdul Rahman Jassim =

Bahraini modern pentathlete

Personal information
- Born: 1 January 1966 (age 60)

Sport
- Sport: Modern pentathlon

Abdul Rahman Jassim (Arabic: عبد الرحمن جاسم; born 1 January 1966) is a Bahraini modern pentathlete. As one of the first Bahraini Olympians that competed at the 1984 Summer Olympics, he finished 40th in the individual event and 13th in the team event. He has also competed at the 2000 World Modern Pentathlon Championships.

== Biography ==
Abdul Rahman Jassim was born on 1 January 1966. As a modern pentathlete, he represented Bahrain in international competition.

At the age of 18, he was selected to compete for Bahrain at the 1984 Summer Olympics held in Los Angeles, United States, for Bahrain's debut at any edition of the Olympic Games. There, he competed in two events, the men's individual and men's team event alongside Saleh Sultan Faraj and Nabeel Saleh Mubarak. From 29 July up to 1 August the team competed in individual events which tallied up to the team total score. Jassim recorded 4490 points after all of the events, placing 40th out of the 53 modern pentathletes that competed. As a team, they placed 13th out of the 17 that competed.

In 1999, Jassim competed in the first edition of the Asian Modern Pentathlon Championships on 4 October held in Bishkek, Kygyzstan. He competed in the men's individual event in qualification Group B. There, he recorded 3737 points after all of the events and did not manage to advance to the finals of the event after placing 17th in his group, not high enough to progress. The following year, he competed in the 2000 World Modern Pentathlon Championships held in Pesaro, Italy. He competed in the qualification rounds in Group D, recording 3737 points and placing 17th again, failing to advance to the finals.

Outside of competing in the modern pentathlon, Jassim works as a swimming coach.
