= Chile at the 1988 Summer Olympics =

- IOC code: CHI
- NOC: Chilean Olympic Committee

in Seoul
- Competitors: 17 (16 men and 1 woman) in 6 sports
- Flag bearer: Gert Weil
- Medals Ranked 36th: Gold 0 Silver 1 Bronze 0 Total 1

Summer Olympics appearances (overview)
- 1896; 1900–1908; 1912; 1920; 1924; 1928; 1932; 1936; 1948; 1952; 1956; 1960; 1964; 1968; 1972; 1976; 1980; 1984; 1988; 1992; 1996; 2000; 2004; 2008; 2012; 2016; 2020; 2024

Chile competed at the 1988 Summer Olympics in Seoul, South Korea. This was the nation's sixteenth appearance at the Summer Olympics, after debuting in 1896. 17 competitors, 16 men and 1 woman, took part in 14 events in 6 sports. Alfonso de Iruarrizaga's silver in skeet shooting was Chile's only medal at the 1988 Games.

== Medalists ==
Medal	Name	Sport	Event	Date
Silver	Alfonso de Iruarrizaga	Shooting	Skeet	24 September

== Competitors ==
The following is the list of number of competitors in the Games.

Sport	Men	Women	Total
Athletics	5	0	5
Modern pentathlon	3	–	3
Rowing	2	0	2
Sailing	3	0	3
Shooting	1	0	1
Table tennis	2	1	3
Total	16	1	17

== Athletics ==
Men
Track and road events

Athlete	Event	Heat Round 1		Heat Round 2		Semifinal		Final	
Athlete	Event	Time	Rank	Time	Rank	Time	Rank	Time	Rank
Carlos Bernardo Moreno	100 metres	10.70	45	Did not advance					
Carlos Bernardo Moreno	200 metres	22.13	59	Did not advance					
Pablo Squella	800 metres	1:48.99	27 Q	1:46.45	17	Did not advance			
Omar Aguilar	Marathon	—						DNF	
Emilio Ulloa	3000 metres steeplechase	DNF		—		Did not advance			

Field events

Athlete	Event	Qualification		Final	
Athlete	Event	Distance	Position	Distance	Position
Gert Weil	Shot put	20.18	7 q	20.38	6

== Modern pentathlon ==
Three male pentathletes represented Chile in 1988.

Athlete	Event	Riding (show jumping)			Fencing (épée one touch)			Swimming (300 m freestyle)			Shooting (Rapid fire pistol)			Running (4000 m)			Total points	Final rank
Athlete	Event	Penalties	Rank	MP points	Results	Rank	MP points	Time	Rank	MP points	Points	Rank	MP Points	Time	Rank	MP Points	Total points	Final rank
Gerardo Cortés	Individual	150	31	950	31	30	762	3:41.34	52	1104	167	63	406	14:37.63	52	934	4156	57
Ricardo Falconi	Individual	120	24	980	20	62	575	3:40.46	50	1112	182	60	736	14:44.71	54	913	4316	55
Julio Fuentes	Individual	318	51	782	19	63	548	3:34.52	42	1156	192	17	956	14:54.52	58	883	4325	54
Gerardo Cortés; Ricardo Falconi; Julio Fuentes	Team	588	11	2712	70	18	1885	10:56.32	16	3372	541	18	2098	44:16.86	17	2730	12797	18

== Rowing ==
Men

Athlete	Event	Heats		Repechage		Semifinals		Final	
Athlete	Event	Time	Rank	Time	Rank	Time	Rank	Time	Rank
Alejandro Rojas; Marcelo Rojas	Double sculls	6:33.23	5 R	6:48.72	4	Did not advance			

== Sailing ==
Open

Athlete	Event	Race							Net points	Final rank
Athlete	Event	1	2	3	4	5	6	7	Net points	Final rank
Germán Schacht; Manuel González; Rodrigo Zuazola	Soling	24	20	25	25	~~27~~	24	27	145	20

== Shooting ==
Mixed

Athlete	Event	Qualification		Final	
Athlete	Event	Points	Rank	Points	Rank
Alfonso de Iruarrízaga	Skeet	198	1 Q	221	2nd place, silver medalist(s)

== Table tennis ==
Men

Athlete	Event	Group Stage								Round of 16	Quarterfinal	Semifinal	Final	
Athlete	Event	Opposition Result	Opposition Result	Opposition Result	Opposition Result	Opposition Result	Opposition Result	Opposition Result	Rank	Opposition Result	Opposition Result	Opposition Result	Opposition Result	Rank
Jorge Gambra	Singles	Persson (SWE); L 0–3	Saito (JPN); L 0–3	Mehta (IND); L 0–3	Domuschiev (BUL); L 2–3	Molenda (POL); L 1–3	El-Saket (EGY); W 3–0	Kim (KOR); L 1–3	7	Did not advance				
Marcos Núñez	Singles	Ono (JPN); L 0–3	Liu (HKG); L 0–3	Kim (KOR); L 0–3	Mazunov (URS); L 0–3	Costantini (ITA); L 0–3	Jones (JAM); W 3–1	Lupulesku (YUG); L 0–3	7	Did not advance				
Jorge Gambra; Marcos Núñez	Doubles	Grubba / Kucharski (POL); L 0–2	Roßkopf / Fetzner (FRG); L 0–2	Saito / Watanabe (JPN); L 0–3	Kawai / Kano (BRA); L 0–2	Lo / Vong (HKG); L 0–2	Adeyemo / Bankole (NGR); W 2–1	Ahn / Yoo (KOR); L 0–2	7	Did not advance				

Women

Athlete	Event	Group Stage						Round of 16	Quarterfinal	Semifinal	Final	
Athlete	Event	Opposition Result	Opposition Result	Opposition Result	Opposition Result	Opposition Result	Rank	Opposition Result	Opposition Result	Opposition Result	Opposition Result	Rank
Jacqueline Díaz	Singles	Nemes (FRG); L 0–3	Kloppenburg (NED); L 0–3	Bátorfi (HUN); L 0–3	Akanmu (NGR); W 3–1	Hong (KOR); L 0–3	5	Did not advance				

== See also ==
- Chile at the 1987 Pan American Games
