= Modern pentathlon at the 1987 Pan American Games =

Modern pentathlon was one of the sports contested at the 1987 Pan American Games in Indianapolis in Indiana, United States.

== Events ==
Event	Gold	Silver	Bronze
Men's	Robert Stull; United States	Barry Kennedy; Canada	Harvey Cain; United States

== Medal table ==
Rank	Nation	Gold	Silver	Bronze	Total
1	United States	1	0	1	2
2	Canada	0	1	0	1
Totals (2 entries)		1	1	1	3
