= Gerardo Cortes =

Gerardo Cortes can refer to:

- Gerardo Cortés (born 1988), a Chilean footballer
- Gerardo Cortes Sr. (born 1928), a Chilean modern pentathlete
- Gerardo Cortes Jr. (born 1959), a Chilean modern pentathlete, and son of Gerardo Cortes Sr.
