= László Fábián =

László Fábián may refer to:

- László Fábián (pentathlete) (born 1963), Hungarian Olympic modern pentathlete and fencer
- László Fábián (canoeist) (1936–2018), Hungarian Olympic sprint canoer
