= Bahrain at the 1988 Summer Olympics =

- IOC code: BRN
- NOC: Bahrain Olympic Committee

in Seoul
- Competitors: 7 (all men) in 4 sports
- Flag bearer: Ahmed Hamada
- Officials: 10
- Medals: Gold 0 Silver 0 Bronze 0 Total 0

Summer Olympics appearances (overview)
- 1984; 1988; 1992; 1996; 2000; 2004; 2008; 2012; 2016; 2020; 2024

Bahrain competed at the 1988 Summer Olympics in Seoul, South Korea. Seven competitors, all men, took part in seven events in three sports.

== Competitors ==
The following is the list of number of competitors in the Games.

Sport	Men	Women	Total
Athletics	3	0	3
Fencing	4	0	4
Modern pentathlon	3	–	3
Total	7	0	7

== Athletics ==
=== Men ===
==== Track events ====
Athlete	Events	Heat		Semifinal		Final	
Athlete	Events	Time	Position	Time	Position	Time	Position
Abdullah Al-Dosari	3000 m Steeplechase	9:10.85	29	Did not advance			
Khalid Goma	100 m	10.80	69	Did not advance			
Ahmed Hamada Jassim	400 m hurdles	51.34	29	Did not advance			

== Fencing ==
Four fencers, all men, represented Bahrain in 1988.

Athlete	Event	Preliminary Round	Round of 16	Quarterfinals	Semifinals	Final	Final Rank
Athlete	Event	Opposition Score	Opposition Score	Opposition Score	Opposition Score	Opposition Score	Final Rank
Ahmed Al Doseri	Épée		Did not advance				69
Saleh Farhan	Épée		Did not advance				68
Abdul Rahman Khalid	Épée		Did not advance				66
Ahmed Al Doseri; Abdul Rahman Khalid; Khalifa Khamis; Saleh Farhan	Team épée	Sweden (SWE); L 3–9 Hungary (HUN); L 1–9	Did not advance				16

== Modern pentathlon ==
Three male pentathletes represented Bahrain in 1988.

Men

Athlete	Event	Shooting			Fencing			Swimming			Riding			Running			Total	Rank
Athlete	Event	Rings	Points	Rank	Record	Points	Rank	Time	Points	Rank	Time/Penalty	Points	Rank	Time	Points	Rank	Total	Rank
Ahmed Al Doseri	Individual	189	890	40	30-34	735	39	3:51.740	1020	61	119.09/250	816	51	13:15.38	1180	14	4641	47
Saleh Farhan	Individual	182	736	62	36-28	847	18	3:40.470	1112	51	105.21/270	824	50	13:48.65	1081	27	4641	47
Abdul Rahman Khalid	Individual	198	1088	1	25-39	650	56	3:43.040	1088	57	168.65/340	628	59	13:59.74	1048	37	4502	52
Ahmed Al Doseri; Saleh Farhan; Abdul Rahman Khalid	Team		2714	11		2232	14		3220	18		2268	15		3309	8	13743	15

== Taekwondo ==
Men

Athlete	Event	Round of 16	Quarterfinals	Semifinals	Repechage Quarterfinals	Repechage Semifinals	Final
Athlete	Event	Opposition Result	Opposition Result	Opposition Result	Opposition Result	Opposition Result	Opposition Result
Waleed Al Hashash	Middleweight	Na Im Hasan (USA); L PTS	Did not advance				
Rashed Badow	Heavyweight	Hendrik Meyer (NED); L PTS	Did not advance				
Anwar Mohamed	Featherweight	Fayez Aldaihani (KUW); L PTS	Did not advance				
