= Andy Jung =

Andy Jung may refer to:

- Andy Jung (pentathlete) (born 1961), Swiss pentathlete who competed at the 1984 and 1988 Summer Olympics
- Andy Jung (speed skater) (born 1997), Australian short track speed skater who competed at the 2018 Winter Olympics
