= Tadafumi =

- Gender: Male

Origin
- Origin: Japanese
- Meaning: Different meanings depending on the kanji used

Tadafumi (written: 忠文) is a masculine Japanese given name. Notable people with the name include:

- Tadafumi Miwa (三輪 忠文; born 1961), Japanese modern pentathlete
- Torii Tadafumi (鳥居 忠文; 1847–1914), Japanese samurai and politician
