= Rehbein =

Rehbein is a surname of German origin. Notable people with the surname include:

- Bjoern Rehbein, German-American hairstylist and make-up artist
- Clemens Rehbein (born 1992), German musician
- Dick Rehbein (1955–2001), American football coach
- Dirk Rehbein (born 1967), German footballer
- Herbert Rehbein (1922–1979), German songwriter, composer and arranger of light orchestral music
- Karin Rehbein (born 1949), German dressage rider
- Michael Rehbein (born 1960), German modern pentathlete
