= Anwar Mohamed (taekwondo) =

Bahraini taekwondo practitioner

Personal information
- Nationality: Bahraini
- Born: 1965 (age 60–61)

Sport
- Sport: Taekwondo
- Event: Men's featherweight

Anwar Mohamed (Arabic: أنور•محمد, born 1965) is a Bahraini taekwondo practitioner. He competed in the men's featherweight event for Bahrain at the 1988 Summer Olympics.
