= Eduard Zenovka =

Soviet modern pentathlete

Personal information
- Born: 26 April 1969 (age 57)

Sport
- Sport: Modern pentathlon
Medal record
Men's modern pentathlon
Olympic Games
Representing Unified Team
Silver medal – second place	1992 Barcelona	Team
Bronze medal – third place	1992 Barcelona	Individual
Representing Russia
Silver medal – second place	1996 Atlanta	Individual

Eduard Grigoryevich Zenovka (Russian: Эдуард Григорьевич Зеновка; born 26 April 1969) is a former Olympic modern pentathlete.

== Career ==
He competed at the 1992 Olympics as part of the unified team and won a silver medal in the team event and a bronze medal in the individual event. He represented Russia at the 1996 Olympics where he won a silver medal in the individual event.

== Personal life ==
He is married to Russian Choreographer in Russian National team for rhythmic gymnastics, Irina Zenovka. He was previously engaged to rhythmic gymnast World Champion Oxana Kostina, who died from injuries sustained in a car crash. The police investigation revealed that Zenovka, who was driving the car, was heavily intoxicated at the time of the accident.
