= Modern pentathlon at the 1984 Summer Olympics =

Men's modern pentathlon at the Games of the XXIII Olympiad
- Venue: Coto Equestrian Center
- Dates: July 29 - August 1, 1984
- Competitors: 52 from 18 nations

The modern pentathlon at the 1984 Summer Olympics was represented by two events: Individual competition and Team competition. As usual in Olympic modern pentathlon, one competition was held and each competitor's score was included to the Individual competition event results table and was also added to his teammates' scores to be included to the Team competition event results table. This competition consisted of 5 disciplines:

- Equestrian, held on July 29.
- Fencing, held on July 30.
- Swimming, held on July 31.
- Shooting, held on August 1.
- Cross-country, also held on August 1.

The four out of the five events took place at the Coto Equestrian Center in Coto de Caza, California, while the swimming portion was held at the William Woollett Jr. Aquatics Center in nearby Irvine, California.

== Participating nations ==
A total of 52 athletes from 18 nations competed at the Los Angeles Games:

- Australia (3)
- Austria (3)
- Bahrain (3)
- Chinese Taipei (1)
- Egypt (3)
- Finland (3)
- France (3)
- Great Britain (3)
- Italy (3)
- Japan (3)
- Mexico (3)
- Portugal (3)
- South Korea (3)
- Spain (3)
- Sweden (3)
- Switzerland (3)
- United States (3)
- West Germany (3)

== Medal summary ==
Games	Gold	Silver	Bronze
Individual	Daniele Masala; Italy	Svante Rasmuson; Sweden	Carlo Massullo; Italy
Team	Italy; Daniele Masala; Pier Paolo Cristofori; Carlo Massullo	United States; Michael Storm; Robert Gregory Losey; Dean Glenesk	France; Paul Four; Didier Boube; Joël Bouzou

== Medal table ==
Rank	Nation	Gold	Silver	Bronze	Total
1	Italy	2	0	1	3
2	Sweden	0	1	0	1
2	United States	0	1	0	1
4	France	0	0	1	1
Totals (4 entries)		2	2	2	6

== See also ==
- Modern pentathlon at the Friendship Games
