= Christian Sandow =

German modern pentathlete (born 1959)

Personal information
- Born: 7 February 1959 (age 67) Berlin, Germany

Sport
- Sport: Modern pentathlon

Christian Sandow (born 7 February 1959) is a German modern pentathlete. He competed for West Germany at the 1984 Summer Olympics.
