= Martin Lamprecht =

Swedish modern pentathlete

Personal information
- Born: 31 May 1963 (age 63) Stockholm, Sweden

Sport
- Sport: Modern pentathlon

Martin Lamprecht (born 31 May 1963) is a Swedish modern pentathlete. He competed at the 1984 Summer Olympics.
