= Marian Gheorghe =

Romanian modern pentathlete

Personal information
- Born: 15 April 1963 (age 63)

Sport
- Sport: Modern pentathlon

Marian Gheorghe (born 15 April 1963) is a Romanian modern pentathlete. He competed at the 1992 Summer Olympics.
