= James Haley (pentathlete) =

American modern pentathlete

Personal information
- Born: James W. Haley; January 28, 1969 (age 57) Jacksonville, Florida, U.S.
- Education: University of North Florida; Northwestern Health Sciences University
- Spouse: Henrietta Ónodi (m. 1993)
- Children: 3

Sport
- Country: United States
- Sport: Modern pentathlon
- Rank: No. 4 (1992)

Achievements and titles
- Personal best: Modern pentathlon: 5397 pts (1992)

James W. Haley (born January 28, 1969) is an American modern pentathlete.

== Life and career ==
Haley was born in Jacksonville, Florida. He attended the University of North Florida, earning his bachelor of science degree in biology. He also attended Northwestern Health Sciences University, earning his degree in chiropractic medicine.

Haley competed at the 1992 Summer Olympics, competing in two events in modern pentathlon.
