= Gerardo Cortes Sr. =

Chilean modern pentathlete

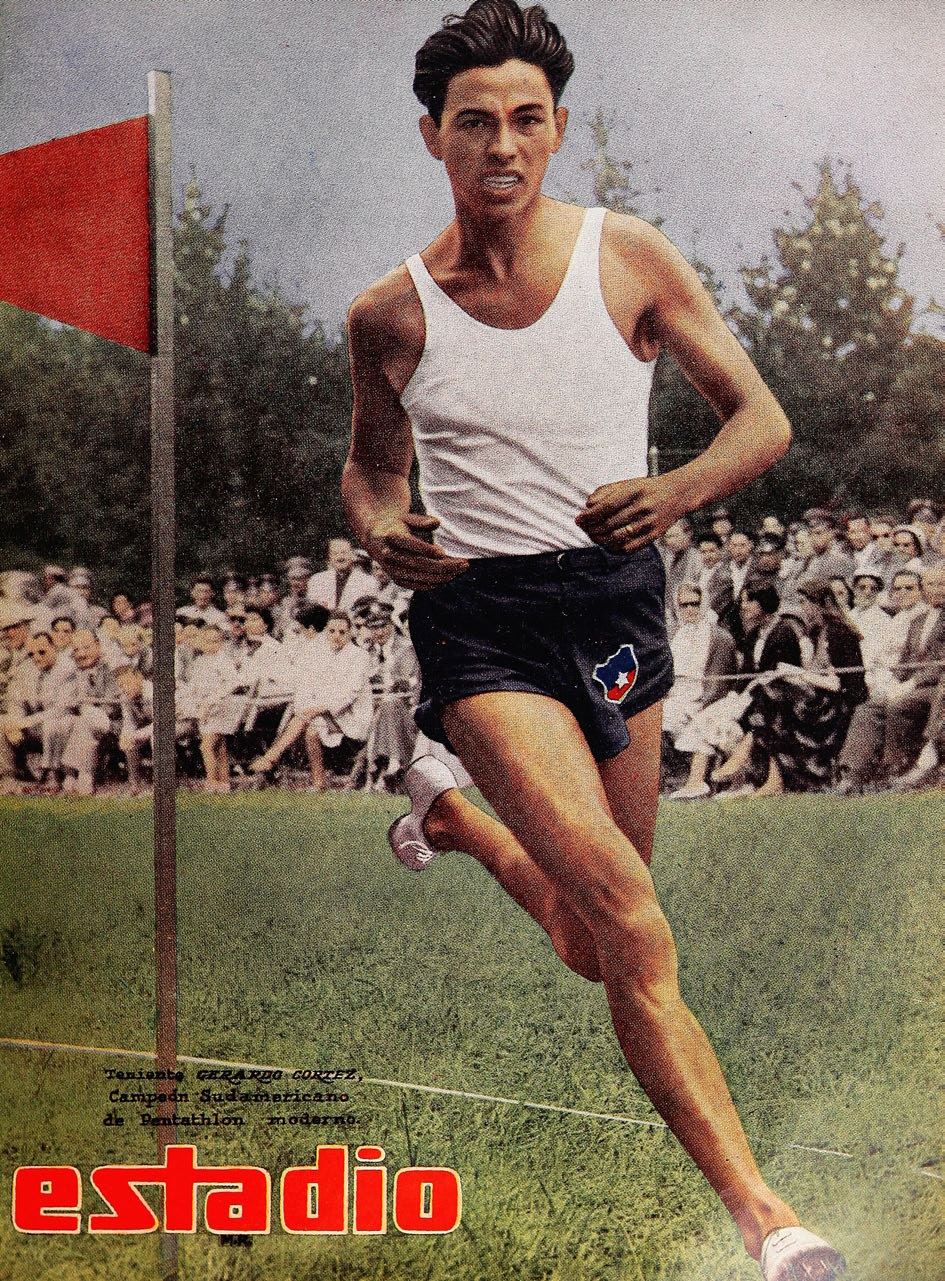

Personal information
- Born: 27 June 1928
- Died: 10 June 1983 (aged 54)

Sport
- Sport: Modern pentathlon

Gerardo Cortes Rencoret Sr. (27 June 1928 – 10 June 1983) was a Chilean modern pentathlete. He competed at the 1956 Summer Olympics. His son, Gerardo Cortes Jr., competed in the pentathlon at the 1988 Summer Olympics.
