= Håkan Norebrink =

Swedish modern pentathlete

Personal information
- Born: 21 February 1965 (age 61) Linköping, Sweden

Sport
- Sport: Modern pentathlon

Håkan Norebrink (born 21 February 1965) is a Swedish modern pentathlete. He competed at the 1992 Summer Olympics, competing in both the team and individual events. The Swedish team placed eighth, and Norebrink finished sixth in the individual competition.
