= Per-Olov Danielsson =

Swedish modern pentathlete

Personal information
- Born: 31 October 1968 (age 57) Falkenberg, Sweden

Sport
- Sport: Modern pentathlon

Per-Olov Danielsson (born 31 October 1968) is a Swedish modern pentathlete. He competed at the 1992 and 1996 Summer Olympics.
