= Vakhtang Iagorashvili =

Soviet modern pentathlete

Personal information
- Nickname: Vaho
- Nationality: Soviet Union; Georgia; United States
- Born: 5 April 1964 (age 62) Tbilisi, Georgian SSR, Soviet Union
- Height: 1.85 m (6 ft 1 in)
- Weight: 83 kg (183 lb)

Sport
- Sport: Modern pentathlon
Medal record
Men's modern pentathlon
Representing Soviet Union
Olympic Games
Bronze medal – third place	1988 Seoul	Individual
Representing United States
Pan American Games
Gold medal – first place	2003 Santo Domingo	Individual

Vakhtang "Vaho" Iagorashvili (born April 5, 1964 in Tbilisi, Georgia) is a Soviet modern pentathlete, who has been a member of three different Olympic teams during his sporting career.

Iagorashvili emerged as the top favorite to win the men's individual and team modern pentathlon in the late 1980s. As a competitor for the Soviet Union, he had won the bronze medal at the 1988 Summer Olympics in Seoul, and gold at the 1990 Goodwill Games in Seattle, became a three-time national champion for the team, and claimed multiple titles at the world championships. He also won three European titles (two golds and one bronze for the individual and team events). After the fall of the Soviet Union in 1991, Iagorashvili retired from his sport, and emigrated to the United States to work as a physical education instructor at the Austin Community College in Austin, Texas.

Iagorashvili eventually came out of retirement in 1995, and qualify for the men's modern pentathlon at the 1996 Summer Olympics in Atlanta, representing his birth nation Georgia. Vaho gained his U.S. citizenship in 2002 making him eligible to compete at the 2004 Summer Olympics in Athens. Between 1999 and 2004, Iagorashvili was appointed to be the coach of the U.S. Olympic Pentathlon Team.

Iagorashvili finally represented the United States at the 2004 Summer Olympics in Athens, after receiving an automatic qualifying place from the 2003 Pan American Games in Santo Domingo, where he won the gold medal. At the Olympics, he bettered his performance in the men's modern pentathlon event, finishing in ninth place with a score of 5,276 points.

Iagorashvili received a master's degree in physical education from Georgia Institute of Physical Cultures and Sport in Tbilisi, in 1985.

Iagorashvili was coaching both men's and women's fencing teams at Penn State University in University Park, Pennsylvania. Now he is head coach of the USA residential pentathlon program in Charlotte North Carolina. He was married to American modern pentathlete, Mary Beth Iagorashvili.
