= János Martinek =

Hungarian modern pentathlete

Personal information
- Born: 23 May 1965 (age 61) Budapest, Hungary

Sport
- Sport: Modern pentathlon
Medal record
Men's modern pentathlon
Representing Hungary
Olympic Games
Gold medal – first place	1988 Seoul	Individual
Gold medal – first place	1988 Seoul	Team
Bronze medal – third place	1996 Atlanta	Individual
World Championships
Gold medal – first place	1987 Moulins	Team
Gold medal – first place	1989 Budapest	Team
Gold medal – first place	1994 Sheffield	Team relay
Bronze medal – third place	1994 Sheffield	Individual

János Martinek (born 23 May 1965) is a Hungarian modern pentathlete and Olympic champion.

== Olympics ==
Martinek participated on the Hungarian team which won the gold medal at the 1988 Summer Olympics in Seoul, and where he also won an individual gold medal. He won a bronze medal at the 1996 Summer Olympics in Atlanta.
