= Li King-Ho =

Taiwanese modern pentathlete

Personal information
- Born: 李 金和, Pinyin: Lǐ Jīn-hé; 21 August 1960 (age 65)

Sport
- Sport: Modern pentathlon

Li King-Ho (born 21 August 1960) is a Taiwanese modern pentathlete. He competed at the 1988 Summer Olympics.
