= Vladimiras Močialovas =

Lithuanian modern pentathlete (born 1968)

Personal information
- Born: 11 April 1968 (age 58) Vilnius, Lithuanian SSR, Soviet Union

Sport
- Sport: Modern pentathlon

Vladimiras Močialovas (born 11 April 1968) is a Lithuanian modern pentathlete. He competed at the 1992 Summer Olympics.
