= Gavin Lackey =

Australian modern pentathlete

Personal information
- Born: 27 July 1968 (age 57)

Sport
- Sport: Modern pentathlon

Gavin Lackey (born 27 July 1968) is an Australian modern pentathlete. He competed at the 1992 Summer Olympics.
