= Michael Rehbein =

German modern pentathlete

Personal information
- Born: 2 June 1960 (age 66) Berlin, Germany

Sport
- Sport: Modern pentathlon

Michael Rehbein (born 2 June 1960) is a German modern pentathlete. He competed for West Germany at the 1984 Summer Olympics.
