= Per Nyqvist =

Swedish modern pentathlete

Personal information
- Born: 21 May 1964 (age 62) Gothenburg, Sweden

Sport
- Sport: Modern pentathlon

Per Nyqvist (born 21 May 1964) is a Swedish modern pentathlete. He competed at the 1992 Summer Olympics.
