= Dariusz Goździak =

Polish modern pentathlete

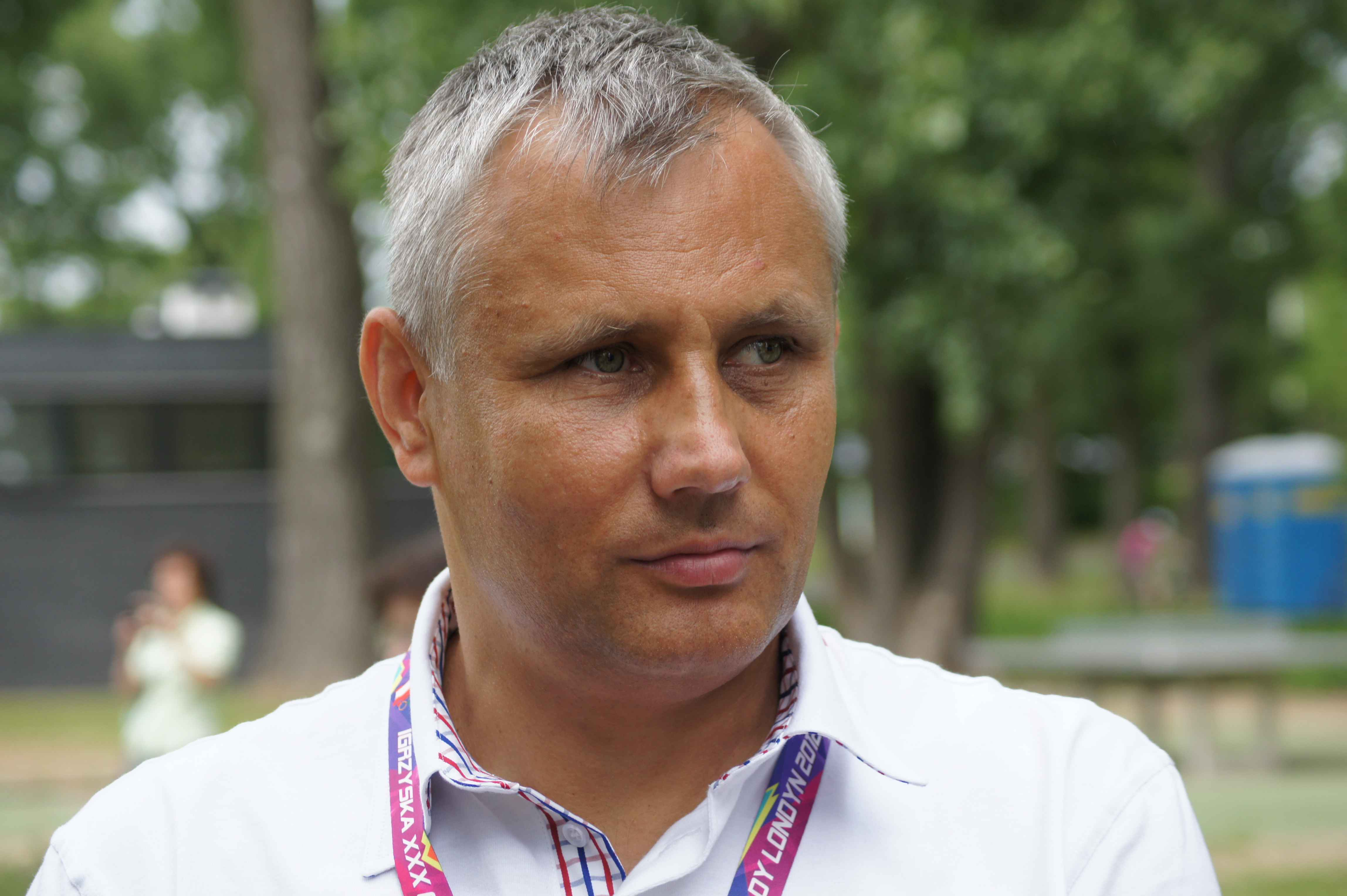
- Dariusz Goździak

Personal information
- Born: 6 December 1962 (age 63) Sulęcin, Polish People’s Republic

Sport
- Sport: Modern pentathlon
Medal record
Men's modern pentathlon
Representing Poland
Olympic Games
Gold medal – first place	1992 Barcelona	Team

Dariusz Goździak (born 6 December 1962) is a Polish former modern pentathlete. He competed at the 1992 Summer Olympics winning a gold medal in the team event.
