= Petr Blažek =

Czech modern pentathlete

Personal information
- Born: 30 March 1961 (age 65) Prague, Czechoslovakia

Sport
- Sport: Modern pentathlon

Petr Blažek (born 30 March 1961) is a Czech modern pentathlete. He competed at the 1992 Summer Olympics.
