= Helmut Spannagl =

Austrian modern pentathlete

Personal information
- Born: 12 January 1962 (age 64)

Sport
- Sport: Modern pentathlon

Helmut Spannagl (born 12 January 1962) is an Austrian modern pentathlete. He competed at the 1988 Summer Olympics.
