= Staņislavs Dobrotvorskis =

Latvian modern pentathlete (born 1961)

Personal information
- Born: 6 September 1961 (age 64) Dushanbe, Tajik SSR, Soviet Union

Sport
- Sport: Modern pentathlon

Staņislavs Dobrotvorskis (born 6 September 1961) is a Latvian modern pentathlete. He competed at the 1992 Summer Olympics.
