= Kirils Medjancevs =

Latvian modern pentathlete (born 1970)

Personal information
- Born: 21 November 1970 (age 54) Riga, Latvia

Sport
- Sport: Modern pentathlon

Kirils Medjancevs (born 21 November 1970) is a Latvian modern pentathlete. He competed at the 1992 Summer Olympics.
