= Tue Hellstem =

Danish modern pentathlete

Personal information
- Born: 10 February 1961 (age 65) Helsingør, Denmark

Sport
- Sport: Modern pentathlon

Tue Hellstem (born 10 February 1961) is a Danish modern pentathlete. He competed at the 1988 Summer Olympics.
