= Ulrich Czermak =

German modern pentathlete

Personal information
- Born: 5 September 1967 (age 58) Marktredwitz, West Germany

Sport
- Sport: Modern pentathlon

Ulrich Czermak (born 5 September 1967) is a German modern pentathlete. He competed at the 1992 Summer Olympics.
