= Pierpaolo Cristofori =

Italian modern pentathlete (born 1956)

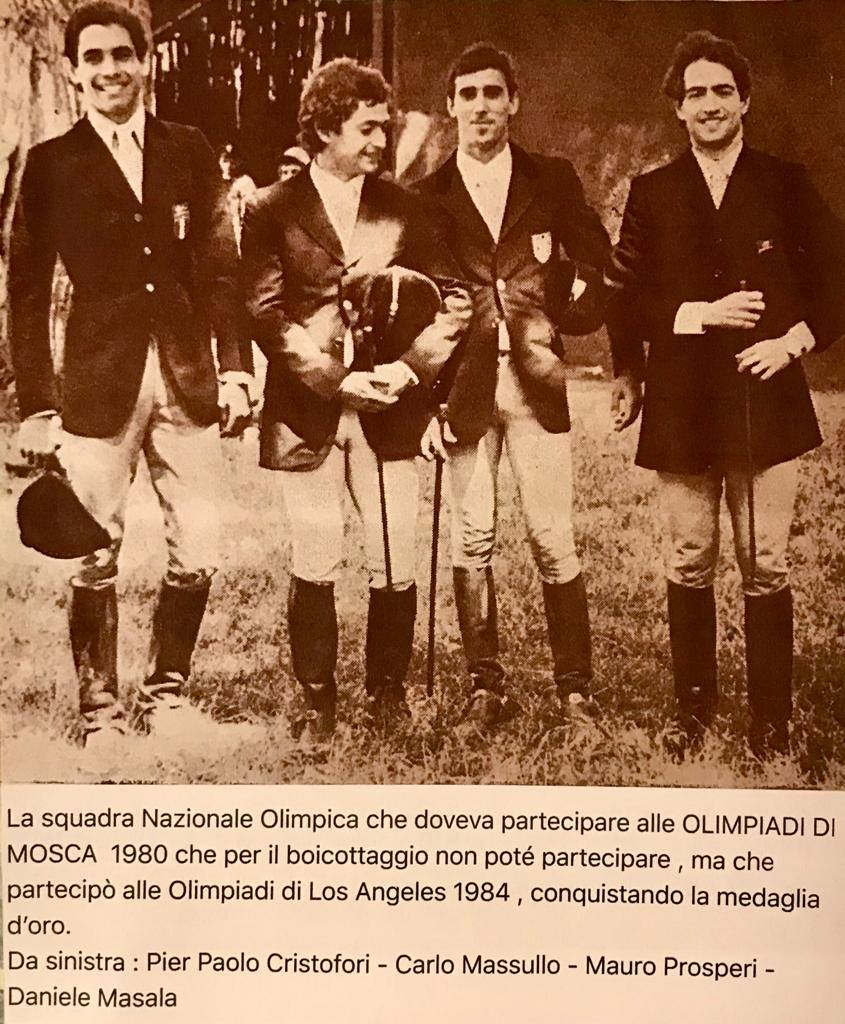
- From left to right Pierpaolo Cristofori, Carlo Massullo, Mauro Prosperi and Daniele Masala

Personal information
- Born: 4 January 1956 (age 70) Rome, Italy

Sport
- Sport: Modern pentathlon
Medal record
Men's modern pentathlon
Representing Italy
Olympic Games
Gold medal – first place	1984 Los Angeles	Team

Pierpaolo Cristofori (born 4 January 1956) is an Italian former modern pentathlete who competed in the 1976 Summer Olympics, in the 1980 Summer Olympics, and in the 1984 Summer Olympics. In 1984, he won a gold medal in the team event.
