= Gintaras Staškevičius =

Lithuanian modern pentathlete (born 1964)

Personal information
- Born: 26 February 1964 (age 62) Vilnius, Lithuanian SSR, Soviet Union

Sport
- Sport: Modern pentathlon

Gintaras Staškevičius (born 26 February 1964) is a Lithuanian modern pentathlete. He competed at the 1992 Summer Olympics.
