= Vjačeslavs Duhanovs =

Latvian modern pentathlete (born 1973)

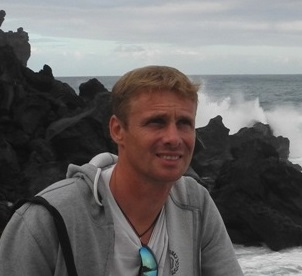

Personal information
- Born: 5 June 1973 (age 53) Riga, Latvia

Sport
- Sport: Modern pentathlon

Vjačeslavs Duhanovs (born 5 June 1973) is a Latvian modern pentathlete. He competed at the 1992 and 1996 Summer Olympics.
