= Lee Yeong-chan =

South Korean modern pentathlete

Personal information
- Born: 8 February 1970 (age 56)

Sport
- Sport: Modern pentathlon

Lee Yeong-chan (born 8 February 1970) is a South Korean modern pentathlete. He competed at the 1992 Summer Olympics.
