= Iván Ortega =

Mexican modern pentathlete (born 1971)

Personal information
- Born: 22 July 1971 (age 54)

Sport
- Sport: Modern pentathlon

Iván Ortega (born 22 July 1971) is a Mexican modern pentathlete. He competed at the 1992 Summer Olympics.
