= Chuang Tang-Fa =

Taiwanese modern pentathlete

Personal information
- Full name: 莊 堂發, Pinyin: Zhuāng Táng-fā

Sport
- Sport: Modern pentathlon

Chuang Tang-Fa is a Taiwanese modern pentathlete. He competed at the 1988 Summer Olympics.
