= Modern pentathlon at the 1992 Summer Olympics =

Men's modern pentathlon at the Games of the XXV Olympiad
- Dates: July 26–29, 1992
- Competitors: 66 from 30 nations

The modern pentathlon at the 1992 Summer Olympics was represented by two events (both for men): Individual competition and Team competition. As usual in Olympic modern pentathlon, one competition was held and each competitor's score was included to the Individual competition event results table and was also added to his teammates' scores to be included to the Team competition event results table. This competition consisted of 5 disciplines:

- Fencing, held on July 26 at the Palau de la Metal-lúrgia
- Swimming, held on July 27 at the Piscines Bernat Picornell
- Shooting, held on July 27 at the Camp de Tir Olímpic de Mollet
- Running, held on July 28 at Circuit de Cros
- Equestrian held on July 29 at the Real Club de Polo

== Participating nations ==
A total of 66 athletes from 30 nations competed at the Barcelona Games:

- Australia (3)
- Bulgaria (2)
- Canada (3)
- China (1)
- Czechoslovakia (3)
- Egypt (3)
- Estonia (1)
- France (3)
- Germany (3)
- Great Britain (3)
- Greece (1)
- Guatemala (1)
- Hungary (3)
- Italy (3)
- Japan (1)
- Latvia (3)
- Lithuania (3)
- Mexico (3)
- Peru (1)
- Poland (3)
- Portugal (1)
- Romania (1)
- South Africa (1)
- South Korea (3)
- Spain (3)
- Sweden (3)
- Switzerland (1)
- Unified Team (3)
- United States (3)
- Uruguay (1)

== Medal summary ==
Event	Gold	Silver	Bronze
Individual	Arkadiusz Skrzypaszek; Poland	Attila Mizsér; Hungary	Eduard Zenovka; Unified Team (Russia)
Team	Poland; Arkadiusz Skrzypaszek; Dariusz Goździak; Maciej Czyżowicz	Unified Team; Anatoli Starostin; Dmitri Svatkovskiy; Eduard Zenovka	Italy; Gianluca Tiberti; Carlo Massullo; Roberto Bomprezzi

== Medal table ==
Rank	Nation	Gold	Silver	Bronze	Total
1	Poland	2	0	0	2
2	Unified Team	0	1	1	2
3	Hungary	0	1	0	1
4	Italy	0	0	1	1
Totals (4 entries)		2	2	2	6
