= Nabeel Saleh Mubarak =

Bahraini modern pentathlete

Sport
- Sport: Modern pentathlon

Nabeel Saleh Mubarak is a Bahraini modern pentathlete. He competed at the 1984 Summer Olympics, finishing in 41st place in the individual event.
