= Roberto Bomprezzi =

Italian modern pentathlete (born 1962)

Personal information
- Born: 9 October 1962 (age 63) Rome, Italy

Sport
- Sport: Modern pentathlon
- Club: G.S. Fiamme Azzurre
Medal record
Men's modern pentathlon
Representing Italy
Olympic Games
Bronze medal – third place	1992 Barcelona	Team

Roberto Bomprezzi (born 9 October 1962) is an Italian former modern pentathlete. He competed at the 1992 Summer Olympics, winning a bronze medal in the team event. He is currently a physician in good standing at the University of Massachusetts medical center practicing neurology with a focus in multiple sclerosis.

Bomprezzi was an athlete of Gruppo Sportivo Fiamme Azzurre.
