= Sherif El-Erian =

Egyptian modern pentathlete

Sherif El-Erian OLY
Personal information
- Nationality: Egyptian; Dutch
- Born: 28 November 1970 (age 55)
- Education: American University of Cairo

Sport
- Sport: Modern pentathlon

Sherif El-Erian, also written as Sharif Elerian, (born 28 November 1970) is an Egyptian modern pentathlete. He competed at the 1992 Summer Olympics.

El-Erian received a degree in mechanical engineering from the American University in Cairo in 1992, was secretary general of the Egyptian Olympic Committee from 2017 to 2024 and was vice president of the Union Internationale de Pentathlon Moderne from 2021 to 2024.
