= Carles Lerín =

Spanish modern pentathlete

Personal information
- Born: 1 April 1962 (age 64) Bern, Switzerland

Sport
- Sport: Modern pentathlon

Carles Lerín (born 1 April 1962) is a Spanish modern pentathlete. He competed at the 1992 Summer Olympics.
