= Alberto Félix (pentathlete) =

Mexican modern pentathlete (born 1969)

Personal information
- Born: 16 July 1969 (age 56)

Sport
- Sport: Modern pentathlon

Alberto Félix (born 16 July 1969) is a Mexican modern pentathlete. He competed at the 1992 Summer Olympics.
