= Anatoly Avdeyev =

Soviet modern pentathlete (born 1960)

Personal information
- Born: 18 October 1960 (age 65)
- Height: 170 cm (5 ft 7 in)
- Weight: 76 kg (168 lb)

Sport
- Sport: Modern pentathlon

Anatoly Avdeyev (Анатолий Авдеев, born 18 October 1960) is a Soviet modern pentathlete. He competed at the 1988 Summer Olympics.
