= Marcus Marsollek =

German modern pentathlete

Personal information
- Born: 7 August 1965 (age 60) Berlin, Germany

Sport
- Sport: Modern pentathlon

Marcus Marsollek (born 7 August 1965) is a German modern pentathlete. He competed for West Germany at the 1988 Summer Olympics.
