= Ayman Mahmoud =

Egyptian modern pentathlete

Ayman Mahmoud OLY
Personal information
- Native name: ايمن محمود
- Born: 1 March 1967 (age 59)

Sport
- Sport: Modern pentathlon

Ayman Mahmoud (Egyptian Arabic: ايمن محمود, born 1 March 1967) is an Egyptian modern pentathlete. He competed at the 1988 Summer Olympics.
