= Bruno Génard =

French modern pentathlete

Personal information
- Born: 22 February 1961 (age 65) Villeneuve-Saint-Georges, France

Sport
- Sport: Modern pentathlon

Bruno Génard (born 22 February 1961) is a French modern pentathlete. He competed at the 1988 Summer Olympics, held in Seoul, South Korea.
