= Hiroaki Izumikawa =

Japanese modern pentathlete (born 1957)

Personal information
- Born: 20 December 1957 (age 68)

Sport
- Sport: Modern pentathlon

Hiroaki Izumikawa (泉川 寛晃, Izumikawa Hiroaki) (born 20 December 1957) is a Japanese modern pentathlete. He competed at the 1988 Summer Olympics.
