= Kim Seong-ho =

South Korean modern pentathlete

Personal information
- Born: 3 December 1964 (age 61)

Sport
- Sport: Modern pentathlon

Kim Seong-ho (born 3 December 1964) is a South Korean modern pentathlete. He competed at the 1988 Summer Olympics.
