= Wiesław Chmielewski =

Polish modern pentathlete (born 1957)

Personal information
- Born: 14 February 1957 (age 69) Międzyzdroje, Poland

Sport
- Sport: Modern pentathlon

Wiesław Chmielewski (born 14 February 1957) is a Polish modern pentathlete. He competed at the 1988 Summer Olympics.
