= Hiroshi Saito (pentathlete) =

Japanese modern pentathlete

Personal information
- Born: 4 September 1961 (age 64)

Sport
- Sport: Modern pentathlon

Hiroshi Saito (才藤 浩, Saitō Hiroshi; born 4 September 1961) is a Japanese former modern pentathlete. He competed at the 1988 Summer Olympics.
