= Lawrence Keyte =

Canadian modern pentathlete (born 1963)

Personal information
- Born: 11 September 1963 (age 63) Boston, Massachusetts, United States

Sport
- Sport: Modern pentathlon

Lawrence Keyte (born 11 September 1963) is a Canadian modern pentathlete. He competed at the 1988 Summer Olympics.
