= Jan-Erik Danielsson =

Swedish modern pentathlete

Personal information
- Born: 10 February 1960 (age 66) Söderhamn, Sweden

Sport
- Sport: Modern pentathlon

Jan-Erik Danielsson (born 10 February 1960) is a Swedish modern pentathlete. He competed at the 1988 Summer Olympics.
