= Nicholas Fekete =

Canadian modern pentathlete (born 1962)

Personal information
- Born: August 5, 1962 (age 63) Montreal, Quebec, Canada

Sport
- Sport: Modern pentathlon

Nicholas Fekete (born August 5, 1962) is a Canadian modern pentathlete. He competed at the 1988 Summer Olympics.
