= German Yuferov =

Soviet modern pentathlete

Personal information
- Born: 2 June 1963 (age 63)

Sport
- Sport: Modern pentathlon

German Yuferov (born 2 June 1963) is a Soviet modern pentathlete. He competed at the 1988 Summer Olympics.
