= Peter Burger =

Swiss modern pentathlete

Personal information
- Born: 23 October 1954 (age 71)

Sport
- Sport: Modern pentathlon

Peter Burger (born 23 October 1954) was a Swiss modern pentathlete. He competed at the 1988 Summer Olympics.
