= Michael Zimmermann =

German modern pentathlete

Personal information
- Born: 31 July 1959 (age 66) Opladen, West Germany
- Height: 1.74 m (5 ft 9 in)
- Weight: 64 kg (141 lb)

Sport
- Sport: Modern pentathlon

Michael Zimmermann (born 31 July 1959) is a German modern pentathlete. He competed for West Germany at the 1988 Summer Olympics.
