= Zhang Bin (pentathlete) =

Chinese modern pentathlete

Personal information
- Born: 張 斌, Pinyin: Zhāng Bīn; 22 September 1969 (age 56)

Sport
- Sport: Modern pentathlon

Zhang Bin (born 22 September 1969) is a Chinese modern pentathlete. He competed at the 1988 and 1992 Summer Olympics.
