= Eduardo Quesada =

Spanish modern pentathlete

Personal information
- Born: 11 October 1963 (age 62) Sidi Ifni, Morocco

Sport
- Sport: Modern pentathlon

Eduardo Quesada (born 11 October 1963) is a Spanish modern pentathlete. He competed at the 1988 Summer Olympics.
