= Robert Nieman =

American modern pentathlete (born 1947)

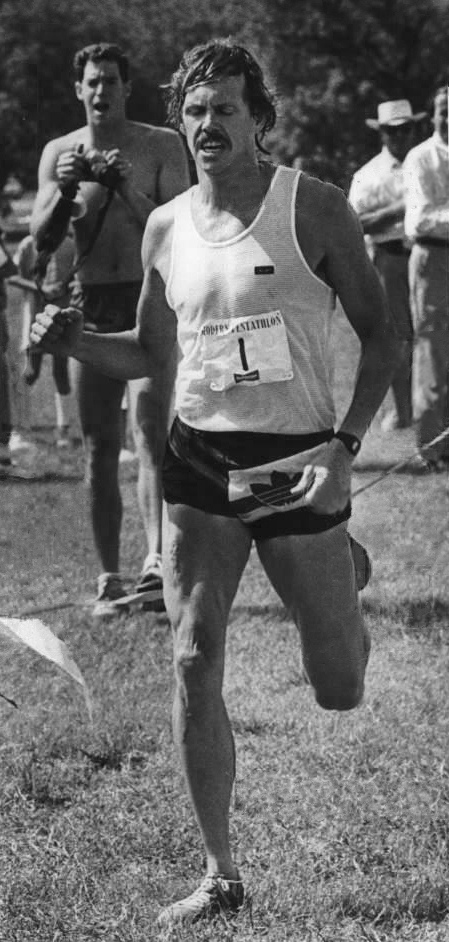
- Nieman in 1988

Personal information
- Born: October 21, 1947 (age 78) Chicago, Illinois, U.S.
- Height: 185 cm (6 ft 1 in)
- Weight: 77 kg (170 lb)

Sport
- Sport: Modern pentathlon
Medal record
Representing USA
Pan American Games
Silver medal – second place	1983 Caracas	Team épée

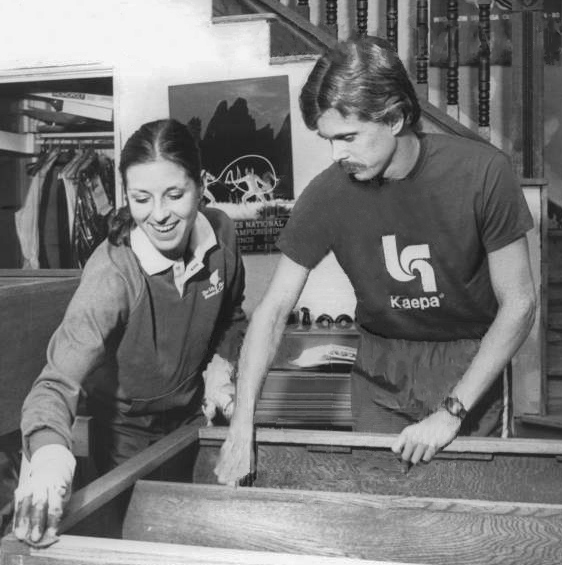
Nieman with wife Susan in 1983

Robert Lee Nieman (born October 21, 1947) is an American modern pentathlete who competed at the 1976 and 1988 Summer Olympics. Nieman won the 1979 World Pentathlon Championship, and remains the only American man to capture a world title. Although Nieman had qualified for the 1980 Olympic team he did not compete due to the Olympic Committee's boycott of the 1980 Summer Olympics in Moscow, Russia. He was one of 461 athletes to receive a Congressional Gold Medal instead. Nieman won a team silver medal in épée fencing event at the 1983 Pan American Games.
