= Manuel Barroso (pentathlete) =

Portuguese modern pentathlete (born 1964)

Personal information
- Born: 9 June 1964 (age 62) Lisbon, Portugal

Sport
- Sport: Modern pentathlon

Manuel Barroso (born 9 June 1964) is a Portuguese modern pentathlete. He competed at the 1984, 1988, 1992 and 1996 Summer Olympics.
