= Ahmed Al-Doseri =

Bahraini modern pentathlete and fencer

Personal information
- Born: 1966 (age 59–60)

Sport
- Sport: Modern pentathlon, fencing

Ahmed Al-Doseri (born 1966) is a Bahraini modern pentathlete and fencer. He competed in the pentathlon and épée events at the 1988 Summer Olympics.
