= Marcelo Hoyo =

Mexican modern pentathlete (born 1962)

Personal information
- Born: 22 April 1962 (age 64)

Sport
- Sport: Modern pentathlon

Marcelo Hoyo (born 22 April 1962) is a Mexican modern pentathlete. He competed at the 1984 and 1988 Summer Olympics.
