= Gang Gyeong-hyo =

South Korean modern pentathlete

Personal information
- Born: 23 November 1964 (age 61)

Sport
- Sport: Modern pentathlon

Korean name
- Hangul: 강경효
- Hanja: 姜炅孝
- RR: Gang Gyeonghyo
- MR: Kang Kyŏnghyo

Gang Gyeong-hyo (born 23 November 1964), also known as Kang Kyung-hyo, is a South Korean modern pentathlete. He competed at the 1984 and 1988 Summer Olympics.
