= Attila Mizsér =

Hungarian modern pentathlete

Personal information
- Born: 28 April 1961 (age 65) Budapest, Hungary

Sport
- Sport: Modern pentathlon
Medal record
Men's modern pentathlon
Representing Hungary
Olympic Games
Men's Olympic Games
Gold medal – first place	1988 Seoul	Team
Silver medal – second place	1992 Barcelona	Individual
World Championships
Gold medal – first place	1985 Melbourne	Individual
Gold medal – first place	1987 Moulins	Team
Gold medal – first place	1989 Budapest	Team
Gold medal – first place	1989 Budapest	Team relay
Gold medal – first place	1993 Darmstadt	Team relay
Silver medal – second place	1982 Rome	Team
Silver medal – second place	1985 Melbourne	Team
Silver medal – second place	1986 Montecatini	Team
Silver medal – second place	1989 Budapest	Individual
Silver medal – second place	1990 Lahti	Team relay
Bronze medal – third place	1991 San Antonio	Team

Attila Mizsér (born 28 April 1961) is a Hungarian modern pentathlete and Olympic champion.

== Olympics ==
Attila Mizsér participated on the Hungarian team which won a gold medal at the 1988 Summer Olympics in Seoul. He won an individual silver medal at the 1992 Summer Olympics in Barcelona.

== Awards ==
Mizsér was elected Hungarian Sportsman of the Year in 1985, and Hungarian Modern Pentathlete of the Year in 1985, 1990 and 1992. The Olympic gold-winning pentathlon team, of which Mizsér was a member, was elected Hungarian Team of the year in 1987, 1988 and 1989. Mizsér also received International Fair Play Award in 1995.

== Personal life ==
Mizsér married Edina Éri in 1991. They have four children: Alexa (born 1992), Melissa (born 1994), Márk (born 2003) and Norina (born 2010).

Awards
Preceded by Tamás Gáspár	Hungarian Sportsman of The Year; 1985	Succeeded by Tamás Darnyi
