= Barry Kennedy =

Canadian modern pentathlete (born 1953)

Personal information
- Born: January 17, 1953 (age 72); Edmonton, Alberta, Canada

Sport
- Sport: Modern pentathlon

Barry Kennedy (born January 17, 1953) is a Canadian modern pentathlete. He competed at the 1988 Summer Olympics.
