= Tadafumi Miwa =

Japanese modern pentathlete

Personal information
- Born: 28 October 1961 (age 64)

Sport
- Sport: Modern pentathlon

Tadafumi Miwa (三輪 忠文, Miwa Tadafumi; born 28 October 1961) is a Japanese modern pentathlete. He competed at the 1988 Summer Olympics.
