= Gianluca Tiberti =

Italian modern pentathlete (born 1967)

Personal information
- Born: 24 April 1967 (age 59) Rome, Italy

Sport
- Sport: Modern pentathlon
Medal record
Men's modern pentathlon
Representing Italy
Olympic Games
Silver medal – second place	1988 Seoul	Team
Bronze medal – third place	1992 Barcelona	Team
World Championships
Gold medal – first place	1990 Lahtil	Individual
Silver medal – second place	1990 Lahtil	Team
Bronze medal – third place	1990 Lahtil	Relay

Gianluca Tiberti (born 24 April 1967) is an Italian former modern pentathlete who competed at the 1988 Summer Olympics and at the 1992 Summer Olympics. He won a silver medal in the team event in 1988 and a bronze in the same event in 1992.
