= Dominic Mahony =

British modern pentathlete

Personal information
- Born: 26 April 1964 (age 62) Plymouth, England

Sport
- Country: England
- Sport: Modern pentathlon
- Event: Modern Pentathlon

Achievements and titles
- Olympic finals: 1988 Seoul
Medal record
Men's modern pentathlon
Representing Great Britain
Olympic Games
Bronze medal – third place	1988 Seoul	Team

Dominic John Grehan Mahony MBE (born 26 April 1964) is a British former modern pentathlete. He competed in the 1988 Summer Olympics and at the 1992 Summer Olympics, winning a bronze medal at the 1988 Games. In 1986, he won the épée title at the British Fencing Championships. Mahony finished 36th at Barcelona in 1992 in the individual event, and 6th in the team event.

Mahony attended Millfield School from 1977 to 1982. He was appointed Member of the Order of the British Empire (MBE) in the 2014 New Year Honours for voluntary services to modern pentathlon.
