= Julio Fuentes (pentathlete) =

Chilean modern pentathlete

Personal information
- Born: 31 December 1960 (age 65)

Sport
- Sport: Modern pentathlon

Julio Fuentes (born 31 December 1960) is a Chilean former modern pentathlete. He competed at the 1988 Summer Olympics.
