= Roderick Martin (athlete) =

Swedish modern pentathlete

Personal information
- Born: 27 April 1959 (age 67) Bogotá, Colombia

Sport
- Sport: Modern pentathlon

Roderick Martin (born 27 April 1959) is a Swedish modern pentathlete. He competed at the 1984 and 1988 Summer Olympics.
