= Milan Kadlec (pentathlete) =

Czech modern pentathlete

Personal information
- Born: 3 December 1958 Kladno, Czechoslovakia
- Died: 24 August 2001 (aged 42) Bělá pod Bezdězem, Czech Republic

Sport
- Sport: Modern pentathlon

Milan Kadlec (3 December 1958 – 24 August 2001) was a Czech modern pentathlete. He competed at the 1980 and 1988 Summer Olympics.
