= Ricardo Falconi =

Chilean modern pentathlete

Personal information
- Born: 21 November 1962 (age 63)

Sport
- Sport: Modern pentathlon

Ricardo Falconi (born 21 November 1962) is a Chilean former modern pentathlete. He competed at the 1988 Summer Olympics.
