= Daniele Masala =

Italian modern pentathlete (born 1955)

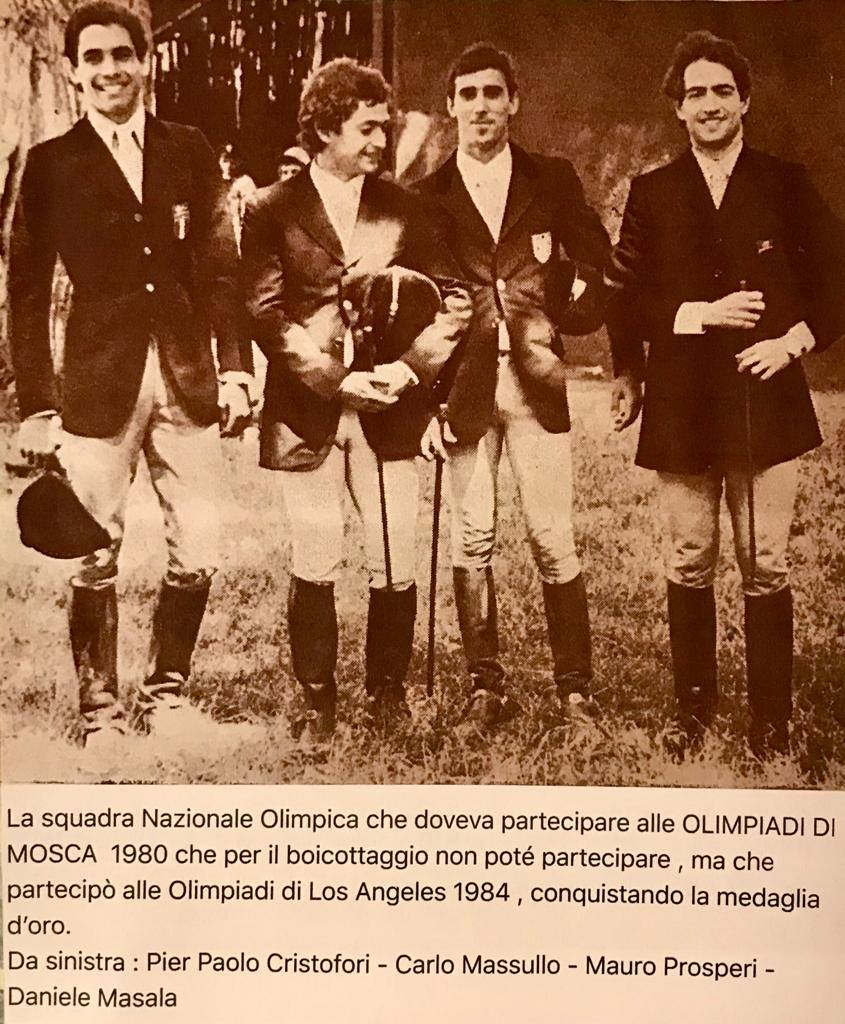
- From left to right Pierpaolo Cristofori, Carlo Massullo, Mauro Prosperi and Daniele Masala

Personal information
- Born: 12 February 1955 (age 71) Rome, Italy

Sport
- Country: Italy
Medal record
Men's modern pentathlon
Representing Italy
Men's Olympic Games
Gold medal – first place	1984 Los Angeles	Individual
Gold medal – first place	1984 Los Angeles	Team
Silver medal – second place	1988 Seoul	Team
World Championships
Gold medal – first place	1982 Rome	Individual
Gold medal – first place	1986 Montecatini	Team
Silver medal – second place	1981 Zielona Góra	Individual
Silver medal – second place	1986 Montecatini	Individual
Bronze medal – third place	1979 Budapest	Individual
Bronze medal – third place	1981 Zielona Góra	Team
Bronze medal – third place	1982 Rome	Team
Bronze medal – third place	1985 Melbourne	Team

Daniele Masala (born 12 February, 1955) is an Italian modern pentathlete and Olympic champion.

== Biography ==
Masala first participated at the Olympics in 1976. Eight years later, he was on the Italian team which won a gold medal at the 1984 Summer Olympics in Los Angeles. He also received the individual gold medal. At the 1988 Summer Olympics in Seoul he earned a team silver medal.
