= Graham Brookhouse =

British modern pentathlete (born 1962)

Personal information
- Born: 19 June 1962 (age 64) Birmingham, England

Sport
- Sport: Modern pentathlon
Medal record
Men's modern pentathlon
Representing United Kingdom
Olympic Games
| Bronze medal – third place | 1988 Seoul | Team |

Graham Raymond Brookhouse (born 19 June 1962) is a former British Olympic modern pentathlete.

== Seoul Olympics ==
Brookhouse competed in the 1988 Summer Olympics in Seoul, South Korea and won a bronze medal in the team event with a total point tally of 15276.

== Barcelona Olympics ==
Brookhouse also competed in the 1992 Summer Olympics held in Barcelona, Spain. He once again competed in the modern pentathlon where he came 8th in the individual event and he also came 6th in the team event. He was one of the oldest competitors in the Modern Pentathlon competition at the age of 30 in 1992.

== Gloucester City Swimming Club ==
Brookhouse was head coach of Gloucester City Swimming Club from 2001 to 2012 and is now a coach at Lydney Swimming Club lives in Cheltenham. He also runs his own swim school in Stroud.
