= Jorge Quesada =

Spanish modern pentathlete

Personal information
- Born: 12 January 1961 (age 65)

Sport
- Sport: Modern pentathlon

Jorge Quesada (born 12 January 1961) is a Spanish modern pentathlete. He competed at the 1984 and 1988 Summer Olympics.

Quesada was disqualified at the 1988 Summer Olympics after he tested positive for propranolol.
