= Abdulrahman Khaled =

Bahraini fencer

Personal information
- Born: 17 January 1966 (age 60)

Sport
- Sport: Modern pentathlon, fencing

Abdulrahman Khaled (born 17 January 1966) is a Bahraini modern pentathlete and fencer. He competed in the pentathlon and épée events at the 1988 Summer Olympics.
