= Svante Rasmuson =

Swedish modern pentathlete and fencer

Personal information
- Full name: Svante Erik Rasmuson
- Born: 18 November 1955 (age 70) Uppsala, Sweden
- Height: 184 cm (6 ft 0 in)
- Weight: 78 kg (172 lb)

Sport
- Sport: Modern pentathlon, swimming
Medal record
Men's modern pentathlon
Representing Sweden
Olympic Games
Silver medal – second place	1984 Los Angeles	Individual
Bronze medal – third place	1980 Moscow	Team

Svante Erik Rasmuson (born 18 November 1955) is a Swedish modern pentathlete and fencer. He won a bronze medal in the modern pentathlon event with his team at the 1980 Summer Olympics and a silver medal at the 1984 Summer Olympics.
