= Jiří Prokopius =

Modern pentathlete

Personal information
- Born: 1 July 1967 (age 59) Strakonice, Czechoslovakia

Sport
- Sport: Modern pentathlon

Jiří Prokopius (born 1 July 1967) is a Czech modern pentathlete. He competed at the 1988 and 1992 Summer Olympics.
