= Tomáš Fleissner =

Czech modern pentathlete

Personal information
- Born: 20 August 1960 (age 65) Plzeň, Czechoslovakia

Sport
- Country: Czechoslovakia
- Sport: Modern pentathlon

Tomáš Fleissner (born 20 August 1960) is a Czech modern pentathlete. He competed for Czechoslovakia at the 1988 and 1992 Summer Olympics.
