= Mohamed Abdou El-Souad =

Egyptian modern pentathlete

Mohamed Abdou El-Souad OLY
Personal information
- Born: 5 November 1968 (age 57)

Sport
- Sport: Modern pentathlon

Mohamed Rjaya Ahmad Abbas Abdou El-Souad (born 5 November 1968) is an Egyptian modern pentathlete. He competed at the 1988 and 1992 Summer Olympics.
