= Richard Phelps (pentathlete) =

British modern pentathlete

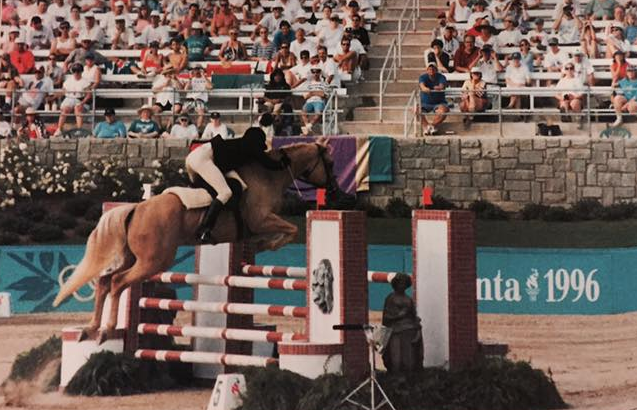
- Richard Phelps riding The Golden Machine at the 1996 Atlanta Olympic Games

Personal information
- Born: 19 April 1961 (age 65) Gloucester, England

Sport
- Sport: Modern pentathlon
Medal record
Men's modern pentathlon
Representing United Kingdom
Olympic Games
Bronze medal – third place	1988 Seoul	Team

Richard Phelps (born 19 April 1961) is a British former modern pentathlete.

== Early life ==
He was from Hempsted. He was a scrap metal merchant. The British team manager in 1988 was Ron Bright.

== Career ==
He competed at the 1984, 1988, 1992 and the 1996 Summer Olympics. He won a bronze medal in the team event at the 1988 Games.
