= Gerardo Cortes Jr. =

Chilean modern pentathlete

Personal information
- Born: 18 February 1959 (age 67)

Sport
- Sport: Modern pentathlon

Gerardo Cortes Jr. (born 18 February 1959) is a Chilean modern pentathlete. He competed at the 1988 Summer Olympics. His father, Gerardo Cortes Sr., competed in the pentathlon at the 1956 Summer Olympics.
