= Arkadiusz Skrzypaszek =

Polish modern pentathlete

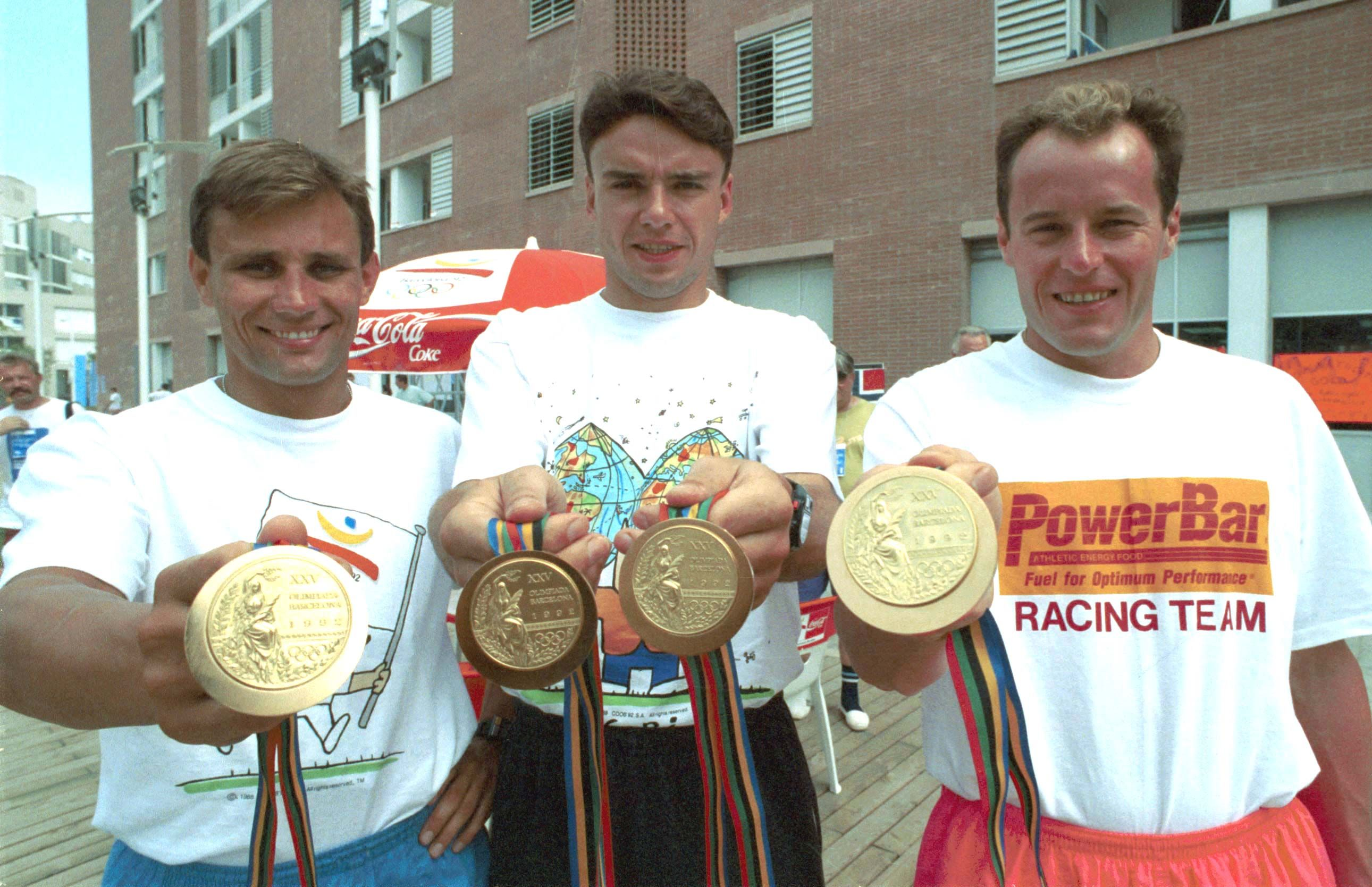
- Skrzypaszek (center) in 1992.

Personal information
- Born: 20 April 1968 (age 58) Oświęcim, Polish People’s Republic

Sport
- Sport: Modern pentathlon
Medal record
Men's modern pentathlon
Representing Poland
Olympic Games
Gold medal – first place	1992 Barcelona	Individual
Gold medal – first place	1992 Barcelona	Team

Arkadiusz Skrzypaszek (born 20 April 1968, Oświęcim) is a Polish modern pentathlete. He won two gold Olympic medals, both in Barcelona, 1992. Skrzypaszek won the individual and the team event. After the Barcelona games he retired.
