= Maciej Czyżowicz =

Polish modern pentathlete (born 1962)

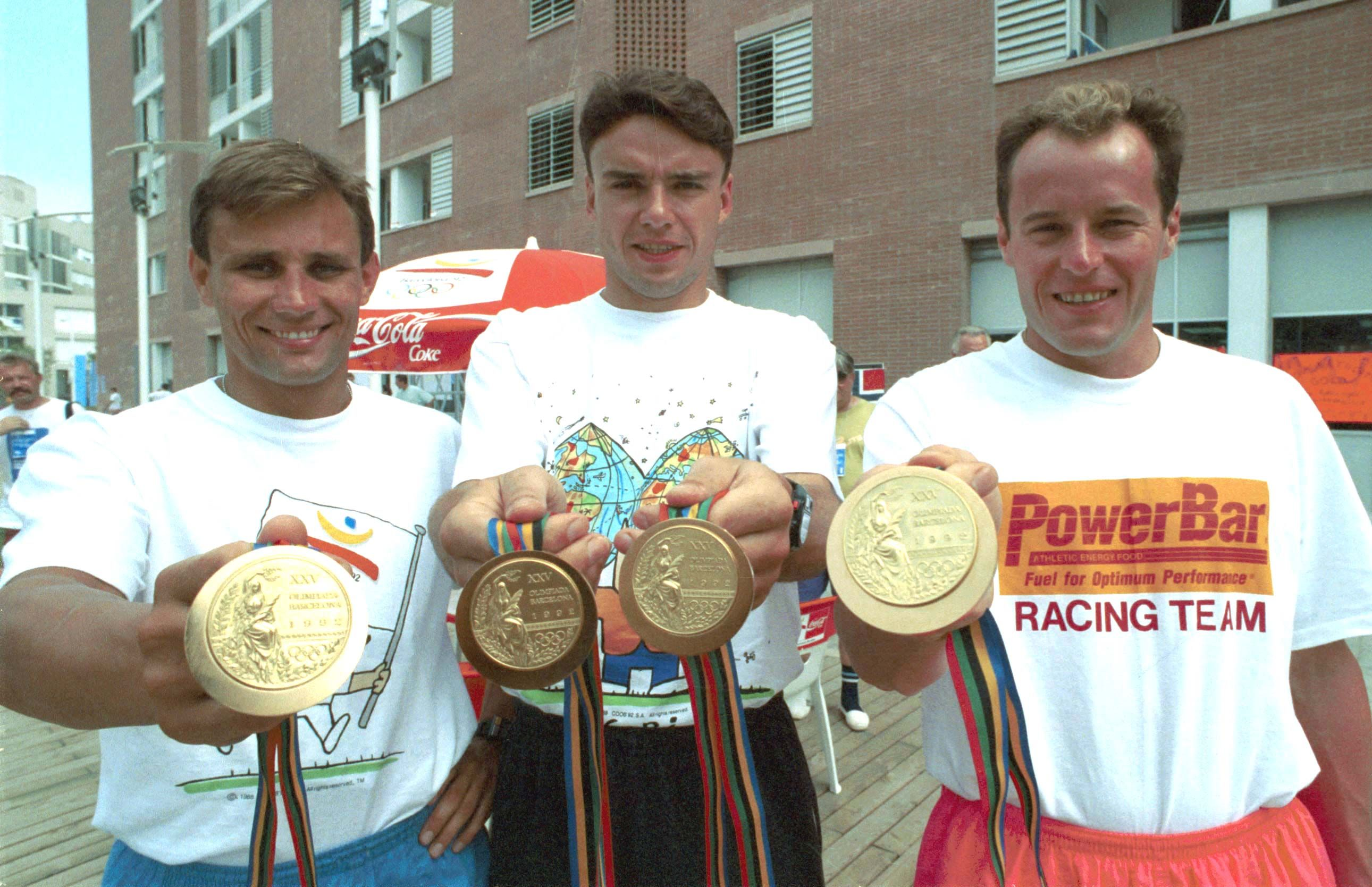
- Czyżowicz (right) in 1992.

Personal information
- Born: 28 January 1962 (age 64) Szczecin, Polish People’s Republic

Sport
- Sport: Modern pentathlon
Medal record
Men's modern pentathlon
Representing Poland
Olympic Games
Gold medal – first place	1992 Barcelona	Team

Maciej Czyżowicz (born 28 January 1962) was a Polish former modern pentathlete. He competed at the 1988 Summer Olympics, at the 1992 Summer Olympics, and at the 1996 Summer Olympics. He won a gold medal in the team event in 1992.
