= Alex Watson (pentathlete) =

Australian modern pentathlete

Personal information
- Born: 24 October 1957 (age 69) Mosman, New South Wales, Australia

Sport
- Sport: Modern pentathlon

Alex Watson (born 24 October 1957) is an Australian modern pentathlete. He was educated at North Sydney Boys High School He competed at the 1984, 1988 and 1992 Summer Olympics.

Watson was disqualified at the 1988 Summer Olympics for excessive levels of caffeine, but later cleared his name and was allowed to compete in the 1992 Barcelona Olympics.
