= Moustafa Adam =

Egyptian modern pentathlete (born 1968)

Moustafa Adam OLY
Personal information
- Born: 31 October 1968 (age 57)

Sport
- Sport: Modern pentathlon

Moustafa Isma'il Moustafa Adam (born 31 October 1968) is an Egyptian modern pentathlete. He competed at the 1988 and 1992 Summer Olympics.
