= Michael Gostigian =

American modern pentathlete (born 1963)

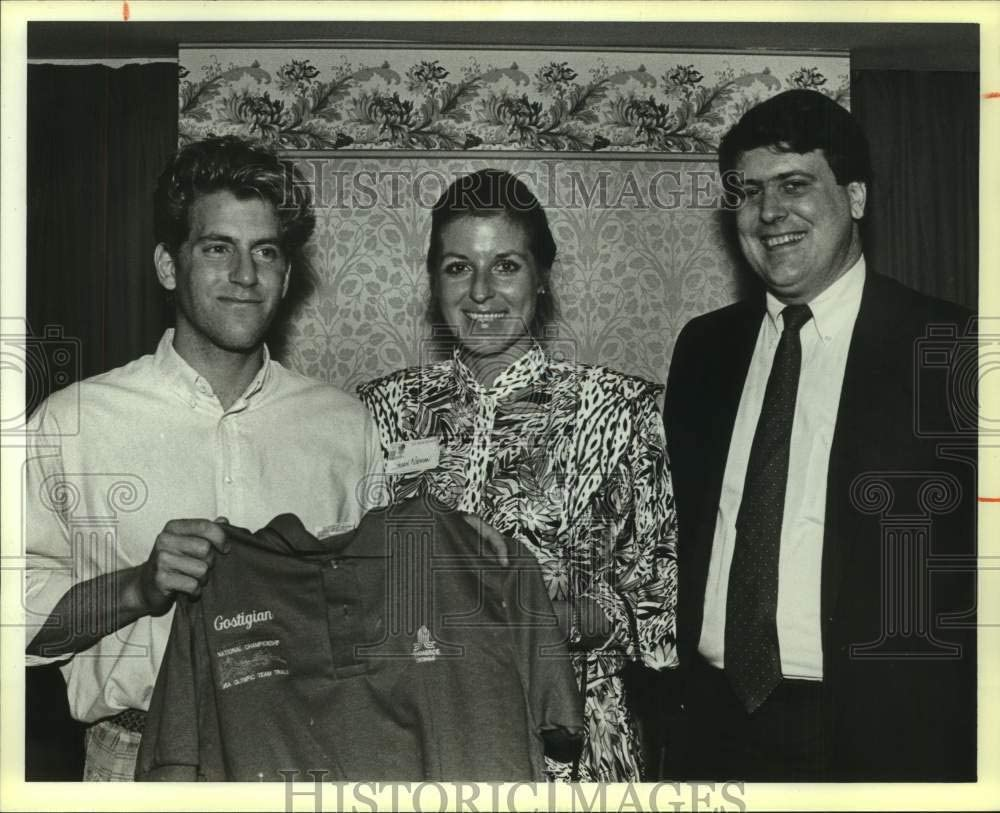
- Gostigian holding hs personal t-shirt in 1988

Personal information
- Born: February 21, 1963 (age 63) Newtown Square, Pennsylvania, U.S.
- Education: University of Notre Dame
- Height: 178 cm (5 ft 10 in)

Sport
- Sport: Modern pentathlon
- Club: New York Athletic Club

Michael Gostigian (born February 21, 1963) is a former American modern pentathlete. He competed at the 1988, 1992, and 1996 Summer Olympics. His best Olympic performance was in 1992, when he placed ninth individually and fourth with the American team.

Gostigian held the national pentathlon title in 1992-95 and won the 1992 World Cup. He attended University of Notre Dame, where he was NCAA champion in fencing in 1986. For eight years he trained with the US National swimming team. After college, Gostigian earned a master's degree in international management, and later worked as a personal trainer. He is married to the Olympic fencer Sharon Monplaisir.
