= Kim Myung-kun =

South Korean modern pentathlete

Kim Myung-Kun
Personal information
- Born: 23 March 1970 (age 56)

Sport
- Sport: Modern pentathlon

Kim Myung-Kun (born 23 March 1970) is a South Korean modern pentathlete. He competed at the 1988 and 1992 Summer Olympics.
