= Leopoldo Centeno =

Spanish modern pentathlete (born 1967)

Personal information
- Born: 27 April 1967 (age 59) Lugo, Spain

Sport
- Sport: Modern pentathlon

Leopoldo Centeno (born 27 April 1967) is a Spanish modern pentathlete. He competed at the 1988 and 1992 Summer Olympics.
