= Dirk Knappheide =

German modern pentathlete

Personal information
- Born: 10 May 1967 (age 59) Bad Iburg, West Germany

Sport
- Sport: Modern pentathlon

Dirk Knappheide (born 10 May 1967) is a German former modern pentathlete. He competed for West Germany at the 1988 Summer Olympics and for Germany at the 1992 Summer Olympics.
