= Christophe Ruer =

French modern pentathlete

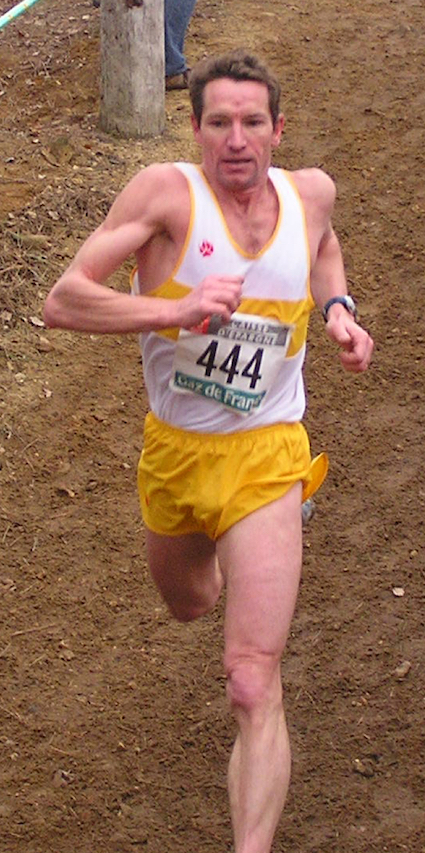
- Christophe Ruer in 2005

Personal information
- Born: 3 July 1965 Nantes, France
- Died: 27 July 2007 (aged 42) Port-Saint-Père, France

Sport
- Sport: Modern pentathlon

Christophe Ruer (3 July 1965 – 27 July 2007) was a French modern pentathlete. He competed at the 1988, 1992 and 1996 Summer Olympics. He was killed in a motorcycle accident.
