= Ivar Sisniega =

Mexican modern pentathlete (born 1958)

Personal information
- Full name: Ivar Sisniega Campbell
- Nationality: Mexican
- Born: 29 May 1958 (age 68) Kenosha, Wisconsin, United States
- Home town: Mexico City
- Height: 1.83 m (6 ft 0 in)
- Weight: 78 kg (172 lb)

Sport
- Country: Mexico
- Sport: Modern pentathlon

Ivar Sisniega Campbell (born 29 May 1958) is a Mexican modern pentathlete, politician, and businessman who is the executive president of the Mexican Football Federation. Born in the United States and raised in Mexico to a Mexican father and an American mother, he represented Mexico at the 1980, 1984 and 1988 Summer Olympics. He was formerly the head of CONADE as Sports minister under President Ernesto Zedillo from 1994 to 2000, where he created the National Youth Olympics, as well as Executive President of C.D. Guadalajara from 2002 to 2006. In 2015, he was briefly the interim President of the Pan American Sports Organization, following the death of former president Mario Vázquez Raña. His son, Pablo Sisniega, is a goalkeeper for San Diego FC.
