= Saleh Sultan Faraj =

Bahraini modern pentathlete and fencer

Saleh Farhan
Personal information
- Born: 10 January 1963 (age 63)

Sport
- Sport: Modern pentathlon, fencing

Saleh Sultan Faraj (born 10 January 1963) is a Bahraini modern pentathlete and épée fencer. He competed at the 1984 Summer Olympics and the 1988 Summer Olympics.
