= Alejandro Yrizar =

Mexican modern pentathlete (born 1965)

Personal information
- Born: 30 January 1965 (age 61)

Sport
- Sport: Modern pentathlon

Alejandro Yrizar (born 30 January 1965) is a Mexican modern pentathlete. He competed at the 1984, 1988 and 1992 Summer Olympics.
