= Andy Jung (pentathlete) =

Swiss modern pentathlete

Personal information
- Born: Andreas Jung; 1 August 1961 (age 64)

Sport
- Sport: Modern pentathlon

Andreas "Andy" Jung (born 1 August 1961) is a Swiss modern pentathlete. He competed at the 1984 and 1988 Summer Olympics.
