= László Fábián (pentathlete) =

Hungarian modern pentathlete and fencer

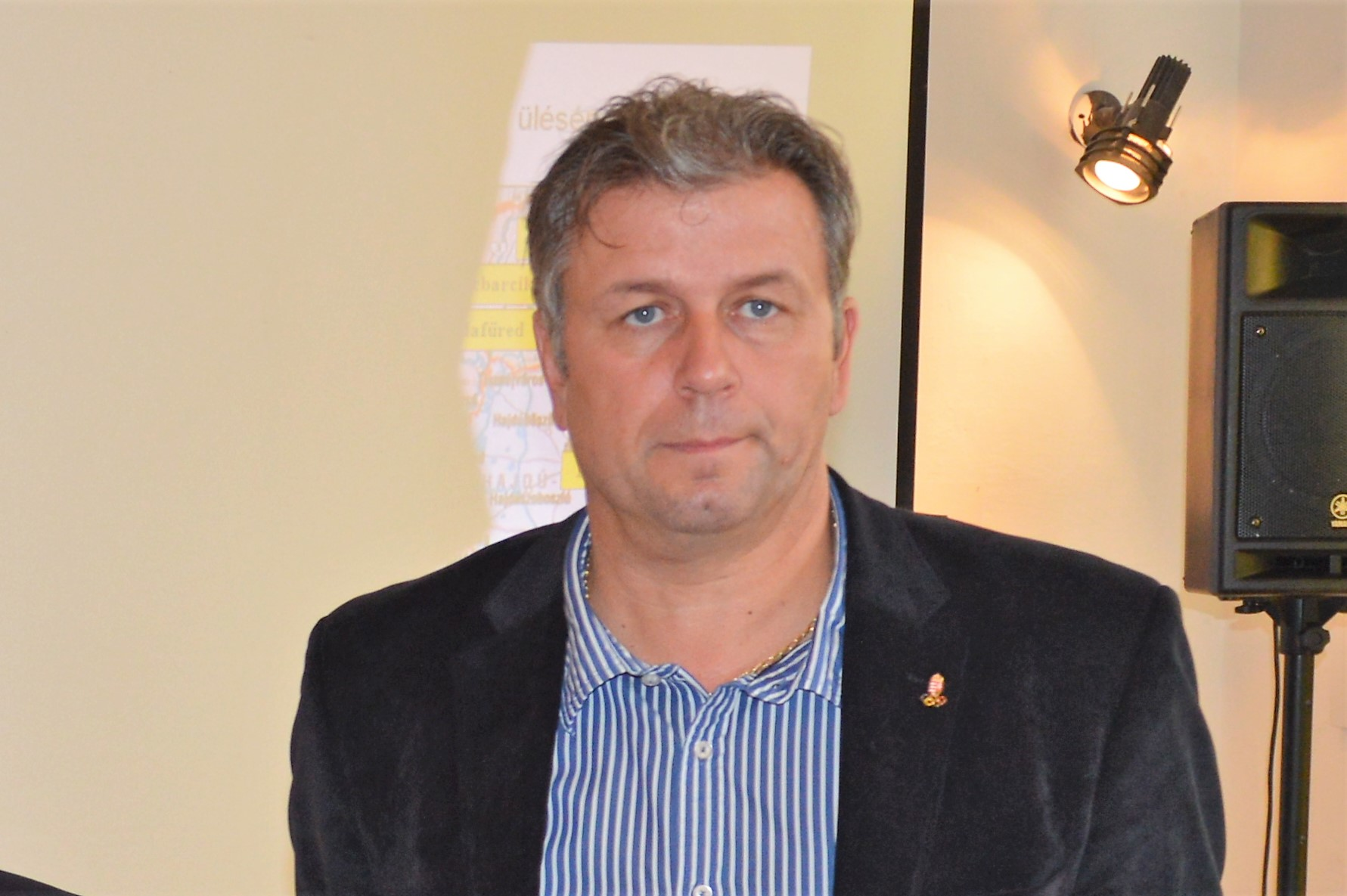

Personal information
- Born: 18 February 1963 (age 63) Budapest, Hungary

Sport
- Sport: Fencing
Medal record
Men's Modern pentathlon
Representing Hungary
Olympic Games
Men's Olympic Games
Gold medal – first place	1988 Seoul	Team
World Championships
Gold medal – first place	1987 Moulins	Team
Gold medal – first place	1989 Budapest	Team
Gold medal – first place	1989 Budapest	Individual
Gold medal – first place	1991 San Antonio	Team relay
Gold medal – first place	1993 Darmstadt	Team relay
Gold medal – first place	1994 Sheffield	Team relay
Silver medal – second place	1983 Warendorf	Team
Silver medal – second place	1985 Melbourne	Team
Silver medal – second place	1986 Montecatini	Team
Silver medal – second place	1990 Lahti	Team relay
Silver medal – second place	1993 Darmstadt	Individual
Bronze medal – third place	1987 Moulins	Individual
Bronze medal – third place	1991 San Antonio	Team

László Fábián (born 18 February 1963) is a Hungarian modern pentathlete and Olympic champion. He participated on the Hungarian team which won a gold medal at the 1988 Summer Olympics in Seoul. He also competed in the team épée fencing event at the 1988 Games.

== Awards ==
Fábián was elected Hungarian Sportsman of the Year 1989. The Olympic gold-winning pentathlon team, of which Fábián was a member, was elected Hungarian Team of the year 1988.

Awards
Preceded by Tamás Darnyi	Hungarian Sportsman of The Year; 1989	Succeeded by Tamás Darnyi
