= Carlo Massullo =

Italian modern pentathlete (born 1957)

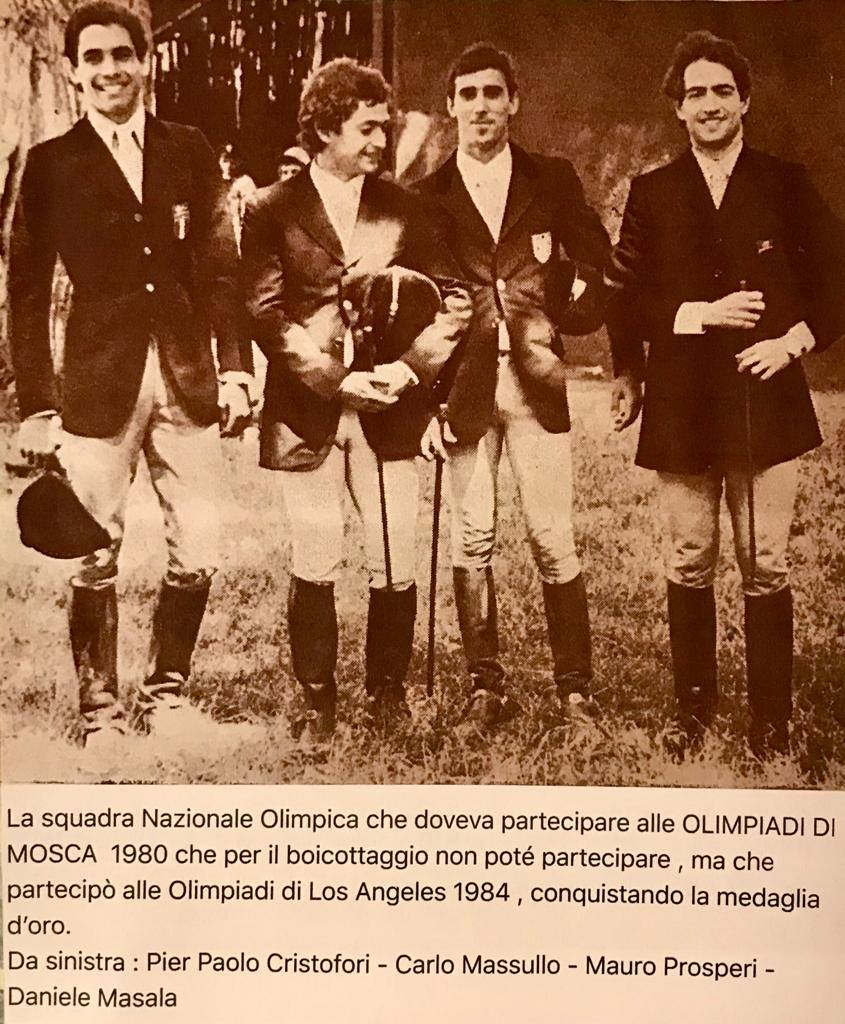
- From left to right Pierpaolo Cristofori, Carlo Massullo, Mauro Prosperi and Daniele Masala

Personal information
- Born: 13 August 1957 (age 68) Italy

Sport
- Country: Italy

Achievements and titles
- Olympic finals: Modern pentathlon: 1984 Team gold, Ind bronze 1988 Team, Ind silvers 1992 Team bronze
Medal record
Representing Italy
Men's Modern pentathlon
Olympic Games
| Gold medal – first place | 1984 Los Angeles | Team |
| Silver medal – second place | 1988 Seoul | Individual |
| Silver medal – second place | 1988 Seoul | Team |
| Bronze medal – third place | 1984 Los Angeles | Individual |
| Bronze medal – third place | 1992 Barcelona | Team |
World Championships
| Gold medal – first place | 1986 Montecatini | Individual |
| Gold medal – first place | 1986 Montecatini | Team |
| Bronze medal – third place | 1981 Zielona Góra | Team |
| Bronze medal – third place | 1985 Melbourne | Team |

Carlo Massullo (born 13 August 1957) is an Italian modern pentathlete and Olympic champion.

He participated on the Italian team which won a gold medal at the 1984 Summer Olympics in Los Angeles, and he also won an individual bronze medal.

At the 1988 Summer Olympics in Seoul he won an individual silver medal and a team silver medal. He received a bronze team medal in 1992
