= Peter Steinmann =

Swiss modern pentathlete

Personal information
- Born: 11 July 1962 (age 64)

Sport
- Sport: Modern pentathlon

Peter Steinmann (born 11 July 1962) is a Swiss modern pentathlete. He competed at the 1984, 1988 and 1992 Summer Olympics.
