= Rob Stull =

President of Union Internationale de Pentathlon Moderne

Robert Stull OLY
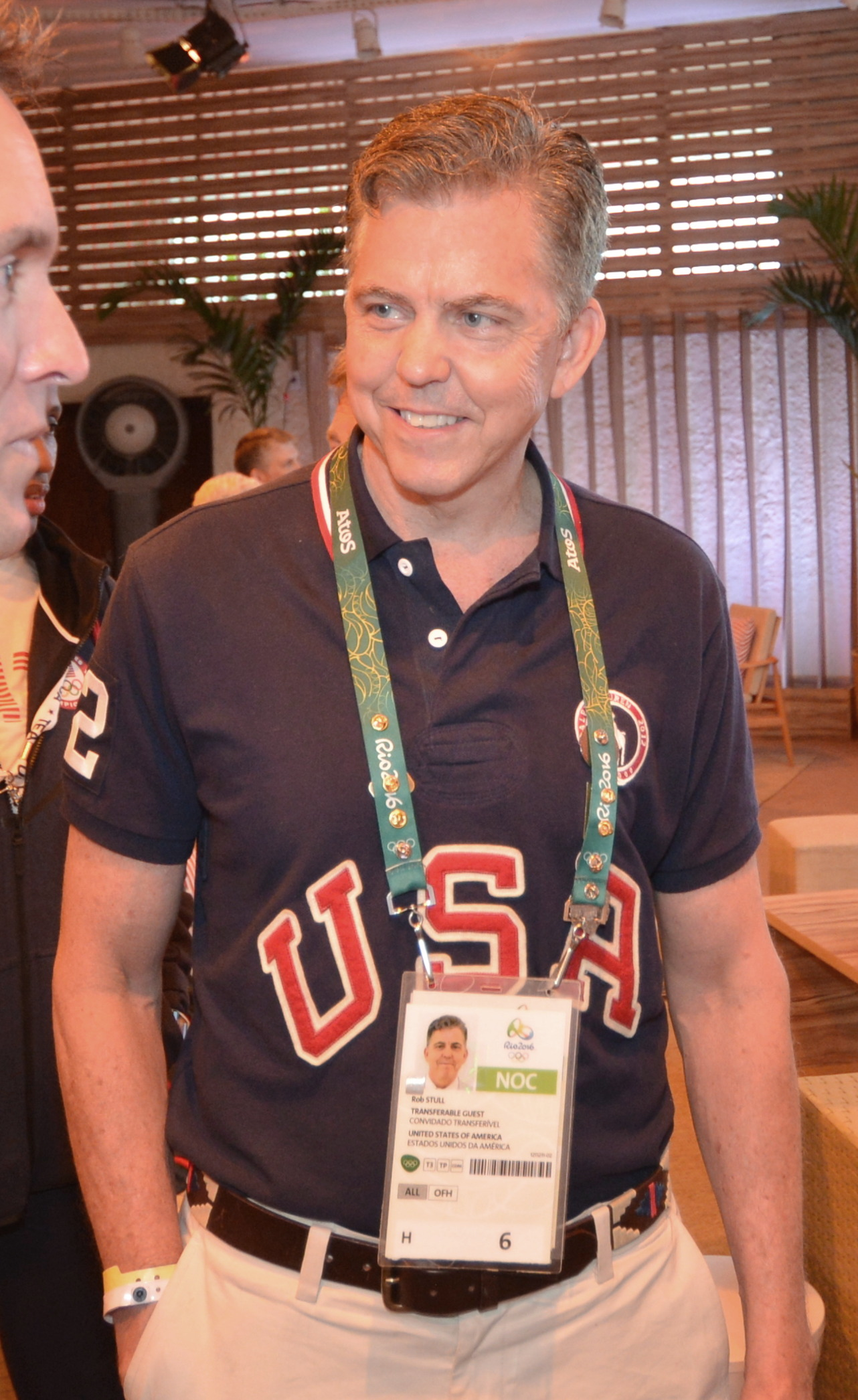
- Stull at the 2016 Olympics

Personal information
- Born: September 5, 1960 (age 65) Fort Lauderdale, Florida, United States
- Height: 186 cm (6 ft 1 in)
- Weight: 79 kg (174 lb)

Sport
- Sport: Modern pentathlon, fencing

Robert Ernest Stull (born September 5, 1960) is the President of Union Internationale de Pentathlon Moderne and an American modern pentathlete. He is also an épée fencer. He competed at the 1984, 1988 and 1992 Summer Olympics and placed 20th individually in 1988 and second with the modern pentathlon team in 1984 and fourth in 1992. After retiring from competitions Stull became a sports official. He is the president of Union Internationale de Pentathlon Moderne, director of the USA Pentathlon, a member of the United States Olympic Committee, and President of the Confederation of Modern Pentathlon for North America, Central America and the Caribbean.

== See also ==
- List of USFA Hall of Fame members
