= List of Asian Games medalists in modern pentathlon =

This is the complete list of Asian Games medalists in modern pentathlon from 1994 to 2022.

== Men ==
=== Individual ===
Games	Gold	Silver	Bronze
1994 Hiroshima	Kim Myung-kun (KOR)	Alexandr Parygin (KAZ)	Kim Mi-sub (KOR)
2002 Busan	Kim Mi-sub (KOR)	Yang Jun-ho (KOR)	Qian Zhenhua (CHN)
2010 Guangzhou	Cao Zhongrong (CHN)	Lee Choon-huan (KOR)	Kim In-hong (KOR)
2014 Incheon	Guo Jianli (CHN)	Jung Jin-hwa (KOR)	Shohei Iwamoto (JPN)
2018 Jakarta–Palembang	Jun Woong-tae (KOR)	Lee Ji-hun (KOR)	Luo Shuai (CHN)
2022 Hangzhou	Jun Woong-tae (KOR)	Lee Ji-hun (KOR)	Li Shuhuan (CHN)

=== Team ===
Games	Gold	Silver	Bronze
1994 Hiroshima	Kazakhstan (KAZ); Alexandr Parygin; Oleg Rebrov; Dmitriy Tyurin	South Korea (KOR); Joung Dae-sung; Kim Mi-sub; Kim Myung-kun	Kyrgyzstan (KGZ); Aleksandr Chvirov; Igor Feldman; Aleksandr Poddubny
2002 Busan	South Korea (KOR); Han Do-ryung; Kim Deok-bong; Kim Mi-sub; Yang Jun-ho	China (CHN); Cao Zhongrong; Liu Yanli; Qian Zhenhua; Teng Zhigang	Japan (JPN); Shoji Kurousu; Yoshinori Mizouchi; Yoshihiro Murakami; Hideyuki Saito
2010 Guangzhou	South Korea (KOR); Jung Hwon-ho; Kim In-hong; Kim Ki-hyeon; Lee Choon-huan	China (CHN); Cao Zhongrong; Liu Yanli; Wang Guan; Xu Yunqi	Japan (JPN); Shinya Fujii; Tomoya Miguchi; Hayato Noguchi; Shinichi Tomii
2014 Incheon	China (CHN); Guo Jianli; Han Jiahao; Su Haihang; Zhang Linbin	Japan (JPN); Shinya Fujii; Shohei Iwamoto; Tomoya Miguchi; Yuzuru Okubo	South Korea (KOR); Hwang Woo-jin; Jung Hwon-ho; Jung Jin-hwa; Lee Woo-jin
2022 Hangzhou	South Korea (KOR); Jun Woong-tae; Jung Jin-hwa; Lee Ji-hun	China (CHN); Chen Yan; Li Shuhuan; Zhang Linbin	Japan (JPN); Ryo Matsumoto; Taishu Sato; Kaoru Shinoki

=== Relay ===
Games	Gold	Silver	Bronze
2002 Busan	South Korea (KOR); Han Do-ryung; Jeong Tae-nam; Kim Mi-sub	Kyrgyzstan (KGZ); Andrey Hanadeyev; Mirsait Mirdjaliev; Pavel Uvarov	Kazakhstan (KAZ); Nurzhan Kusmoldanov; Andrey Skylar; Denis Starodubtsev

== Women ==
=== Individual ===
Games	Gold	Silver	Bronze
2002 Busan	Lada Jiyenbalanova (KAZ)	Dong Lean (CHN)	Chen Junmei (CHN)
2010 Guangzhou	Miao Yihua (CHN)	Wu Yanyan (CHN)	Yang Soo-jin (KOR)
2014 Incheon	Chen Qian (CHN)	Yang Soo-jin (KOR)	Choi Min-ji (KOR)
2018 Jakarta–Palembang	Zhang Mingyu (CHN)	Kim Se-hee (KOR)	Kim Sun-woo (KOR)
2022 Hangzhou	Zhang Mingyu (CHN)	Kim Sun-woo (KOR)	Bian Yufei (CHN)

=== Team ===
Games	Gold	Silver	Bronze
2002 Busan	Kazakhstan (KAZ); Galina Dolgushina; Lada Jiyenbalanova; Lyudmila Shumilova; Natalya Uvarova	China (CHN); Chen Junmei; Dong Lean; Liang Caixia; Yu Yajuan	South Korea (KOR); Goh Ae-ri; Jeong Chang-soon; Park Jung-bin; Shin Eun-mi
2010 Guangzhou	China (CHN); Chen Qian; Miao Yihua; Wu Yanyan; Zhang Ye	South Korea (KOR); Choi Min-ji; Kim Eun-byeol; Mun Ye-rin; Yang Soo-jin	Kazakhstan (KAZ); Xeniya Alexandrova; Galina Dolgushina; Lada Jiyenbalanova; Anna Shondina
2014 Incheon	South Korea (KOR); Choi Min-ji; Jeong Min-a; Kim Sun-woo; Yang Soo-jin	Japan (JPN); Atsuko Itani; Narumi Kurosu; Rena Shimazu; Shino Yamanaka	China (CHN); Bian Yufei; Chen Qian; Liang Wanxia; Wang Wei
2022 Hangzhou	China (CHN); Bian Yufei; Zhang Mingyu; Zhong Xiuting	Japan (JPN); Hana Shibata; Misaki Uchida; Kanae Umemura	South Korea (KOR); Kim Se-hee; Kim Sun-woo; Seong Seung-min

=== Relay ===
Games	Gold	Silver	Bronze
2002 Busan	South Korea (KOR); Jeong Chang-soon; Park Jung-bin; Shin Eun-mi	China (CHN); Chen Junmei; Dong Lean; Wang Yan	Kazakhstan (KAZ); Lada Jiyenbalanova; Lyudmila Shumilova; Natalya Uvarova
