= Modern pentathlon at the Asian Games =

- Governing bodies: UIPM (World) / AMPC (Asia)
- Events: 4 (men: 2; women: 2)

Games
- 1951; 1954; 1958; 1962; 1966; 1970; 1974; 1978; 1982; 1986; 1990; 1994; 1998; 2002; 2006; 2010; 2014; 2018; 2022; 2026
- Medalists

Modern pentathlon is an Asian Games event first held at the 1994 in Hiroshima, Japan.

== Editions ==
Games	Year	Host city	Best nation
XII	1994	Hiroshima, Japan	South Korea
XIV	2002	Busan, South Korea	South Korea
XVI	2010	Guangzhou, China	China
XVII	2014	Incheon, South Korea	China
XVIII	2018	Jakarta–Palembang, Indonesia	South Korea
XIX	2022	Hangzhou, China	South Korea

== Events ==
Event	94	02	10	14	18	22	26	Years
Men's individual	X	X	X	X	X	X	X	7
Men's team	X	X	X	X		X	X	6
Men's relay		X						1
Women's individual		X	X	X	X	X	X	6
Women's team		X	X	X		X	X	5
Women's relay		X						1
Total	2	6	4	4	2	4	4	26

== Medal table ==
Rank	Nation	Gold	Silver	Bronze	Total
1	South Korea (KOR)	10	10	8	28
2	China (CHN)	9	7	6	22
3	Kazakhstan (KAZ)	3	1	3	7
4	Japan (JPN)	0	3	4	7
5	Kyrgyzstan (KGZ)	0	1	1	2
Totals (5 entries)		22	22	22	66

== Participating nations ==
Nation	94	02	10	14	18	22	Years
Bahrain		4					1
China	3	11	8	8	4	8	6
Chinese Taipei		3					1
India						1	1
Indonesia					4	2	2
Japan	3	4	6	8	4	6	6
Kazakhstan	3	8	4	8	4	8	6
Kyrgyzstan	3	5	5	8	3	5	6
Mongolia					1	1	2
Singapore						1	1
South Korea	3	9	8	8	4	8	6
Thailand					4	4	2
Uzbekistan	1	4	2	3		4	5
Number of nations	6	8	6	6	8	11	
Number of athletes	16	48	33	43	28	48	
