= Modern pentathlon at the 2002 Asian Games =

- Venue: Changwon International Shooting Range; Changwon Evergreen Hall; Changwon Swimming Pool; Busan Equestrian Grounds; Samnak Riverside Athletic Park
- Dates: 10–13 October 2002
- Competitors: 48 from 8 nations

Modern pentathlon was one of the many sports which was held at the 2002 Asian Games in Changwon International Shooting Range, Changwon Evergreen Hall, Changwon Swimming Pool, Busan Equestrian Grounds and Samnak Riverside Athletic Park in Changwon and Busan, South Korea between 10 and 13 October 2002.

The host nation South Korea finished first in medal table with four gold medals.

== Schedule ==
F	Final

Event↓/Date →	10th Thu	11th Fri	12th Sat	13th Sun
Men's individual		F		
Men's team		F		
Men's relay				F
Women's individual	F			
Women's team	F			
Women's relay			F	

== Medalists ==
=== Men ===
Event	Gold	Silver	Bronze
Individual	Kim Mi-sub; South Korea	Yang Jun-ho; South Korea	Qian Zhenhua; China
Team	South Korea; Han Do-ryung; Kim Deok-bong; Kim Mi-sub; Yang Jun-ho	China; Cao Zhongrong; Liu Yanli; Qian Zhenhua; Teng Zhigang	Japan; Shoji Kurousu; Yoshinori Mizouchi; Yoshihiro Murakami; Hideyuki Saito
Relay	South Korea; Han Do-ryung; Jeong Tae-nam; Kim Mi-sub	Kyrgyzstan; Andrey Hanadeyev; Mirsait Mirdjaliev; Pavel Uvarov	Kazakhstan; Nurzhan Kusmoldanov; Andrey Skylar; Denis Starodubtsev

=== Women ===
Event	Gold	Silver	Bronze
Individual	Lada Jiyenbalanova; Kazakhstan	Dong Lean; China	Chen Junmei; China
Team	Kazakhstan; Galina Dolgushina; Lada Jiyenbalanova; Lyudmila Shumilova; Natalya Uvarova	China; Chen Junmei; Dong Lean; Liang Caixia; Yu Yajuan	South Korea; Goh Ae-ri; Jeong Chang-soon; Park Jung-bin; Shin Eun-mi
Relay	South Korea; Jeong Chang-soon; Park Jung-bin; Shin Eun-mi	China; Chen Junmei; Dong Lean; Wang Yan	Kazakhstan; Lada Jiyenbalanova; Lyudmila Shumilova; Natalya Uvarova

== Medal table ==
Rank	Nation	Gold	Silver	Bronze	Total
1	South Korea (KOR)	4	1	1	6
2	Kazakhstan (KAZ)	2	0	2	4
3	China (CHN)	0	4	2	6
4	Kyrgyzstan (KGZ)	0	1	0	1
5	Japan (JPN)	0	0	1	1
Totals (5 entries)		6	6	6	18

== Participating nations ==
A total of 48 athletes from 8 nations competed in modern pentathlon at the 2002 Asian Games:

- Bahrain (4)
- China (11)
- Chinese Taipei (3)
- Japan (4)
- Kazakhstan (8)
- Kyrgyzstan (5)
- South Korea (9)
- Uzbekistan (4)
