= Modern pentathlon at the 2010 Asian Games =

- Venue: Huangcun Sports Base; Aoti Aquatics Centre
- Dates: 23–24 November 2010
- Competitors: 33 from 6 nations

Modern pentathlon at the 2010 Asian Games was held in Huangcun Sports Base and Aoti Aquatics Centre Guangzhou, China between 23 November and 24 November 2010.

== Schedule ==
F	Final

Event↓/Date →	23rd Tue	24th Wed
Men's individual		F
Men's team		F
Women's individual	F	
Women's team	F	

== Medalists ==
=== Men ===
Event	Gold	Silver	Bronze
Individual	Cao Zhongrong; China	Lee Choon-huan; South Korea	Kim In-hong; South Korea
Team	South Korea; Jung Hwon-ho; Kim In-hong; Kim Ki-hyeon; Lee Choon-huan	China; Cao Zhongrong; Liu Yanli; Wang Guan; Xu Yunqi	Japan; Shinya Fujii; Tomoya Miguchi; Hayato Noguchi; Shinichi Tomii

=== Women ===
Event	Gold	Silver	Bronze
Individual	Miao Yihua; China	Wu Yanyan; China	Yang Soo-jin; South Korea
Team	China; Chen Qian; Miao Yihua; Wu Yanyan; Zhang Ye	South Korea; Choi Min-ji; Kim Eun-byeol; Mun Ye-rin; Yang Soo-jin	Kazakhstan; Xeniya Alexandrova; Galina Dolgushina; Lada Jiyenbalanova; Anna Shondina

== Medal table ==
Rank	Nation	Gold	Silver	Bronze	Total
1	China (CHN)	3	2	0	5
2	South Korea (KOR)	1	2	2	5
3	Japan (JPN)	0	0	1	1
3	Kazakhstan (KAZ)	0	0	1	1
Totals (4 entries)		4	4	4	12

== Participating nations ==
A total of 33 athletes from 6 nations competed in modern pentathlon at the 2010 Asian Games:

- China (8)
- Japan (6)
- Kazakhstan (4)
- Kyrgyzstan (5)
- South Korea (8)
- Uzbekistan (2)
