= Modern pentathlon at the 2002 Asian Games – Men's individual =

Men's individual at the 2002 Asian Games
- Venue: Changwon International Shooting Range; Changwon Evergreen Hall; Changwon Swimming Pool; Busan Equestrian Grounds; Samnak Riverside Athletic Park
- Date: 11 October 2002
- Competitors: 28 from 7 nations

Medalists
gold medal	Kim Mi-sub	South Korea
silver medal	Yang Jun-ho	South Korea
bronze medal	Qian Zhenhua	China

The men's individual competition at the 2002 Asian Games in Busan was held on 11 October 2002.

== Schedule ==
All times are Korea Standard Time (UTC+09:00)

Date	Time	Event
Friday, 11 October 2002	07:00	Shooting
Friday, 11 October 2002	09:00	Fencing
Friday, 11 October 2002	13:00	Swimming
Friday, 11 October 2002	15:00	Riding
Friday, 11 October 2002	18:00	Running

== Results ==
Legend

- DNS — Did not start

=== Shooting ===
Rank	Athlete	Result	Pen.	Points
1	Andrey Skylar (KAZ)	187		1180
2	Abdulrahman Khaled (BRN)	185		1156
3	Yoshihiro Murakami (JPN)	184		1144
4	Qian Zhenhua (CHN)	184		1144
5	Denis Starodubtsev (KAZ)	183		1132
6	Kim Deok-bong (KOR)	182		1120
7	Nurzhan Kusmoldanov (KAZ)	180		1096
8	Yang Jun-ho (KOR)	179		1084
9	Han Do-ryung (KOR)	178		1072
10	Evgeny Egorenko (KGZ)	177		1060
11	Liu Yanli (CHN)	176		1048
12	Pavel Uvarov (KGZ)	176		1048
13	Kim Mi-sub (KOR)	175		1036
14	Teng Zhigang (CHN)	175		1036
15	Hideyuki Saito (JPN)	175		1036
16	Cao Zhongrong (CHN)	175		1036
17	Shoji Kurousu (JPN)	173		1012
18	Arkadiy Makrushev (UZB)	173		1012
19	Mirsait Mirdjaliev (KGZ)	173		1012
20	Vladimir Sidorov (UZB)	172		1000
21	Yoshinori Mizouchi (JPN)	185	200	956
22	Khalifa Hamad Khamis (BRN)	167		940
23	Salah Busafar (BRN)	166		928
24	Nikolay Vasilev (UZB)	165		916
25	Ali Salman Yusuf (BRN)	162		880
26	Andrey Hanadeyev (KGZ)	161		868
27	Sergey Spasov (UZB)	158		832
28	Dmitriy Maryanov (KAZ)	154		784

=== Fencing ===
Rank	Athlete	Won	Lost	Pen.	Points
1	Kim Mi-sub (KOR)	21	6		1064
2	Yang Jun-ho (KOR)	19	8		1084
3	Arkadiy Makrushev (UZB)	18	9		968
3	Han Do-ryung (KOR)	18	9		968
5	Andrey Skylar (KAZ)	17	10		936
5	Qian Zhenhua (CHN)	17	10		936
7	Liu Yanli (CHN)	16	11		904
8	Cao Zhongrong (CHN)	14	13		840
8	Mirsait Mirdjaliev (KGZ)	14	13		840
8	Hideyuki Saito (JPN)	14	13		840
8	Vladimir Sidorov (UZB)	14	13		840
8	Pavel Uvarov (KGZ)	14	13		840
8	Nurzhan Kusmoldanov (KAZ)	14	13		840
14	Andrey Hanadeyev (KGZ)	13	14		808
14	Dmitriy Maryanov (KAZ)	13	14		808
14	Teng Zhigang (CHN)	13	14		808
14	Abdulrahman Khaled (BRN)	13	14		808
14	Yoshihiro Murakami (JPN)	13	14		808
14	Salah Busafar (BRN)	13	14		808
20	Shoji Kurousu (JPN)	12	15		776
20	Denis Starodubtsev (KAZ)	12	15		776
20	Kim Deok-bong (KOR)	12	15		776
23	Yoshinori Mizouchi (JPN)	11	16		744
24	Nikolay Vasilev (UZB)	10	17		712
25	Evgeny Egorenko (KGZ)	9	18		680
26	Sergey Spasov (UZB)	8	19		648
26	Ali Salman Yusuf (BRN)	8	19		648
28	Khalifa Hamad Khamis (BRN)	7	20		616

=== Swimming ===
Rank	Athlete	Time	Pen.	Points
1	Cao Zhongrong (CHN)	2:02.63		1332
2	Yoshihiro Murakami (JPN)	2:04.16		1312
3	Shoji Kurousu (JPN)	2:04.73		1304
4	Kim Mi-sub (KOR)	2:05.90		1292
5	Liu Yanli (CHN)	2:06.95		1280
6	Vladimir Sidorov (UZB)	2:07.03		1276
7	Hideyuki Saito (JPN)	2:07.05		1276
8	Qian Zhenhua (CHN)	2:07.24		1276
9	Yoshinori Mizouchi (JPN)	2:08.95		1256
10	Nurzhan Kusmoldanov (KAZ)	2:09.33		1248
11	Yang Jun-ho (KOR)	2:10.07		1240
12	Han Do-ryung (KOR)	2:10.40		1236
13	Teng Zhigang (CHN)	2:11.26		1228
14	Nikolay Vasilev (UZB)	2:11.64		1224
15	Kim Deok-bong (KOR)	2:12.43		1212
16	Dmitriy Maryanov (KAZ)	2:12.56		1212
17	Denis Starodubtsev (KAZ)	2:13.22		1204
18	Pavel Uvarov (KGZ)	2:15.29		1180
19	Abdulrahman Khaled (BRN)	2:15.49		1176
20	Sergey Spasov (UZB)	2:16.74		1160
21	Evgeny Egorenko (KGZ)	2:16.92		1160
22	Andrey Skylar (KAZ)	2:17.31		1156
23	Andrey Hanadeyev (KGZ)	2:17.80		1148
24	Khalifa Hamad Khamis (BRN)	2:21.99		1100
25	Mirsait Mirdjaliev (KGZ)	2:23.85		1076
26	Ali Salman Yusuf (BRN)	2:30.17		1000
27	Salah Busafar (BRN)	2:32.18		976
28	Arkadiy Makrushev (UZB)	2:32.23		976

=== Riding ===
Rank	Athlete	Horse	Time	Pen.	Points
1	Abdulrahman Khaled (BRN)	Zina	1:05.41		1200
2	Arkadiy Makrushev (UZB)	Zina	1:05.97		1200
3	Kim Mi-sub (KOR)	Soyka	1:06.09		1200
4	Denis Starodubtsev (KAZ)	Swoop	1:06.70		1200
5	Andrey Skylar (KAZ)	Chrysler	1:01.46	28	1172
6	Yang Jun-ho (KOR)	Flare	1:04.18	28	1172
7	Pavel Uvarov (KGZ)	Atoz	1:07.10	28	1172
8	Vladimir Sidorov (UZB)	Atoz	1:08.40	28	1172
9	Kim Deok-bong (KOR)	Viva	1:13.66	28	1172
10	Hideyuki Saito (JPN)	Tuxy Do	1:15.53	28	1172
11	Teng Zhigang (CHN)	Swoop	1:20.05	40	1160
12	Khalifa Hamad Khamis (BRN)	Flare	1:04.75	56	1144
13	Han Do-ryung (KOR)	Gilber	1:10.48	68	1132
14	Qian Zhenhua (CHN)	Captain Masik	1:10.25	84	1116
15	Yoshihiro Murakami (JPN)	Ottaba Jack Flash	1:18.26	88	1112
16	Nikolay Vasilev (UZB)	Daeg Gu CC	1:00.79	112	1088
17	Andrey Hanadeyev (KGZ)	Ottaba Jack Flash	1:11.95	112	1088
18	Liu Yanli (CHN)	Daeg Gu CC	1:18.25	116	1084
19	Ali Salman Yusuf (BRN)	Soyka	1:12.20	140	1060
20	Mirsait Mirdjaliev (KGZ)	J. Watch	1:04.87	168	1032
21	Cao Zhongrong (CHN)	Bally Money	1:14.48	168	1032
22	Yoshinori Mizouchi (JPN)	Tuxy Do	1:16.93	168	1032
23	Shoji Kurousu (JPN)	Viva	1:24.75	172	1028
24	Dmitriy Maryanov (KAZ)	Chrysler	1:17.89	192	1008
25	Nurzhan Kusmoldanov (KAZ)	J. Watch	1:11.18	224	976
26	Evgeny Egorenko (KGZ)	Bally Money	1:15.46	264	936
27	Sergey Spasov (UZB)	Captain Masik	1:32.00	864	336
—	Salah Busafar (BRN)	Gilber	DNS		0

=== Running ===
Rank	Athlete	Time	Pen.	Points
1	Teng Zhigang (CHN)	9:17.41		1172
2	Liu Yanli (CHN)	9:18.82		1168
3	Pavel Uvarov (KGZ)	9:19.86		1164
4	Hideyuki Saito (JPN)	9:24.37		1144
5	Cao Zhongrong (CHN)	9:25.33		1140
6	Shoji Kurousu (JPN)	9:25.51		1140
7	Vladimir Sidorov (UZB)	9:25.79		1140
8	Han Do-ryung (KOR)	9:27.74		1132
9	Nurzhan Kusmoldanov (KAZ)	9:30.17		1120
10	Yang Jun-ho (KOR)	9:33.05		1108
11	Mirsait Mirdjaliev (KGZ)	9:35.56		1100
12	Evgeny Egorenko (KGZ)	9:38.24		1088
13	Andrey Hanadeyev (KGZ)	9:38.93		1088
14	Kim Mi-sub (KOR)	9:41.61		1076
15	Kim Deok-bong (KOR)	9:41.73		1076
16	Dmitriy Maryanov (KAZ)	9:33.07	40	1068
17	Denis Starodubtsev (KAZ)	9:44.75		1064
18	Yoshinori Mizouchi (JPN)	9:45.80		1060
19	Yoshihiro Murakami (JPN)	9:46.05		1056
20	Qian Zhenhua (CHN)	9:47.63		1052
21	Nikolay Vasilev (UZB)	9:47.87		1052
22	Andrey Skylar (KAZ)	9:52.38		1032
23	Sergey Spasov (UZB)	9:56.04		1016
24	Ali Salman Yusuf (BRN)	10:03.78		988
25	Abdulrahman Khaled (BRN)	10:19.67		924
26	Khalifa Hamad Khamis (BRN)	10:20.09		920
27	Salah Busafar (BRN)	10:23.19		908
28	Arkadiy Makrushev (UZB)	10:34.62		864

=== Summary ===
Rank	Athlete	Shoot	Fence	Swim	Ride	Run	Total	Time
1st place, gold medalist(s)	Kim Mi-sub (KOR)	1036	1064	1292	1200	1076	5668	
2nd place, silver medalist(s)	Yang Jun-ho (KOR)	1084	1000	1240	1172	1108	5604	+0:15
3	Han Do-ryung (KOR)	1072	968	1236	1132	1132	5540	+0:32
3rd place, bronze medalist(s)	Qian Zhenhua (CHN)	1144	936	1276	1116	1052	5524	+0:36
5	Liu Yanli (CHN)	1048	904	1280	1084	1168	5484	+0:46
6	Andrey Skylar (KAZ)	1180	936	1156	1172	1032	5476	+0:48
7	Hideyuki Saito (JPN)	1036	840	1276	1172	1144	5468	+0:50
8	Yoshihiro Murakami (JPN)	1144	808	1312	1112	1056	5432	+0:58
9	Vladimir Sidorov (UZB)	1000	840	1276	1172	1140	5428	+1:00
10	Teng Zhigang (CHN)	1036	808	1228	1160	1172	5404	+1:06
11	Pavel Uvarov (KGZ)	1048	840	1180	1172	1164	5404	+1:06
12	Cao Zhongrong (CHN)	1036	840	1332	1032	1140	5380	+1:12
13	Denis Starodubtsev (KAZ)	1132	776	1204	1200	1064	5376	+1:13
14	Kim Deok-bong (KOR)	1120	776	1212	1172	1076	5356	+1:18
15	Nurzhan Kusmoldanov (KAZ)	1096	840	1248	976	1120	5280	+1:37
16	Abdulrahman Khaled (BRN)	1156	808	1176	1200	924	5264	+1:41
17	Shoji Kurousu (JPN)	1012	776	1304	1028	1140	5260	+1:42
18	Mirsait Mirdjaliev (KGZ)	1012	840	1076	1032	1100	5060	+2:32
19	Yoshinori Mizouchi (JPN)	956	744	1256	1032	1060	5048	+2:35
20	Arkadiy Makrushev (UZB)	1012	968	976	1200	864	5020	+2:42
21	Andrey Hanadeyev (KGZ)	868	808	1148	1088	1088	5000	+2:47
22	Nikolay Vasilev (UZB)	916	712	1224	1088	1052	4992	+2:49
23	Evgeny Egorenko (KGZ)	1060	680	1160	936	1088	4924	+3:06
24	Dmitriy Maryanov (KAZ)	784	808	1212	1008	1068	4880	+3:17
25	Khalifa Hamad Khamis (BRN)	940	616	1100	1144	920	4720	+3:56
26	Ali Salman Yusuf (BRN)	880	648	1000	1060	988	4576	+4:33
27	Sergey Spasov (UZB)	832	648	1160	336	1016	3992	+6:58
28	Salah Busafar (BRN)	928	808	976	0	908	3620	+8:32

- Qian Zhenhua was awarded bronze because of no three-medal sweep per country rule.
