= Modern pentathlon at the 2002 Asian Games – Men's team =

Men's team at the 2002 Asian Games
- Venue: Changwon International Shooting Range; Changwon Evergreen Hall; Changwon Swimming Pool; Busan Equestrian Grounds; Samnak Riverside Athletic Park
- Date: 11 October 2002
- Competitors: 28 from 7 nations

Medalists
gold medal	South Korea; Han Do-ryung, Kim Deok-bong, Kim Mi-sub, Yang Jun-ho
silver medal	China; Cao Zhongrong, Liu Yanli, Qian Zhenhua, Teng Zhigang
bronze medal	Japan; Shoji Kurousu, Yoshinori Mizouchi, Yoshihiro Murakami, Hideyuki Saito

The men's team competition at the 2002 Asian Games in Busan was held on 11 October 2002.

== Schedule ==
All times are Korea Standard Time (UTC+09:00)

Date	Time	Event
Friday, 11 October 2002	07:00	Shooting
Friday, 11 October 2002	09:00	Fencing
Friday, 11 October 2002	13:00	Swimming
Friday, 11 October 2002	15:00	Riding
Friday, 11 October 2002	18:00	Running

== Results ==
Rank	Team	Shoot	Fence	Swim	Ride	Run	Total
1st place, gold medalist(s)	South Korea (KOR)	4312	3808	4980	4676	4392	22168
	Han Do-ryung	1072	968	1236	1132	1132	5540
	Kim Deok-bong	1120	776	1212	1172	1076	5356
	Kim Mi-sub	1036	1064	1292	1200	1076	5668
	Yang Jun-ho	1084	1000	1240	1172	1108	5604
2nd place, silver medalist(s)	China (CHN)	4264	3488	5116	4392	4532	21792
	Cao Zhongrong	1036	840	1332	1032	1140	5380
	Liu Yanli	1048	904	1280	1084	1168	5484
	Qian Zhenhua	1144	936	1276	1116	1052	5524
	Teng Zhigang	1036	808	1228	1160	1172	5404
3rd place, bronze medalist(s)	Japan (JPN)	4148	3168	5148	4344	4400	21208
	Shoji Kurousu	1012	776	1304	1028	1140	5260
	Yoshinori Mizouchi	956	744	1256	1032	1060	5048
	Yoshihiro Murakami	1144	808	1312	1112	1056	5432
	Hideyuki Saito	1036	840	1276	1172	1144	5468
4	Kazakhstan (KAZ)	4192	3360	4820	4356	4284	21012
	Nurzhan Kusmoldanov	1096	840	1248	976	1120	5280
	Dmitriy Maryanov	784	808	1212	1008	1068	4880
	Andrey Skylar	1180	936	1156	1172	1032	5476
	Denis Starodubtsev	1132	776	1204	1200	1064	5376
5	Kyrgyzstan (KGZ)	3988	3168	4564	4228	4440	20388
	Evgeny Egorenko	1060	680	1160	936	1088	4924
	Andrey Hanadeyev	868	808	1148	1088	1088	5000
	Mirsait Mirdjaliev	1012	840	1076	1032	1100	5060
	Pavel Uvarov	1048	840	1180	1172	1164	5404
6	Uzbekistan (UZB)	3760	3168	4636	3796	4072	19432
	Arkadiy Makrushev	1012	968	976	1200	864	5020
	Vladimir Sidorov	1000	840	1276	1172	1140	5428
	Sergey Spasov	832	648	1160	336	1016	3992
	Nikolay Vasilev	916	712	1224	1088	1052	4992
7	Bahrain (BRN)	3904	2880	4252	3404	3740	18180
	Salman Yusuf Ali	880	648	1000	1060	988	4576
	Salah Busafar	928	808	976	0	908	3620
	Abdulrahman Khaled	1156	808	1176	1200	924	5264
	Khalifa Hamad Khamis	940	616	1100	1144	920	4720
