= Modern pentathlon at the 1994 Asian Games – Men's individual =

Men's individual at the 1994 Asian Games
- Venue: Mihara Region Plaza
- Date: 9–11 October 1994
- Competitors: 16 from 6 nations

Medalists
gold medal	Kim Myung-kun	South Korea
silver medal	Alexandr Parygin	Kazakhstan
bronze medal	Kim Mi-sub	South Korea

The men's individual modern pentathlon competition at the 1994 Asian Games was held in Mihara, Hiroshima, Japan from 9 to 11 October 1994.

== Schedule ==
All times are Japan Standard Time (UTC+09:00)

Date	Time	Event
Sunday, 9 October 1994	09:00	Fencing
Sunday, 9 October 1994	16:00	Running
Monday, 10 October 1994	08:00	Swimming
Monday, 10 October 1994	13:00	Shooting
Tuesday, 11 October 1994	09:00	Riding

== Results ==
Rank	Athlete	Fence	Run	Swim	Shoot	Ride	Total
1st place, gold medalist(s)	Kim Myung-kun (KOR)	1000	967	1280	1012	1070	5329
2nd place, silver medalist(s)	Alexandr Parygin (KAZ)	808	1027	1208	1084	1100	5227
3rd place, bronze medalist(s)	Kim Mi-sub (KOR)	832	994	1324	1000	1010	5160
4	Oleg Rebrov (KAZ)	880	1093	1200	880	1100	5153
5	Dmitriy Tyurin (KAZ)	760	1069	1208	1096	980	5113
6	Aleksandr Chvirov (KGZ)	712	1048	1212	1036	1100	5108
7	Igor Feldman (KGZ)	856	1087	1112	1084	907	5046
8	Miao Kai (CHN)	808	898	1204	1120	1000	5030
9	Yakub Ashrapov (UZB)	702	985	1256	952	1100	4995
10	Aleksandr Poddubny (KGZ)	832	1024	1060	904	1040	4860
11	Joung Dae-sung (KOR)	712	844	1224	952	1067	4799
12	Hiroshi Miyagahara (JPN)	688	1006	1084	940	1070	4788
13	Zhang Bin (CHN)	808	805	1076	1036	1052	4777
14	Takuji Yoneuji (JPN)	496	916	1224	1012	1100	4748
15	Tatsuya Kosai (JPN)	712	1135	960	832	1070	4709
16	Dong Haoyu (CHN)	664	1000	1164	748	1070	4646
