= Modern pentathlon at the 2014 Asian Games =

- Venue: Dream Park
- Dates: 2–3 October 2014
- Competitors: 43 from 6 nations

Modern pentathlon at the 2014 Asian Games was held in Dream Park, Incheon, South Korea between 2 and 3 October 2014.

== Schedule ==
F	Final

Event↓/Date →	2nd Thu	3rd Fri
Men's individual		F
Men's team		F
Women's individual	F	
Women's team	F	

== Medalists ==
=== Men ===
Event	Gold	Silver	Bronze
Individual	Guo Jianli; China	Jung Jin-hwa; South Korea	Shohei Iwamoto; Japan
Team	China; Guo Jianli; Han Jiahao; Su Haihang; Zhang Linbin	Japan; Shinya Fujii; Shohei Iwamoto; Tomoya Miguchi; Yuzuru Okubo	South Korea; Hwang Woo-jin; Jung Hwon-ho; Jung Jin-hwa; Lee Woo-jin

=== Women ===
Event	Gold	Silver	Bronze
Individual	Chen Qian; China	Yang Soo-jin; South Korea	Choi Min-ji; South Korea
Team	South Korea; Choi Min-ji; Jeong Min-a; Kim Sun-woo; Yang Soo-jin	Japan; Atsuko Itani; Narumi Kurosu; Rena Shimazu; Shino Yamanaka	China; Bian Yufei; Chen Qian; Liang Wanxia; Wang Wei

== Medal table ==
Rank	Nation	Gold	Silver	Bronze	Total
1	China (CHN)	3	0	1	4
2	South Korea (KOR)	1	2	2	5
3	Japan (JPN)	0	2	1	3
Totals (3 entries)		4	4	4	12

== Participating nations ==
A total of 43 athletes from 6 nations competed in modern pentathlon at the 2014 Asian Games:

- China (8)
- Japan (8)
- Kazakhstan (8)
- Kyrgyzstan (8)
- South Korea (8)
- Uzbekistan (3)
