= Modern pentathlon at the 2002 Asian Games – Women's individual =

Women's individual at the 2002 Asian Games
- Venue: Changwon International Shooting Range; Changwon Evergreen Hall; Changwon Swimming Pool; Busan Equestrian Grounds; Samnak Riverside Athletic Park
- Date: 10 October 2002
- Competitors: 16 from 5 nations

Medalists
gold medal	Lada Jiyenbalanova	Kazakhstan
silver medal	Dong Lean	China
bronze medal	Chen Junmei	China

The women's individual competition at the 2002 Asian Games in Busan was held on 10 October 2002.

== Schedule ==
All times are Korea Standard Time (UTC+09:00)

Date	Time	Event
Thursday, 10 October 2002	07:00	Shooting
Thursday, 10 October 2002	09:00	Fencing
Thursday, 10 October 2002	13:00	Swimming
Thursday, 10 October 2002	15:00	Riding
Thursday, 10 October 2002	18:00	Running

== Results ==
=== Shooting ===
Rank	Athlete	Result	Pen.	Points
1	Jeong Chang-soon (KOR)	181		1108
2	Park Jung-bin (KOR)	181		1108
3	Chen Yi-wen (TPE)	178		1072
4	Kung Hsien-wen (TPE)	178		1072
5	Natalya Uvarova (KAZ)	177		1060
6	Lyudmila Shumilova (KAZ)	177		1060
7	Roza Bikkinina (KGZ)	176		1048
8	Chen Junmei (CHN)	175		1036
9	Goh Ae-ri (KOR)	175		1036
10	Han Chiao-jung (TPE)	175		1036
11	Yu Yajuan (CHN)	174		1024
12	Dong Lean (CHN)	174		1024
13	Galina Dolgushina (KAZ)	167		940
14	Shin Eun-mi (KOR)	159		844
15	Lada Jiyenbalanova (KAZ)	157		820
16	Liang Caixia (CHN)	152		760

=== Fencing ===
Rank	Athlete	Won	Lost	Pen.	Points
1	Lada Jiyenbalanova (KAZ)	21	9		1000
2	Park Jung-bin (KOR)	19	11		944
3	Kung Hsien-wen (TPE)	18	12		916
3	Chen Junmei (CHN)	18	12		916
5	Jeong Chang-soon (KOR)	17	13		888
5	Yu Yajuan (CHN)	17	13		888
7	Dong Lean (CHN)	16	14		860
8	Liang Caixia (CHN)	15	15		832
9	Lyudmila Shumilova (KAZ)	14	16		804
10	Galina Dolgushina (KAZ)	13	17		776
11	Goh Ae-ri (KOR)	12	18		748
11	Han Chiao-jung (TPE)	12	18		748
11	Shin Eun-mi (KOR)	12	18		748
14	Natalya Uvarova (KAZ)	10	20		692
14	Roza Bikkinina (KGZ)	10	20		692
16	Chen Yi-wen (TPE)	7	23		608

=== Swimming ===
Rank	Athlete	Time	Pen.	Points
1	Lada Jiyenbalanova (KAZ)	2:18.10		1264
2	Liang Caixia (CHN)	2:19.89		1244
3	Dong Lean (CHN)	2:20.00		1240
4	Natalya Uvarova (KAZ)	2:20.47		1236
5	Yu Yajuan (CHN)	2:22.52		1212
6	Lyudmila Shumilova (KAZ)	2:26.05		1168
7	Shin Eun-mi (KOR)	2:26.72		1160
8	Chen Yi-wen (TPE)	2:28.59		1140
9	Galina Dolgushina (KAZ)	2:29.17		1132
10	Kung Hsien-wen (TPE)	2:31.87		1100
11	Han Chiao-jung (TPE)	2:33.52		1080
12	Park Jung-bin (KOR)	2:33.83		1076
13	Goh Ae-ri (KOR)	2:33.99		1076
14	Jeong Chang-soon (KOR)	2:38.58		1020
15	Chen Junmei (CHN)	2:39.01		1012
16	Roza Bikkinina (KGZ)	2:53.68		836

=== Riding ===
Rank	Athlete	Horse	Time	Pen.	Points
1	Chen Junmei (CHN)	Swoop	1:12.52		1200
2	Roza Bikkinina (KGZ)	Soyka	1:11.67	28	1172
3	Jeong Chang-soon (KOR)	Bally Money	1:12.12	56	1144
4	Dong Lean (CHN)	Gilber	1:18.99	60	1140
5	Kung Hsien-wen (TPE)	Atoz	1:19.42	64	1136
6	Han Chiao-jung (TPE)	Tuxy Do	1:28.96	72	1128
7	Liang Caixia (CHN)	Flare	1:27.67	80	1120
8	Galina Dolgushina (KAZ)	Captain Masik	1:09.06	84	1116
9	Lada Jiyenbalanova (KAZ)	Ottaba Jack Flash	1:06.38	112	1088
10	Shin Eun-mi (KOR)	Viva	1:50.06	252	948
11	Goh Ae-ri (KOR)	Chrysler	1:47.01	288	912
12	Natalya Uvarova (KAZ)	J. Watch	1:51.73	356	844
13	Chen Yi-wen (TPE)	Daeg Gu CC	2:05.75	368	832
14	Lyudmila Shumilova (KAZ)	Angus	2:17.00	1108	92
15	Park Jung-bin (KOR)	Somersby Down	1:17.00	1180	20
16	Yu Yajuan (CHN)	P.j	2:17.00	1456	0

=== Running ===
Rank	Athlete	Time	Pen.	Points
1	Lada Jiyenbalanova (KAZ)	10:26.15		1216
2	Chen Junmei (CHN)	10:52.62		1112
3	Liang Caixia (CHN)	10:53.97		1108
4	Lyudmila Shumilova (KAZ)	10:58.67		1088
5	Dong Lean (CHN)	11:10.07		1040
6	Natalya Uvarova (KAZ)	11:22.34		992
7	Galina Dolgushina (KAZ)	11:30.82		960
8	Shin Eun-mi (KOR)	11:41.14		916
9	Jeong Chang-soon (KOR)	11:42.67		912
10	Kung Hsien-wen (TPE)	11:45.51		900
11	Goh Ae-ri (KOR)	11:46.87		896
12	Park Jung-bin (KOR)	11:48.44		888
13	Chen Yi-wen (TPE)	11:57.56		852
14	Roza Bikkinina (KGZ)	12:10.26		800
15	Han Chiao-jung (TPE)	12:57.41		612
16	Yu Yajuan (CHN)	13:13.70		548

=== Summary ===
Rank	Athlete	Shoot	Fence	Swim	Ride	Run	Total	Time
1st place, gold medalist(s)	Lada Jiyenbalanova (KAZ)	820	1000	1264	1088	1216	5388	
2nd place, silver medalist(s)	Dong Lean (CHN)	1024	860	1240	1140	1040	5304	+0:21
3rd place, bronze medalist(s)	Chen Junmei (CHN)	1036	916	1012	1200	1112	5276	+0:28
4	Kung Hsien-wen (TPE)	1072	916	1100	1136	900	5124	+1:06
5	Jeong Chang-soon (KOR)	1108	888	1020	1144	912	5072	+1:20
6	Liang Caixia (CHN)	760	832	1244	1120	1108	5064	+1:22
7	Galina Dolgushina (KAZ)	940	776	1132	1116	960	4924	+1:57
8	Natalya Uvarova (KAZ)	1060	692	1236	844	992	4824	+2:21
9	Goh Ae-ri (KOR)	1036	748	1076	912	896	4668	+3:01
10	Shin Eun-mi (KOR)	844	748	1160	948	916	4616	+3:13
11	Han Chiao-jung (TPE)	1036	748	1080	1128	612	4604	+3:16
12	Roza Bikkinina (KGZ)	1048	692	836	1172	800	4548	+3:30
13	Chen Yi-wen (TPE)	1072	608	1140	832	852	4504	+3:41
14	Lyudmila Shumilova (KAZ)	1060	804	1168	92	1088	4212	+4:55
15	Park Jung-bin (KOR)	1108	944	1076	20	888	4036	+5:38
16	Yu Yajuan (CHN)	1024	888	1212	0	548	3672	+7:10
