= Modern pentathlon at the 2002 Asian Games – Women's team =

Women's team at the 2002 Asian Games
- Venue: Changwon International Shooting Range; Changwon Evergreen Hall; Changwon Swimming Pool; Busan Equestrian Grounds; Samnak Riverside Athletic Park
- Date: 10 October 2002
- Competitors: 12 from 3 nations

Medalists
gold medal	Kazakhstan; Galina Dolgushina, Lada Jiyenbalanova, Lyudmila Shumilova, Natalya Uvarova
silver medal	China; Chen Junmei, Dong Lean, Liang Caixia, Yu Yajuan
bronze medal	South Korea; Goh Ae-ri, Jeong Chang-soon, Park Jung-bin, Shin Eun-mi

The women's team competition at the 2002 Asian Games in Busan was held on 10 October 2002.

== Schedule ==
All times are Korea Standard Time (UTC+09:00)

Date	Time	Event
Thursday, 10 October 2002	07:00	Shooting
Thursday, 10 October 2002	09:00	Fencing
Thursday, 10 October 2002	13:00	Swimming
Thursday, 10 October 2002	15:00	Riding
Thursday, 10 October 2002	18:00	Running

== Results ==
Rank	Team	Shoot	Fence	Swim	Ride	Run	Total
1st place, gold medalist(s)	Kazakhstan (KAZ)	3880	3272	4800	3140	4256	19348
	Galina Dolgushina	940	776	1132	1116	960	4924
	Lada Jiyenbalanova	820	1000	1264	1088	1216	5388
	Lyudmila Shumilova	1060	804	1168	92	1088	4212
	Natalya Uvarova	1060	692	1236	844	992	4824
2nd place, silver medalist(s)	China (CHN)	3844	3496	4708	3460	3808	19316
	Chen Junmei	1036	916	1012	1200	1112	5276
	Dong Lean	1024	860	1240	1140	1040	5304
	Liang Caixia	760	832	1244	1120	1108	5064
	Yu Yajuan	1024	888	1212	0	548	3672
3rd place, bronze medalist(s)	South Korea (KOR)	4096	3328	4332	3024	3612	18392
	Goh Ae-ri	1036	748	1076	912	896	4668
	Jeong Chang-soon	1108	888	1020	1144	912	5072
	Park Jung-bin	1108	944	1076	20	888	4036
	Shin Eun-mi	844	748	1160	948	916	4616
