= Modern pentathlon at the 2002 Asian Games – Men's relay =

Men's relay at the 2002 Asian Games
- Venue: Changwon Evergreen Hall; Changwon Swimming Pool; Busan Equestrian Grounds; Samnak Riverside Athletic Park
- Date: 13 October 2002
- Competitors: 21 from 7 nations

Medalists
gold medal	South Korea; Han Do-ryung, Jeong Tae-nam, Kim Mi-sub
silver medal	Kyrgyzstan; Andrey Hanadeyev, Mirsait Mirdjaliev, Pavel Uvarov
bronze medal	Kazakhstan; Nurzhan Kusmoldanov, Andrey Skylar, Denis Starodubtsev

The men's relay competition at the 2002 Asian Games in Busan was held on 13 October 2002.

== Schedule ==
All times are Korea Standard Time (UTC+09:00)

Date	Time	Event
Sunday, 13 October 2002	07:00	Fencing
Sunday, 13 October 2002	09:00	Swimming
Sunday, 13 October 2002	15:00	Riding
Sunday, 13 October 2002	18:00	Combined event

== Results ==
Rank	Team	Fence	Swim	Ride	Comb.	Total
1st place, gold medalist(s)	South Korea (KOR); Han Do-ryung; Jeong Tae-nam; Kim Mi-sub	928	1284	972	2984	6168
2nd place, silver medalist(s)	Kyrgyzstan (KGZ); Andrey Hanadeyev; Mirsait Mirdjaliev; Pavel Uvarov	916	1140	1104	2898	6058
3rd place, bronze medalist(s)	Kazakhstan (KAZ); Nurzhan Kusmoldanov; Andrey Skylar; Denis Starodubtsev	856	1224	1116	2618	5814
4	Uzbekistan (UZB); Arkadiy Makrushev; Vladimir Sidorov; Nikolay Vasilev	820	1152	972	2830	5774
5	China (CHN); Chen Zhaowei; Liu Yang; Qian Zhenhua	904	1296	632	2814	5646
6	Japan (JPN); Shoji Kurousu; Yoshinori Mizouchi; Hideyuki Saito	868	1312	268	2622	5070
7	Bahrain (BRN); Salman Yusuf Ali; Salah Busafar; Khalifa Hamad Khamis	748	1004	228	1366	3346
