= Modern pentathlon at the 1994 Asian Games =

- Venue: Mihara Region Plaza
- Dates: 9–11 October 1994
- Competitors: 16 from 6 nations

Modern pentathlon was one of the many sports which was held at the 1994 Asian Games in Mihara, Hiroshima, Japan on 9 to 11 October 1994.

Kim Myung-kun of South Korea won the gold medal in individual competition while Kazakhstan won the team event over South Korea and Kyrgyzstan.

== Schedule ==
●	Round	●	Last round

Event↓/Date →	9th Sun	10th Mon	11th Tue
Men's individual	●●	●●	●
Men's team	●●	●●	●

== Medalists ==
Event	Gold	Silver	Bronze
Individual	Kim Myung-kun; South Korea	Alexandr Parygin; Kazakhstan	Kim Mi-sub; South Korea
Team	Kazakhstan; Alexandr Parygin; Oleg Rebrov; Dmitriy Tyurin	South Korea; Joung Dae-sung; Kim Mi-sub; Kim Myung-kun	Kyrgyzstan; Aleksandr Chvirov; Igor Feldman; Aleksandr Poddubny

== Medal table ==
Rank	Nation	Gold	Silver	Bronze	Total
1	South Korea (KOR)	1	1	1	3
2	Kazakhstan (KAZ)	1	1	0	2
3	Kyrgyzstan (KGZ)	0	0	1	1
Totals (3 entries)		2	2	2	6

== Participating nations ==
A total of 16 athletes from 6 nations competed in modern pentathlon at the 1994 Asian Games:

- China (3)
- Japan (3)
- Kazakhstan (3)
- Kyrgyzstan (3)
- South Korea (3)
- Uzbekistan (1)
