= Modern pentathlon at the 1994 Asian Games – Men's team =

Men's team at the 1994 Asian Games
- Venue: Mihara Region Plaza
- Date: 9–11 October 1994
- Competitors: 15 from 5 nations

Medalists
gold medal	Kazakhstan; Alexandr Parygin, Oleg Rebrov, Dmitriy Tyurin
silver medal	South Korea; Joung Dae-sung, Kim Mi-sub, Kim Myung-kun
bronze medal	Kyrgyzstan; Aleksandr Chvirov, Igor Feldman, Aleksandr Poddubny

The men's team modern pentathlon competition at the 1994 Asian Games was held in Mihara, Hiroshima, Japan from 9 to 11 October 1994.

== Schedule ==
All times are Japan Standard Time (UTC+09:00)

Date	Time	Event
Sunday, 9 October 1994	09:00	Fencing
Sunday, 9 October 1994	16:00	Running
Monday, 10 October 1994	08:00	Swimming
Monday, 10 October 1994	13:00	Shooting
Tuesday, 11 October 1994	09:00	Riding

== Results ==
Rank	Team	Fence	Run	Swim	Shoot	Ride	Total
1st place, gold medalist(s)	Kazakhstan (KAZ)	2448	3189	3616	3060	3180	15493
	Alexandr Parygin	808	1027	1208	1084	1100	5227
	Oleg Rebrov	880	1093	1200	880	1100	5153
	Dmitriy Tyurin	760	1069	1208	1096	980	5113
2nd place, silver medalist(s)	South Korea (KOR)	2544	2805	3828	2964	3147	15288
	Joung Dae-sung	712	844	1224	952	1067	4799
	Kim Mi-sub	832	994	1324	1000	1010	5160
	Kim Myung-kun	1000	967	1280	1012	1070	5329
3rd place, bronze medalist(s)	Kyrgyzstan (KGZ)	2400	3159	3384	3024	3047	15014
	Aleksandr Chvirov	712	1048	1212	1036	1100	5108
	Igor Feldman	856	1087	1112	1084	907	5046
	Aleksandr Poddubny	832	1024	1060	904	1040	4860
4	China (CHN)	2280	2703	3444	2904	3122	14453
	Dong Haoyu	664	1000	1164	748	1070	4646
	Miao Kai	808	898	1204	1120	1000	5030
	Zhang Bin	808	805	1076	1036	1052	4777
5	Japan (JPN)	1896	3057	3268	2784	3240	14245
	Tatsuya Kosai	712	1135	960	832	1070	4709
	Hiroshi Miyagahara	688	1006	1084	940	1070	4788
	Takuji Yoneuji	496	916	1224	1012	1100	4748
