= Modern pentathlon at the 2000 Summer Olympics – Men's =

Modern pentathlon at the Olympics

Men's modern pentathlon at the Games of the XXVII Olympiad
- Venue: The Dome and Exhibition Complex (fencing and shooting); Sydney International Aquatic Centre (swimming); Sydney Baseball Stadium (riding and running)
- Date: 30 September
- Competitors: 24 from 19 nations
- Winning score: 5376

Medalists
1st place, gold medalist(s)		Dmitry Svatkovsky	Russia
2nd place, silver medalist(s)		Gábor Balogh	Hungary
3rd place, bronze medalist(s)		Pavel Dovgal	Belarus

The men's modern pentathlon at the 2000 Summer Olympics in Sydney was held on 30 September. Three venues were used: The Dome and Exhibition Complex (fencing and shooting), Sydney International Aquatic Centre (swimming) and Sydney Baseball Stadium (horse-riding and cross-country running). Dmitry Svatkovsky from Russia won the gold medal with a score of 5,376 points.

== Competition format ==
The modern pentathlon consisted of five events, with all five held in one day.

- Shooting: A 4.5 mm air pistol shooting (the athlete must hit 20 shots, one at each target). Score was based on the number of shots hitting at each target.
- Fencing: A round-robin, one-touch épée competition. Score was based on winning percentage.
- Swimming: A 200 m freestyle race. Score was based on time.
- Horse-riding: A show jumping competition. Score based on penalties for fallen bars, refusals, falls, and being over the time limit.
- Running: A 3 km run. Starts are staggered (based on points from first four events), so that the first to cross the finish line wins.

== Schedule ==
All times are Australian Time (UTC+10)

Date	Time	Round
Saturday, 30 September 2000	06:45	Shooting
Saturday, 30 September 2000	08:00	Fencing
Saturday, 30 September 2000	11:25	Swimming
Saturday, 30 September 2000	13:45	Riding
Saturday, 30 September 2000	16:20	Running

== Results ==
Twenty-four athletes participated.

Rank	Athlete	Country	Shooting Score (pts)	Fencing Victories (pts)	Swimming Time (pts)	Riding Penalties (pts)	Running Time (pts)	Total
1st place, gold medalist(s)	Dmitry Svatkovsky	Russia	176 (1048)	13 (880)	2:07.64 (1224)	30 (1070)	9:21.79 (1154)	5376
2nd place, silver medalist(s)	Gábor Balogh	Hungary	181 (1108)	14 (920)	2:07.90 (1221)	120 (980)	9:29.49 (1124)	5353
3rd place, bronze medalist(s)	Pavel Dovgal	Belarus	186 (1168)	10 (760)	2:04.62 (1254)	30 (1070)	9:38.75 (1086)	5338
4	Sébastien Deleigne	France	176 (1048)	13 (880)	2:11.08 (1190)	90 (1010)	9:10.69 (1198)	5326
5	Vadym Tkachuk	Ukraine	184 (1144)	12 (840)	2:16.20 (1138)	30 (1070)	9:39.86 (1082)	5274
6	Chad Senior	United States	177 (1060)	15 (960)	2:02.20 (1278)	210 (890)	9:43.45 (1068)	5256
7	Andrejus Zadneprovskis	Lithuania	174 (1000)	12 (840)	2:04.32 (1257)	145 (955)	9:14.31 (1184)	5236
8	Olivier Clergeau	France	180 (1096)	16 (1000)	2:13.71 (1163)	60 (1040)	10:20.71 (918)	5217
9	Velizar Iliev	United States	183 (1132)	13 (880)	2:08.33 (1217)	30 (1070)	10:23.18 (908)	5207
10	Georgii Tchimeris	Ukraine	183 (1132)	12 (840)	2:05.40 (1246)	148 (952)	9:55.85 (1018)	5188
11	Samuel Félix	Mexico	176 (1048)	11 (800)	2:16.31 (1137)	90 (1010)	9:17.66 (1170)	5165
12	Michael Brandt	Sweden	180 (1096)	11 (800)	2:08.23 (1218)	172 (928)	9:32.15 (1112)	5154
13	Stefano Pecci	Italy	175 (1036)	13 (880)	2:09.72 (1203)	150 (950)	9:47.35 (1052)	5121
14	Imre Tiidemann	Estonia	179 (1084)	9 (720)	2:18.05 (1120)	90 (1010)	9:23.85 (1146)	5080
15	Igor Warabida	Poland	170 (976)	10 (760)	2:11.96 (1181)	90 (1010)	9:26.97 (1134)	5061
16	Eric Walther	Germany	170 (976)	7 (640)	2:00.71 (1293)	120 (980)	9:37.91 (1090)	4979
17	Péter Sárfalvi	Hungary	174 (1024)	12 (840)	2:09.55 (1205)	262 (838)	9:44.05 (1064)	4971
18	Deniss Čerkovskis	Latvia	174 (1024)	6 (600)	2:12.04 (1180)	133 (967)	9:27.35 (1132)	4903
19	Emad El-Geziry	Egypt	165 (916)	9 (720)	2:08.61 (1214)	223 (877)	9:32.41 (1112)	4839
20	Robert McGregor	Australia	178 (1072)	7 (640)	2:18.11 (1119)	195 (905)	9:48.26 (1048)	4784
21	Nicolae Papuc	Romania	185 (1156)	11 (800)	2:10.86 (1192)	DNF (0)	9:53.89 (1026)	4174
22	Horacio de la Vega	Mexico	179 (1084)	15 (960)	2:10.37 (1197)	DNF (0)	10:50.91 (798)	4039
23	Tsanko Khantov	Bulgaria	169 (964)	9 (720)	2:07.66 (1224)	DNF (0)	9:54.15 (1024)	3932
24	Qian Zhenhua	China	179 (884)	11 (800)	2:05.05 (1250)	DNF (0)	10:24.99 (902)	3836
