= 2015 in modern pentathlon =

This article lists the main modern pentathlon events and their results for 2015.

== International modern pentathlon events ==
- July 18 & 19: 2015 Pan American Games in (Canada) Toronto
  - Individual winners: (Guatemala) Charles Fernandez (m) / (Brazil) Yane Marques (f)
- October 7 – 9: 2015 Military World Games in (South Korea) Mungyeong
  - Individual winners: (South Korea) PARK Dong-soo (m) / (Poland) Oktawia Nowacka (f)
  - Mixed Team Relay winners: Poland (Oktawia Nowacka & Jaroslaw Swiderski)
  - Men's Team winners: Russia (Ilia Frolov, Sergey Karyakin, & Oleg Naumov)
  - Women's Team winners: China (WANG Wei, YE Aonan, & WANG Xinyao)

== World modern pentathlon events ==
- June 28 – July 6: 2015 World Modern Pentathlon Championships in Berlin
  - Individual winners: (Ukraine) Pavlo Tymoshchenko (m) / (Germany) Lena Schöneborn (f)
  - Team Relay winners: Germany (Marvin Faly Dogue & Alexander Nobis) (m) / China (Chen Qian & LIANG Wanxia) (f)
  - Mixed Team Relay winners: Czech Republic (Jan Kuf & Natalie Dianová)
  - Men's Team winners: South Korea (LEE Woo-jin, JUN Woong-tae, & Jung Jin-hwa)
  - Women's Team winners: Poland (Anna Maliszewska, Aleksandra Chmielewska, & Oktawia Nowacka)
- August 2 – 10: 2015 Junior Modern Pentathlon Championships in Mexico City
  - Junior Individual winners: (Russia) Oleg Naumov (m) / (United Kingdom) Francesca Summers (f)
  - Junior Team Relay winners: South Korea (JUN Woong-tae & LEE Ji-hun) (m) / United Kingdom (Eilidh Prise & Francesca Summers) (f)
  - Junior Mixed Team Relay winners: China (LI Shuhuan & ZHONG Xiuting)
  - Junior Men's Team winners: Russia (Oleg Naumov, Viacheslav Bardyshev, & Alexander Lifanov)
  - Junior Women's Team winners: Russia (Ekaterina Vdovenko, Uliana Batashova, & Sofia Serkina)
- August 31 – September 7: 2015 World Youth "A" Modern Pentathlon Championships (Tetrathlon) in (Argentina) Buenos Aires
  - Youth Individual winners: (Russia) Serge Baranov (m) / (Turkey) Ilke Ozyuksel (f)
  - Youth Team Relay winners: Russia (Alexandr Stepachev & Serge Baranov) (m) / Germany (Rebecca Langrehr & Anna Matthes) (f)
  - Youth Mixed Team Relay winners: Egypt (Ahmed Hamed & Salma Abdelmaksoud)
  - Youth Men's Team winners: South Korea (SEO Chang-wan, PARK Woo-jin, & KIM Dae-won)
  - Youth Women's Team winners: Egypt (Salma Abdelmaksoud, Haydy Morsy, & Sondos Aboubakr)

== Continental modern pentathlon events ==
- May 25 – 31: 2015 European Junior Modern Pentathlon Championships in (Bulgaria) Sofia
  - Junior Individual winners: (Poland) Sebastian Stasiak (m) / (Belarus) Iryna Prasiantsova (f)
  - Junior Team Relay winners: Russia (Oleg Naumov & Viacheslav Bardyshev) (m) / Hungary (Rebeka Ormándi & Karolina Palkovics)
  - Junior Mixed Team Relay winners: Russia (Ekaterina Makarova & Nikolai Dudko)
  - Junior Men's Team winners: Russia (Oleg Naumov, Alexander Lifanov, & Viacheslav Bardyshev)
  - Junior Women's Team winners: Hungary (Sarolta Simon, Alexandra Boros, & Anna Zs. Toth)
- May 30 – June 6: 2015 Asia-Oceania Modern Pentathlon Championships (Olympic Qualification) in Beijing
  - Individual winners: (Australia) Max Esposito (m) / (China) Chen Qian (f)
  - Team Relay winners: South Korea (LEE Dong-gi & Hwang Woo-jin) (m) / China (Chen Qian & LIANG Wanxia) (f)
  - Mixed Team Relay winners: South Korea (Hwang Woo-jin & Kim Sun-woo)
  - Men's Team winners: South Korea (Hwang Woo-jin, Jung Jin-hwa, & JUN Woong-tae)
  - Women's Team winners: China (ZHANG Xiaonan, LIANG Wanxia, & Chen Qian)
- July 8 – 13: 2015 European Youth "A" Modern Pentathlon Championships (Tetrathlon) in (Czech Republic) Prague
  - Youth Individual winners: (Russia) Serge Baranov (m) / (Russia) Adelina Ibatullina (f)
  - Youth Team Relay winners: Russia (Alexandr Stepachev & Serge Baranov) (m) / Russia (Adelina Ibatullina & Ekaterina Utina) (f)
  - Youth Mixed Team Relay winners: Italy (Aurora Tognetti & Matteo Cicinelli)
  - Youth Men's Team winners: Russia (Serge Baranov, Andrei Petrov, & Alexandr Stepachev)
  - Youth Women's Team winners: Russia (Alena Shornikova, Xeina Fralcova, & Adelina Ibatullina)
- July 24 – 27: 2015 European Youth "B" Modern Pentathlon Championships (Tetrathlon) in (Portugal) Caldas da Rainha
  - Youth Individual winners: (Hungary) Balázs Szép (m) / (Italy) Elena Micheli (f)
  - Youth Team Relay winners: Hungary (Balázs Szép & Barnabas Burcsik) (m) / Hungary (Michelle Gulyas & Borbala Sarcia) (f)
  - Youth Mixed Team Relay winners: Great Britain (Zoe Gowers & Oliver Murray)
  - Youth Men's Team winners: Hungary (Balázs Szép, Barnabas Burcsik, & Gergo Salga)
  - Youth Women's Team winners: Hungary (Virag Kiss, Michelle Gulyas, & Borbala Sarcia)
- August 17 – 23: 2015 European Modern Pentathlon Championships (Olympic Qualification) in (United Kingdom) Bath
  - Individual winners: (Republic of Ireland) Arthur Lanigan-O'Keeffe (m) / (Lithuania) Laura Asadauskaitė (f)
  - Team Relay winners: Ukraine (Yuriy Fedechko & Dmytro Kirpulyanskyy) (m) / Germany (Lena Schöneborn & Annika Schleu) (f)
  - Mixed Team Relay winners: Italy (Valerio Grasselli & Camilla Lontano)
  - Men's Team winners: France (Valentin Belaud, Christopher Patte, & Valentin Prades)
  - Women's Team winners: Great Britain (Samantha Murray, Freyja Prentice, & Kate French)
- August 21 – 23: 2015 African Modern Pentathlon Championships (Olympic Qualification) in Cairo
  - Individual winners: (Egypt) Eslam Hamad (m) / (Egypt) Haydy Morsy (f)
  - Men's Team winners: Egypt (Yasser Hefny, Omar El Geziry, & Amro El Geziry)
  - Women's Team winners: Egypt (Haydy Morsy, Reem Yakout, & Sondos Aboubakr) (default)
- September 17 – 19: 2015 South American Modern Pentathlon Championships in (Brazil) Resende
  - Individual winners: (Chile) Esteban Bustos (m) / (Chile) Javiera Rosas (f)

== 2015 Modern Pentathlon World Cup ==
- February 18 – June 14: 2015 UIPM World Cup Schedule
  - February 18 – 23: World Cup #1 in (United States) Sarasota, Florida
    - Individual winners: (United Kingdom) James Cooke (m) / (United Kingdom) Samantha Murray (f)
    - Mixed Team Relay winners: Russia (Aleksander Lesun & Anna Buriak)
  - March 17 – 22: World Cup #2 in (Egypt) Cairo
    - Individual winners: (Latvia) Ruslan Nakonechnyi (m) / (Lithuania) Laura Asadauskaitė (f)
    - Mixed Team Relay winners: Mexico (Ismael Hernández Uscanga & Tamara Vega)
  - April 8 – 13: World Cup #3 in (Italy) Rome
    - Individual winners: (Ukraine) Pavlo Tymoshchenko (m) / (Lithuania) Laura Asadauskaitė (f)
    - Mixed Team Relay winners: South Korea (Hwang Woo-jin & Yang Soo-jin)
  - April 30 – May 4: MP World Cup #4 in Kecskemét
    - Individual winners: (France) Valentin Belaud (m) / (Hungary) Zsofia Foldhazi (f)
    - Mixed Team Relay winners: Hungary (Anna Zs. Toth & Adam Marosi)
  - June 8 – 14: MP World Cup #5 (final) in Minsk
    - Individual winners: (Italy) Riccardo de Luca (m) / (Lithuania) Laura Asadauskaitė (f)
    - Mixed Team Relay winners: Belarus (Ilya Palazkov & Katsiaryna Arol)
