= Modern pentathlon at the 2010 Asian Games – Men's individual =

Men's individual at the 2010 Asian Games
- Venue: Huangcun Sports Base; Aoti Aquatics Centre
- Date: 24 November 2010
- Competitors: 17 from 5 nations

Medalists
gold medal	Cao Zhongrong	China
silver medal	Lee Choon-huan	South Korea
bronze medal	Kim In-hong	South Korea

The men's individual modern pentathlon competition at the 2010 Asian Games in Guangzhou was held on 24 November 2010.

== Schedule ==
All times are China Standard Time (UTC+08:00)

Date	Time	Event
Wednesday, 24 November 2010	08:30	Fencing
Wednesday, 24 November 2010	11:30	Swimming
Wednesday, 24 November 2010	14:30	Riding
Wednesday, 24 November 2010	16:50	Combined event

== Results ==
=== Fencing ===
Rank	Athlete	Won	Lost	Pen.	Points
1	Lee Choon-huan (KOR)	24	8		1056
2	Hayato Noguchi (JPN)	23	9		1028
3	Cao Zhongrong (CHN)	20	12		944
3	Wang Guan (CHN)	20	12		944
5	Shinichi Tomii (JPN)	20	12	12	932
6	Kim In-hong (KOR)	19	13		916
7	Jung Hwon-ho (KOR)	17	15		860
7	Kim Ki-hyeon (KOR)	17	15		860
9	Liu Yanli (CHN)	15	17		804
9	Tomoya Miguchi (JPN)	15	17		804
11	Shinya Fujii (JPN)	13	19		748
11	Nikita Kuznetsov (KGZ)	13	19		748
11	Anton Novikov (KGZ)	13	19		748
14	Ilias Baktybekov (KGZ)	11	21		692
14	Sergey Spasov (UZB)	11	21		692
16	Xu Yunqi (CHN)	10	22		664
17	Nikolai Vedmed (KGZ)	8	24		608

=== Swimming ===
Rank	Athlete	Time	Pen.	Points
1	Cao Zhongrong (CHN)	1:59.64		1368
2	Shinichi Tomii (JPN)	2:01.09		1348
3	Tomoya Miguchi (JPN)	2:01.91		1340
4	Hayato Noguchi (JPN)	2:02.13		1336
5	Kim In-hong (KOR)	2:02.42		1332
6	Xu Yunqi (CHN)	2:02.48		1332
7	Kim Ki-hyeon (KOR)	2:03.26		1324
8	Shinya Fujii (JPN)	2:03.33		1320
9	Jung Hwon-ho (KOR)	2:06.39		1284
10	Anton Novikov (KGZ)	2:07.39		1272
11	Lee Choon-huan (KOR)	2:07.64		1272
12	Liu Yanli (CHN)	2:09.00		1252
13	Wang Guan (CHN)	2:11.36		1224
14	Ilias Baktybekov (KGZ)	2:12.05		1216
15	Sergey Spasov (UZB)	2:18.20		1144
16	Nikita Kuznetsov (KGZ)	2:19.33		1128
17	Nikolai Vedmed (KGZ)	2:22.02		1096

=== Riding ===
Rank	Athlete	Horse	Time	Penalties			Points
Rank	Athlete	Horse	Time	Jump	Time	Other	Points
1	Lee Choon-huan (KOR)	L149	1:12.50				1200
2	Wang Guan (CHN)	XIA EN	1:19.15		8		1192
3	Cao Zhongrong (CHN)	S153	1:20.74		12		1188
4	Kim In-hong (KOR)	170	1:15.86	20			1180
5	Shinichi Tomii (JPN)	T108	1:18.98	20	4		1176
6	Liu Yanli (CHN)	T106	1:15.16	40			1160
7	Nikita Kuznetsov (KGZ)	C127	1:20.22	40	12		1148
8	Hayato Noguchi (JPN)	D108	1:30.43		52		1148
9	Anton Novikov (KGZ)	V211	1:22.25	40	20		1140
10	Xu Yunqi (CHN)	T299	1:18.55	60	4		1136
11	Kim Ki-hyeon (KOR)	H177	1:17.83	100			1100
12	Tomoya Miguchi (JPN)	J68	1:27.58	60	40		1100
13	Shinya Fujii (JPN)	J214	1:24.89	180	28		992
14	Nikolai Vedmed (KGZ)	B277	1:47.08	140	120		940
15	Jung Hwon-ho (KOR)	S47	2:19.66	20	248		932
16	Sergey Spasov (UZB)	D350	2:00.76	100	172	40	888
17	Ilias Baktybekov (KGZ)	H264	1:50.20	760	132		308

=== Combined event ===
Rank	Athlete	Time	Pen.	Points
1	Kim Ki-hyeon (KOR)	11:20.04		2280
2	Cao Zhongrong (CHN)	11:23.52		2268
3	Jung Hwon-ho (KOR)	11:25.20		2260
4	Wang Guan (CHN)	11:33.81		2228
5	Tomoya Miguchi (JPN)	11:40.02		2200
6	Kim In-hong (KOR)	11:40.40		2200
7	Lee Choon-huan (KOR)	11:46.10		2176
8	Anton Novikov (KGZ)	11:47.10		2172
9	Xu Yunqi (CHN)	11:47.17		2172
10	Liu Yanli (CHN)	11:52.89		2152
11	Shinya Fujii (JPN)	11:53.03		2148
12	Shinichi Tomii (JPN)	12:13.96		2068
13	Ilias Baktybekov (KGZ)	12:24.06		2024
14	Hayato Noguchi (JPN)	12:38.42		1968
15	Nikita Kuznetsov (KGZ)	12:39.44		1964
16	Nikolai Vedmed (KGZ)	13:46.49		1696
17	Sergey Spasov (UZB)	14:24.47		1544

=== Summary ===
Rank	Athlete	Fence	Swim	Ride	Comb.	Total	Time
1st place, gold medalist(s)	Cao Zhongrong (CHN)	944	1368	1188	2268	5768	
2nd place, silver medalist(s)	Lee Choon-huan (KOR)	1056	1272	1200	2176	5704	+0:16
3rd place, bronze medalist(s)	Kim In-hong (KOR)	916	1332	1180	2200	5628	+0:35
4	Wang Guan (CHN)	944	1224	1192	2228	5588	+0:45
5	Kim Ki-hyeon (KOR)	860	1324	1100	2280	5564	+0:51
6	Shinichi Tomii (JPN)	932	1348	1176	2068	5524	+1:01
7	Hayato Noguchi (JPN)	1028	1336	1148	1968	5480	+1:12
8	Tomoya Miguchi (JPN)	804	1340	1100	2200	5444	+1:21
9	Liu Yanli (CHN)	804	1252	1160	2152	5368	+1:40
10	Jung Hwon-ho (KOR)	860	1284	932	2260	5336	+1:48
11	Anton Novikov (KGZ)	748	1272	1140	2172	5332	+1:49
12	Xu Yunqi (CHN)	664	1332	1136	2172	5304	+1:56
13	Shinya Fujii (JPN)	748	1320	992	2148	5208	+2:20
14	Nikita Kuznetsov (KGZ)	748	1128	1148	1964	4988	+3:15
15	Nikolai Vedmed (KGZ)	608	1096	940	1696	4340	+5:57
16	Sergey Spasov (UZB)	692	1144	888	1544	4268	+6:15
17	Ilias Baktybekov (KGZ)	692	1216	308	2024	4240	+6:22
