= Modern pentathlon at the 2010 Asian Games – Men's team =

Men's team at the 2010 Asian Games
- Venue: Huangcun Sports Base; Aoti Aquatics Centre
- Date: 24 November 2010
- Competitors: 16 from 4 nations

Medalists
gold medal	South Korea; Jung Hwon-ho, Kim In-hong, Kim Ki-hyeon, Lee Choon-huan
silver medal	China; Cao Zhongrong, Liu Yanli, Wang Guan, Xu Yunqi
bronze medal	Japan; Shinya Fujii, Tomoya Miguchi, Hayato Noguchi, Shinichi Tomii

The men's team modern pentathlon competition at the 2010 Asian Games in Guangzhou was held on 24 November 2010.

== Schedule ==
All times are China Standard Time (UTC+08:00)

Date	Time	Event
Wednesday, 24 November 2010	08:30	Fencing
Wednesday, 24 November 2010	11:30	Swimming
Wednesday, 24 November 2010	14:30	Riding
Wednesday, 24 November 2010	16:50	Combined event

== Results ==
Rank	Team	Fence	Swim	Ride	Comb.	Total
1st place, gold medalist(s)	South Korea (KOR)	3692	5212	4412	8916	22232
	Jung Hwon-ho	860	1284	932	2260	5336
	Kim In-hong	916	1332	1180	2200	5628
	Kim Ki-hyeon	860	1324	1100	2280	5564
	Lee Choon-huan	1056	1272	1200	2176	5704
2nd place, silver medalist(s)	China (CHN)	3356	5176	4676	8820	22028
	Cao Zhongrong	944	1368	1188	2268	5768
	Liu Yanli	804	1252	1160	2152	5368
	Wang Guan	944	1224	1192	2228	5588
	Xu Yunqi	664	1332	1136	2172	5304
3rd place, bronze medalist(s)	Japan (JPN)	3512	5344	4416	8384	21656
	Shinya Fujii	748	1320	992	2148	5208
	Tomoya Miguchi	804	1340	1100	2200	5444
	Hayato Noguchi	1028	1336	1148	1968	5480
	Shinichi Tomii	932	1348	1176	2068	5524
4	Kyrgyzstan (KGZ)	2796	4712	3536	7856	18900
	Ilias Baktybekov	692	1216	308	2024	4240
	Nikita Kuznetsov	748	1128	1148	1964	4988
	Anton Novikov	748	1272	1140	2172	5332
	Nikolai Vedmed	608	1096	940	1696	4340
