= Modern pentathlon at the 1996 Summer Olympics =

Men's modern pentathlon at the Games of the XXVI Olympiad
- Venue: Georgia Tech Aquatic Center (swimming); Georgia World Congress Center (fencing & shooting); Georgia International Horse Park (running & riding)
- Dates: 30 July 1996
- Competitors: 32 from 22 nations

Medalists
| 1st place, gold medalist(s) | | Alexander Parygin | Kazakhstan |
| 2nd place, silver medalist(s) | | Eduard Zenovka | Russia |
| 3rd place, bronze medalist(s) | | János Martinek | Hungary |

Modern pentathlon at the 1996 Summer Olympics. Only an individual competition was held; the team event was removed by the International Olympic Committee after the previous games. The competition was significantly changed compared to 1992, with athletes now competing over a single day instead of 4–6 days to generate more fan interest.

== Final results ==
| Pos | Athlete | NOC | Rid. | Fen. | Sho. | Swi. | Run. | Score |
| 1 | Alexander Parygin | KAZ | 1072 | 970 | 1196 | 1040 | 1273 | 5551 |
| 2 | Eduard Zenovka | RUS | 1084 | 820 | 1268 | 1016 | 1342 | 5530 |
| 3 | János Martinek | HUN | 1000 | 910 | 1248 | 1100 | 1243 | 5501 |
| 4 | Dmitri Svatkovskiy | RUS | 1012 | 880 | 1248 | 1010 | 1339 | 5489 |
| 5 | Igor Warabida | POL | 1072 | 790 | 1208 | 1100 | 1282 | 5452 |
| 6 | Ákos Hanzély | HUN | 1084 | 940 | 1236 | 947 | 1228 | 5435 |
| 7 | Imre Tiidemann | EST | 1144 | 820 | 1212 | 950 | 1288 | 5414 |
| 8 | Cesare Toraldo | ITA | 1108 | 880 | 1296 | 1040 | 1078 | 5402 |
| 9 | Sergio Salazar | MEX | 976 | 880 | 1272 | 992 | 1267 | 5387 |
| 10 | Per-Olov Danielsson | SWE | 1048 | 850 | 1236 | 1037 | 1204 | 5375 |
| 11 | Kim Mi-seop | KOR | 976 | 910 | 1312 | 1010 | 1159 | 5367 |
| 12 | Christophe Ruer | FRA | 1060 | 790 | 1304 | 965 | 1244 | 5363 |
| 13 | Andrejus Zadneprovskis | LTU | 892 | 840 | 1276 | 1070 | 1285 | 5363 |
| 14 | Adrian Toader | ROM | 1132 | 700 | 1304 | 950 | 1249 | 5335 |
| 15 | Claud Cloete | RSA | 1132 | 780 | 1152 | 1070 | 1174 | 5308 |
| 16 | Michael Gostigian | USA | 976 | 790 | 1304 | 1043 | 1192 | 5305 |
| 17 | Fabio Nebuloni | ITA | 1096 | 820 | 1164 | 1010 | 1195 | 5285 |
| 18 | Richard Phelps | GBR | 928 | 760 | 1280 | 1100 | 1186 | 5254 |
| 19 | Manuel Barroso | POR | 988 | 670 | 1248 | 1070 | 1270 | 5246 |
| 20 | Vakhtang Iagorashvili | GEO | 952 | 940 | 1312 | 890 | 1132 | 5226 |
| 21 | Péter Sárfalvi | HUN | 1036 | 820 | 1288 | 938 | 1114 | 5196 |
| 22 | Vjacheslavs Duhanovs | LAT | 1012 | 790 | 1248 | 950 | 1186 | 5186 |
| 23 | Horacio de la Vega | MEX | 1060 | 700 | 1292 | 920 | 1210 | 5182 |
| 24 | Heorhiy Chymerys | UKR | 1012 | 970 | 1276 | 890 | 1006 | 5154 |
| 25 | Alessandro Conforto | ITA | 1120 | 880 | 1136 | 884 | 1108 | 5128 |
| 26 | Sebastien Deleigne | FRA | 1072 | 730 | 1196 | 926 | 1147 | 5071 |
| 27 | Maciej Czyżowicz | POL | 1048 | 700 | 1260 | 905 | 1108 | 5021 |
| 28 | Grigory Bremel | RUS | 940 | 850 | 1140 | 950 | 928 | 4808 |
| 29 | Philipp Waeffler | SUI | 1156 | 570 | 1200 | 860 | 988 | 4774 |
| 30 | Igor Feldman | KGZ | 976 | 640 | 1080 | 890 | 961 | 4547 |
| 31 | Dmitry Tyurin | KAZ | 1048 | 640 | 1232 | ELI | 958 | 3878 |
| 32 | Alexander Johnson | AUS | 1144 | 640 | 1300 | 613 | DNS | 3697 |
