= Modern pentathlon at the 2002 Asian Games – Women's relay =

Women's relay at the 2002 Asian Games
- Venue: Changwon Evergreen Hall; Changwon Swimming Pool; Busan Equestrian Grounds; Samnak Riverside Athletic Park
- Date: 12 October 2002
- Competitors: 12 from 4 nations

Medalists
gold medal	South Korea; Jeong Chang-soon, Park Jung-bin, Shin Eun-mi
silver medal	China; Chen Junmei, Dong Lean, Wang Yan
bronze medal	Kazakhstan; Lada Jiyenbalanova, Lyudmila Shumilova, Natalya Uvarova

The women's relay competition at the 2002 Asian Games in Busan was held on 12 October 2002.

== Schedule ==
All times are Korea Standard Time (UTC+09:00)

Date	Time	Event
Saturday, 12 October 2002	07:00	Fencing
Saturday, 12 October 2002	09:00	Swimming
Saturday, 12 October 2002	15:00	Riding
Saturday, 12 October 2002	18:00	Combined event

== Results ==
Rank	Team	Fence	Swim	Ride	Comb.	Total
1st place, gold medalist(s)	South Korea (KOR); Jeong Chang-soon; Park Jung-bin; Shin Eun-mi	976	1068	1116	2880	6040
2nd place, silver medalist(s)	China (CHN); Chen Junmei; Dong Lean; Wang Yan	808	1168	1036	2950	5962
3rd place, bronze medalist(s)	Kazakhstan (KAZ); Lada Jiyenbalanova; Lyudmila Shumilova; Natalya Uvarova	868	1180	1104	2412	5564
4	Chinese Taipei (TPE); Chen Yi-wen; Han Chiao-jung; Kung Hsien-wen	796	1060	148	2412	4416
