= Shohei Iwamoto =

Japanese modern pentathlete (born 1989)

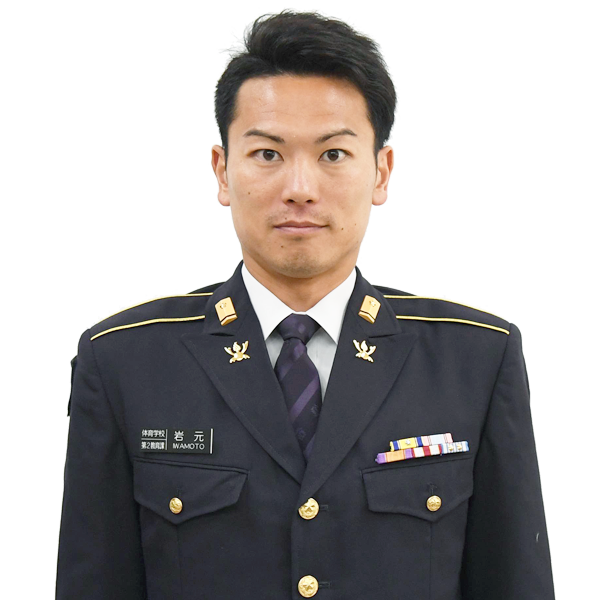

Personal information
- Born: 23 August 1989 (age 36) Saitama, Japan

Sport
- Country: Japan
- Sport: Modern pentathlon

Achievements and titles
- Olympic finals: 2016, 2020
- Regional finals: 2014, 2018
Medal record
Men's modern pentathlon
Representing Japan
Asian Games
Silver medal – second place	2014 Incheon	Team
Bronze medal – third place	2014 Incheon	Individual

Shohei Iwamoto (岩元 勝平, Iwamoto Shōhei; born 23 August 1989) is a Japanese modern pentathlete.

He won an individual bronze medal and a silver team medal in modern pentathlon at the 2014 Asian Games. He competed at the 2016 Summer Olympics in Rio de Janeiro, in the men's event and also represented Japan at the 2020 Summer Olympics in Tokyo.

== Career ==
Starting his sports career as a swimmer, Iwamoto was recruited to modern pentathlon in 2008. He won his first Japanese national championship in modern pentathlon in 2012, and further won the Japanese championship three times.

His international achievements include winning a bronze medal in the men's individual at the 2014 Asian Games, behind Guo Jianli and Jung Jin-hwa. He also won a silver medal in men's team with the Japanese team at the same games. He represented Japan at the 2016 Summer Olympics in Rio de Janeiro, where he won the initial show jumping event but placed 29th overall in the men's event. In November 2017 Iwamoto won the 57th Modern Pentathlon All Japan Championship, which was held in the Chiba Prefecture. Being somewhat behind after the first event (swimming), he advanced to second place after the second event (fencing). After the laser run and equestrian event he finished with the highest score, two points ahead of Ono who finished second. Competing in the Modern Pentathlon World Cup, his best achievement in 2018 was sixth place in the competition in Los Angeles in April. At the 2018 Asian Games he placed 8th overall in men's individual.

He qualified for the 2020 Summer Olympics by placing seventh in the Asian-Oceania Championship, and being the highest placed from Japan. In an interview from April 2020, Iwomoto tells about his sports career so far, explains the competition format of modern pentathlon in detail, and answers questions about his goals for the Tokyo Olympics. Being featured in a presentation ahead of the 2020 Summer Olympics, he expressed hope for better achievements than in Rio. A courtesy visit by Iwamoto to Governor Shioda of the Kagoshima Prefecture ahead of the Olympics attracted enough interest to merit media coverage. Competing for Japan at the 2020 Summer Olympics in Tokyo in 2021, he placed 28th in men's individual.
