= Clergeau =

Clergeau is a surname. Notable people with the surname include:

- Christophe Clergeau (born 1968), French politician
- Marie-Françoise Clergeau (born 1948), French politician
- Olivier Clergeau (born 1969), French modern pentathlete

== See also ==
- Clergoux
