= Pavel Uvarov =

Pavel Uvarov can refer to:

- Pavel Uvarov (badminton) (born 1967), Russian badminton player
- Pavel Uvarov (pentathlete) (born 1971), Kyrgyzstani modern pentathlete
