= Modern pentathlon at the 2010 Asian Games – Women's team =

Women's team at the 2010 Asian Games
- Venue: Huangcun Sports Base; Aoti Aquatics Centre
- Date: 23 November 2010
- Competitors: 12 from 3 nations

Medalists
gold medal	China; Chen Qian, Miao Yihua, Wu Yanyan, Zhang Ye
silver medal	South Korea; Choi Min-ji, Kim Eun-byeol, Mun Ye-rin, Yang Soo-jin
bronze medal	Kazakhstan; Xeniya Alexandrova, Galina Dolgushina, Lada Jiyenbalanova, Anna Shondina

The women's team modern pentathlon competition at the 2010 Asian Games in Guangzhou was held on 23 November 2010.

== Schedule ==
All times are China Standard Time (UTC+08:00)

Date	Time	Event
Tuesday, 23 November 2010	08:30	Fencing
Tuesday, 23 November 2010	11:30	Swimming
Tuesday, 23 November 2010	14:30	Riding
Tuesday, 23 November 2010	17:20	Combined event

== Results ==
Rank	Team	Fence	Swim	Ride	Comb.	Total
1st place, gold medalist(s)	China (CHN)	3636	4180	3992	7820	19628
	Chen Qian	972	1124	628	1984	4708
	Miao Yihua	1000	1152	1200	1888	5240
	Wu Yanyan	832	960	1192	1968	4952
	Zhang Ye	832	944	972	1980	4728
2nd place, silver medalist(s)	South Korea (KOR)	3216	4624	4348	6100	18288
	Choi Min-ji	776	1196	932	1568	4472
	Kim Eun-byeol	692	1148	1144	1652	4636
	Mun Ye-rin	832	1124	1092	1256	4304
	Yang Soo-jin	916	1156	1180	1624	4876
3rd place, bronze medalist(s)	Kazakhstan (KAZ)	3316	3940	2928	4332	14516
	Xeniya Alexandrova	804	892	956	1608	4260
	Galina Dolgushina	804	972	808	0	2584
	Lada Jiyenbalanova	932	1100	0	1228	3260
	Anna Shondina	776	976	1164	1496	4412
