= Cesare Toraldo =

Italian modern pentathlete (born 1963)

Personal information
- Nationality: Italian
- Born: 6 July 1963 (age 61); Rome, Italy

Sport
- Sport: Modern pentathlon

Cesare Toraldo (born 6 July 1963) is an Italian modern pentathlete. He competed in the men's individual event at the 1996 Summer Olympics.
