= Philipp Waeffler =

Swiss modern pentathlete

Personal information
- Nationality: Swiss
- Born: 14 August 1971 (age 53); Schaffhausen, Switzerland

Sport
- Sport: Modern pentathlon

Philipp Waeffler (born 14 August 1971) is a Swiss modern pentathlete. He competed in the men's individual event at the 1996 Summer Olympics.
