= Igor Warabida =

Polish modern pentathlete

Personal information
- Born: 13 January 1975 (age 50); Warsaw, Poland

Sport
- Country: Poland
- Sport: Modern pentathlon

Igor Warabida (born 13 January 1975) is a Polish modern pentathlete. He represented Poland at the 1996 Summer Olympics held in Atlanta, United States in the modern pentathlon event. He finished in 5th place.

He also represented Poland at the 2000 Summer Olympics held in Sydney, Australia in the men's modern pentathlon and he finished in 15th place.
