= Alessandro Conforto =

Italian modern pentathlete (born 1965)

Personal information
- Nationality: Italian
- Born: 18 October 1965 (age 59); Rome, Italy

Sport
- Sport: Modern pentathlon

Alessandro Conforto (born 18 October 1965) is an Italian modern pentathlete. He competed in the men's individual event at the 1996 Summer Olympics.
