= Modern pentathlon at the 2014 Asian Games – Men's individual =

Men's individual at the 2014 Asian Games
- Venue: Dream Park
- Date: 3 October 2014
- Competitors: 22 from 6 nations

Medalists
gold medal	Guo Jianli	China
silver medal	Jung Jin-hwa	South Korea
bronze medal	Shohei Iwamoto	Japan

The men's individual modern pentathlon competition at the 2014 Asian Games in Incheon was held on 3 October 2014.

== Schedule ==
All times are Korea Standard Time (UTC+09:00)

Date	Time	Event
Friday, 3 October 2014	08:30	Fencing
Friday, 3 October 2014	11:45	Swimming
Friday, 3 October 2014	13:50	Riding
Friday, 3 October 2014	16:00	Combined event

== Results ==
Legend

- EL — Eliminated

=== Fencing ===
Rank	Athlete	Won	Lost	Pen.	Points
1	Guo Jianli (CHN)	29	13		250
2	Pavel Ilyashenko (KAZ)	28	14		245
3	Temirlan Aitimbetov (KGZ)	27	15		240
4	Han Jiahao (CHN)	25	17		230
4	Su Haihang (CHN)	25	17		230
4	Jung Hwon-ho (KOR)	25	17		230
7	Shohei Iwamoto (JPN)	24	18		225
7	Jung Jin-hwa (KOR)	24	18		225
9	Lee Woo-jin (KOR)	23	19		220
9	Hwang Woo-jin (KOR)	23	19		220
11	Shinya Fujii (JPN)	21	21		210
11	Andrey Soldatov (KAZ)	21	21		210
13	Nikita Kuznetsov (KGZ)	20	22		205
14	Tomoya Miguchi (JPN)	19	23		200
15	Yuzuru Okubo (JPN)	18	24		195
15	Rustem Sabirkhuzin (KAZ)	18	24		195
15	Vladislav Sukharev (KAZ)	18	24		195
18	Zhang Linbin (CHN)	17	25		190
18	Daniiar Baktybekov (KGZ)	17	25		190
20	Tilek Talaibekov (KGZ)	16	26		185
21	Sergey Spasov (UZB)	13	29		170
22	Yuriy Galushko (UZB)	7	35		140

=== Swimming ===
Rank	Athlete	Time	Pen.	Points
1	Han Jiahao (CHN)	1:59.14		343
2	Lee Woo-jin (KOR)	1:59.65		342
3	Hwang Woo-jin (KOR)	2:00.35		339
4	Jung Jin-hwa (KOR)	2:00.61		339
5	Su Haihang (CHN)	2:02.06		334
6	Vladislav Sukharev (KAZ)	2:02.74		332
7	Guo Jianli (CHN)	2:03.20		331
8	Yuzuru Okubo (JPN)	2:03.77		329
9	Tomoya Miguchi (JPN)	2:04.11		328
10	Pavel Ilyashenko (KAZ)	2:06.24		322
11	Shinya Fujii (JPN)	2:06.36		321
12	Jung Hwon-ho (KOR)	2:06.49		321
13	Andrey Soldatov (KAZ)	2:08.04		316
14	Zhang Linbin (CHN)	2:08.09		316
15	Shohei Iwamoto (JPN)	2:08.14		316
16	Temirlan Aitimbetov (KGZ)	2:11.13		307
17	Daniiar Baktybekov (KGZ)	2:13.06		301
18	Rustem Sabirkhuzin (KAZ)	2:15.28		295
19	Nikita Kuznetsov (KGZ)	2:15.90		293
20	Sergey Spasov (UZB)	2:19.52		282
21	Yuriy Galushko (UZB)	2:19.81		281
22	Tilek Talaibekov (KGZ)	2:22.83		272

=== Riding ===
Rank	Athlete	Horse	Time	Penalties		Points
Rank	Athlete	Horse	Time	Jump	Time	Points
1	Shohei Iwamoto (JPN)	Urano	1:06.11		3	297
2	Temirlan Aitimbetov (KGZ)	Ladori	1:08.58		5	295
3	Jung Jin-hwa (KOR)	Chockper	1:03.38	7		293
4	Zhang Linbin (CHN)	Karsen	1:01.93	7		293
5	Andrey Soldatov (KAZ)	International	1:01.84	7		293
6	Shinya Fujii (JPN)	Chiantee	1:10.02		7	293
7	Tomoya Miguchi (JPN)	Countryman	1:11.83		8	292
8	Han Jiahao (CHN)	Luka Boy	1:06.13	7	3	290
9	Guo Jianli (CHN)	Bambam	1:00.42	14		286
10	Tilek Talaibekov (KGZ)	Charles	59.79	21		279
11	Hwang Woo-jin (KOR)	Lonza	1:04.73	21	1	278
12	Lee Woo-jin (KOR)	Limaro	1:11.76	24	8	268
13	Rustem Sabirkhuzin (KAZ)	Churchill	1:11.45	31	8	261
14	Su Haihang (CHN)	Jampano	1:14.13	28	11	261
15	Daniiar Baktybekov (KGZ)	Kodalmae	1:17.80	28	14	258
16	Yuzuru Okubo (JPN)	Nabu	1:28.16	24	25	251
17	Pavel Ilyashenko (KAZ)	Lechamp	1:06.36	52	3	245
18	Yuriy Galushko (UZB)	Checky	1:16.86	42	13	245
19	Sergey Spasov (UZB)	Lets go	1:40.59	58	37	205
—	Nikita Kuznetsov (KGZ)	Kalua	EL			0
—	Jung Hwon-ho (KOR)	Olgas	EL			0
—	Vladislav Sukharev (KAZ)	Galaxy	EL			0

=== Combined event ===
Rank	Athlete	Time	Pen.	Points
1	Vladislav Sukharev (KAZ)	11:43.65		597
2	Jung Hwon-ho (KOR)	11:49.05		591
3	Pavel Ilyashenko (KAZ)	11:54.05		586
4	Jung Jin-hwa (KOR)	11:54.84		586
5	Shohei Iwamoto (JPN)	11:55.32		585
6	Guo Jianli (CHN)	11:56.95		584
7	Andrey Soldatov (KAZ)	11:59.91		581
8	Hwang Woo-jin (KOR)	12:11.38		569
9	Lee Woo-jin (KOR)	12:14.02		566
10	Rustem Sabirkhuzin (KAZ)	12:17.10		563
11	Su Haihang (CHN)	12:18.51		562
12	Daniiar Baktybekov (KGZ)	12:19.19		561
13	Zhang Linbin (CHN)	12:20.43		560
14	Temirlan Aitimbetov (KGZ)	12:22.42		558
15	Shinya Fujii (JPN)	12:23.11		557
16	Tilek Talaibekov (KGZ)	12:24.08		556
17	Tomoya Miguchi (JPN)	12:24.76		556
18	Han Jiahao (CHN)	12:29.55		551
19	Yuzuru Okubo (JPN)	12:32.23		548
20	Nikita Kuznetsov (KGZ)	12:53.27		527
21	Sergey Spasov (UZB)	13:15.38		505
22	Yuriy Galushko (UZB)	13:54.90		466

=== Summary ===
Rank	Athlete	Fence	Swim	Ride	Comb.	Total	Time
1st place, gold medalist(s)	Guo Jianli (CHN)	250	331	286	584	1451	
2nd place, silver medalist(s)	Jung Jin-hwa (KOR)	225	339	293	586	1443	+0:08
3rd place, bronze medalist(s)	Shohei Iwamoto (JPN)	225	316	297	585	1423	+0:28
4	Han Jiahao (CHN)	230	343	290	551	1414	+0:37
5	Hwang Woo-jin (KOR)	220	339	278	569	1406	+0:45
6	Temirlan Aitimbetov (KGZ)	240	307	295	558	1400	+0:51
7	Andrey Soldatov (KAZ)	210	316	293	581	1400	+0:51
8	Pavel Ilyashenko (KAZ)	245	322	245	586	1398	+0:53
9	Lee Woo-jin (KOR)	220	342	268	566	1396	+0:55
10	Su Haihang (CHN)	230	334	261	562	1387	+1:04
11	Shinya Fujii (JPN)	210	321	293	557	1381	+1:10
12	Tomoya Miguchi (JPN)	200	328	292	556	1376	+1:15
13	Zhang Linbin (CHN)	190	316	293	560	1359	+1:32
14	Yuzuru Okubo (JPN)	195	329	251	548	1323	+2:08
15	Rustem Sabirkhuzin (KAZ)	195	295	261	563	1314	+2:17
16	Daniiar Baktybekov (KGZ)	190	301	258	561	1310	+2:21
17	Tilek Talaibekov (KGZ)	185	272	279	556	1292	+2:39
18	Sergey Spasov (UZB)	170	282	205	505	1162	+4:49
19	Jung Hwon-ho (KOR)	230	321	0	591	1142	+5:09
20	Yuriy Galushko (UZB)	140	281	245	466	1132	+5:19
21	Vladislav Sukharev (KAZ)	195	332	0	597	1124	+5:27
22	Nikita Kuznetsov (KGZ)	205	293	0	527	1025	+7:06
