= Ákos Hanzély =

Hungarian modern pentathlete

Personal information
- Nationality: Hungarian
- Born: 26 April 1969 (age 56) Budapest, Hungary

Sport
- Sport: Modern pentathlon

Ákos Hanzély (born 26 April 1969) is a Hungarian modern pentathlete. He competed in the men's individual event at the 1996 Summer Olympics.
