= Vadym Tkachuk =

Ukrainian modern pentathlete

Personal information
- Nationality: Ukrainian
- Born: 9 March 1970 (age 55)

Sport
- Sport: Modern pentathlon

Vadym Tkachuk (born 9 March 1970) is a Ukrainian modern pentathlete. He competed in the men's individual event at the 2000 Summer Olympics.
