= Michael Brandt (pentathlete) =

Swedish modern pentathlete

Personal information
- Nationality: Swedish
- Born: 27 June 1976 (age 48); Stockholm, Sweden

Sport
- Sport: Modern pentathlon

Michael Brandt (born 27 June 1976) is a Swedish modern pentathlete. He competed in the men's individual event at the 2000 Summer Olympics.
