= Modern pentathlon at the 2010 Asian Games – Women's individual =

Women's individual at the 2010 Asian Games
- Venue: Huangcun Sports Base; Aoti Aquatics Centre
- Date: 23 November 2010
- Competitors: 16 from 6 nations

Medalists
gold medal	Miao Yihua	China
silver medal	Wu Yanyan	China
bronze medal	Yang Soo-jin	South Korea

The women's individual modern pentathlon competition at the 2010 Asian Games in Guangzhou was held on 23 November 2010.

== Schedule ==
All times are China Standard Time (UTC+08:00)

Date	Time	Event
Tuesday, 23 November 2010	08:30	Fencing
Tuesday, 23 November 2010	11:30	Swimming
Tuesday, 23 November 2010	14:30	Riding
Tuesday, 23 November 2010	17:20	Combined event

== Results ==
Legend

- DNS — Did not start

=== Fencing ===
Rank	Athlete	Won	Lost	Pen.	Points
1	Miao Yihua (CHN)	21	9		1000
2	Chen Qian (CHN)	20	10		972
3	Lada Jiyenbalanova (KAZ)	19	11	12	932
4	Yang Soo-jin (KOR)	18	12		916
5	Wu Yanyan (CHN)	15	15		832
5	Zhang Ye (CHN)	15	15		832
5	Narumi Kurosu (JPN)	15	15		832
5	Mun Ye-rin (KOR)	15	15		832
9	Hitomi Seki (JPN)	14	16		804
9	Xeniya Alexandrova (KAZ)	14	16		804
9	Galina Dolgushina (KAZ)	14	16		804
12	Anna Shondina (KAZ)	13	17		776
12	Choi Min-ji (KOR)	13	17		776
14	Valentina Nagornaia (KGZ)	12	18	12	736
15	Kim Eun-byeol (KOR)	10	20		692
16	Ekaterina Katrenko (UZB)	5	25		552

=== Swimming ===
Rank	Athlete	Time	Pen.	Points
1	Choi Min-ji (KOR)	2:13.82		1196
2	Yang Soo-jin (KOR)	2:17.01		1156
3	Miao Yihua (CHN)	2:17.52		1152
4	Kim Eun-byeol (KOR)	2:17.66		1148
5	Narumi Kurosu (JPN)	2:19.55		1128
6	Mun Ye-rin (KOR)	2:19.77		1124
7	Chen Qian (CHN)	2:19.91		1124
8	Lada Jiyenbalanova (KAZ)	2:21.89		1100
9	Hitomi Seki (JPN)	2:22.71		1088
10	Valentina Nagornaia (KGZ)	2:23.04		1084
11	Anna Shondina (KAZ)	2:32.13		976
12	Galina Dolgushina (KAZ)	2:32.44		972
13	Wu Yanyan (CHN)	2:33.34		960
14	Zhang Ye (CHN)	2:34.82		944
15	Xeniya Alexandrova (KAZ)	2:39.00		892
16	Ekaterina Katrenko (UZB)	3:02.82		608

=== Riding ===
Rank	Athlete	Horse	Time	Penalties			Points
Rank	Athlete	Horse	Time	Jump	Time	Other	Points
1	Miao Yihua (CHN)	XIA EN	1:14.63				1200
2	Wu Yanyan (CHN)	L149	1:19.99		8		1192
3	Yang Soo-jin (KOR)	J68	1:15.04	20			1180
4	Anna Shondina (KAZ)	T108	1:26.51		36		1164
5	Kim Eun-byeol (KOR)	D350	1:31.77		56		1144
6	Narumi Kurosu (JPN)	V211	1:26.11	60	36		1104
7	Mun Ye-rin (KOR)	T299	1:24.20	80	28		1092
8	Zhang Ye (CHN)	B386	1:44.30	80	108	40	972
9	Xeniya Alexandrova (KAZ)	170	1:23.36	20	24	200	956
10	Choi Min-ji (KOR)	T106	1:54.36	120	148		932
11	Hitomi Seki (JPN)	C127	2:05.76	80	192	40	888
12	Galina Dolgushina (KAZ)	D252	1:35.03	320	72		808
13	Chen Qian (CHN)	E316	2:30.00	280	292		628
14	Lada Jiyenbalanova (KAZ)	E278	DNS				0
14	Valentina Nagornaia (KGZ)	D108	DNS				0
14	Ekaterina Katrenko (UZB)	H177	DNS				0

=== Combined event ===
Rank	Athlete	Time	Pen.	Points
1	Chen Qian (CHN)	12:34.65		1984
2	Zhang Ye (CHN)	12:35.12		1980
3	Wu Yanyan (CHN)	12:38.66		1968
4	Miao Yihua (CHN)	12:58.83		1888
5	Kim Eun-byeol (KOR)	13:57.61		1652
6	Narumi Kurosu (JPN)	14:00.62		1640
7	Yang Soo-jin (KOR)	14:04.61		1624
8	Xeniya Alexandrova (KAZ)	14:08.53		1608
9	Choi Min-ji (KOR)	14:18.11		1568
10	Anna Shondina (KAZ)	14:36.90		1496
11	Hitomi Seki (JPN)	15:34.44		1264
12	Mun Ye-rin (KOR)	15:36.45		1256
13	Lada Jiyenbalanova (KAZ)	15:43.07		1228
14	Valentina Nagornaia (KGZ)	15:48.05		1208
15	Ekaterina Katrenko (UZB)	19:23.10		348
16	Galina Dolgushina (KAZ)	DNS		0

=== Summary ===
Rank	Athlete	Fence	Swim	Ride	Comb.	Total	Time
1st place, gold medalist(s)	Miao Yihua (CHN)	1000	1152	1200	1888	5240	
2nd place, silver medalist(s)	Wu Yanyan (CHN)	832	960	1192	1968	4952	+1:12
3rd place, bronze medalist(s)	Yang Soo-jin (KOR)	916	1156	1180	1624	4876	+1:31
4	Zhang Ye (CHN)	832	944	972	1980	4728	+2:08
5	Chen Qian (CHN)	972	1124	628	1984	4708	+2:13
6	Narumi Kurosu (JPN)	832	1128	1104	1640	4704	+2:14
7	Kim Eun-byeol (KOR)	692	1148	1144	1652	4636	+2:31
8	Choi Min-ji (KOR)	776	1196	932	1568	4472	+3:12
9	Anna Shondina (KAZ)	776	976	1164	1496	4412	+3:27
10	Mun Ye-rin (KOR)	832	1124	1092	1256	4304	+3:54
11	Xeniya Alexandrova (KAZ)	804	892	956	1608	4260	+4:05
12	Hitomi Seki (JPN)	804	1088	888	1264	4044	+4:59
13	Lada Jiyenbalanova (KAZ)	932	1100	0	1228	3260	+8:15
14	Valentina Nagornaia (KGZ)	736	1084	0	1208	3028	+9:13
15	Galina Dolgushina (KAZ)	804	972	808	0	2584	
16	Ekaterina Katrenko (UZB)	552	608	0	348	1508	+15:33
