= Adrian Toader (pentathlete) =

Romanian modern pentathlete

Personal information
- Nationality: Romanian
- Born: 24 May 1972 (age 52)

Sport
- Sport: Modern pentathlon

Adrian Toader (born 24 May 1972) is a Romanian modern pentathlete. He competed in the men's individual event at the 1996 Summer Olympics.
