= Fabio Nebuloni =

Italian modern pentathlete (born 1969)

Personal information
- Nationality: Italian
- Born: 28 February 1969 (age 56); Busto Arsizio, Italy

Sport
- Sport: Modern pentathlon

Fabio Nebuloni (born 28 February 1969) is an Italian modern pentathlete. He competed in the men's individual event at the 1996 Summer Olympics.
