= Grigory Bremel =

Russian modern pentathlete

Personal information
- Nationality: Russian
- Born: 10 April 1968 (age 56)

Sport
- Sport: Modern pentathlon

Grigory Bremel (born 10 April 1968) is a Russian modern pentathlete. He competed in the men's individual event at the 1996 Summer Olympics.
