= Robert McGregor (pentathlete) =

Australian modern pentathlete

Personal information
- Nationality: Australian
- Born: 16 June 1972 (age 53) Brisbane, Australia

Sport
- Sport: Modern pentathlon

Robert McGregor (born 16 June 1972) is an Australian modern pentathlete. He competed in the men's individual event at the 2000 Summer Olympics.
