= Claud Cloete =

South African modern pentathlete

Personal information
- Nationality: South African
- Born: 17 February 1970 (age 55)

Sport
- Sport: Modern pentathlon

Claud Cloete (born 17 February 1970) is a South African modern pentathlete. He competed in the men's individual event at the 1996 Summer Olympics.
