= Modern pentathlon at the 2014 Asian Games – Men's team =

Men's team at the 2014 Asian Games
- Venue: Dream Park
- Date: 3 October 2014
- Competitors: 20 from 5 nations

Medalists
| gold medal | China; Guo Jianli, Han Jiahao, Su Haihang, Zhang Linbin |
| silver medal | Japan; Shinya Fujii, Shohei Iwamoto, Tomoya Miguchi, Yuzuru Okubo |
| bronze medal | South Korea; Hwang Woo-jin, Jung Hwon-ho, Jung Jin-hwa, Lee Woo-jin |

The men's team modern pentathlon competition at the 2014 Asian Games in Incheon was held on 3 October 2014.

== Schedule ==
All times are Korea Standard Time (UTC+09:00)

| Date | Time | Event |
|---|---|---|
| Friday, 3 October 2014 | 08:30 | Fencing |
| Friday, 3 October 2014 | 11:45 | Swimming |
| Friday, 3 October 2014 | 13:50 | Riding |
| Friday, 3 October 2014 | 16:00 | Combined event |

== Results ==
| Rank | Team | Fence | Swim | Ride | Comb. | Total |
|---|---|---|---|---|---|---|
| 1st place, gold medalist(s) | China (CHN) | 900 | 1324 | 1130 | 2257 | 5611 |
| | Guo Jianli | 250 | 331 | 286 | 584 | 1451 |
| | Han Jiahao | 230 | 343 | 290 | 551 | 1414 |
| | Su Haihang | 230 | 334 | 261 | 562 | 1387 |
| | Zhang Linbin | 190 | 316 | 293 | 560 | 1359 |
| 2nd place, silver medalist(s) | Japan (JPN) | 830 | 1294 | 1133 | 2246 | 5503 |
| | Shinya Fujii | 210 | 321 | 293 | 557 | 1381 |
| | Shohei Iwamoto | 225 | 316 | 297 | 585 | 1423 |
| | Tomoya Miguchi | 200 | 328 | 292 | 556 | 1376 |
| | Yuzuru Okubo | 195 | 329 | 251 | 548 | 1323 |
| 3rd place, bronze medalist(s) | South Korea (KOR) | 895 | 1341 | 839 | 2312 | 5387 |
| | Hwang Woo-jin | 220 | 339 | 278 | 569 | 1406 |
| | Jung Hwon-ho | 230 | 321 | 0 | 591 | 1142 |
| | Jung Jin-hwa | 225 | 339 | 293 | 586 | 1443 |
| | Lee Woo-jin | 220 | 342 | 268 | 566 | 1396 |
| 4 | Kazakhstan (KAZ) | 845 | 1265 | 799 | 2327 | 5236 |
| | Pavel Ilyashenko | 245 | 322 | 245 | 586 | 1398 |
| | Rustem Sabirkhuzin | 195 | 295 | 261 | 563 | 1314 |
| | Andrey Soldatov | 210 | 316 | 293 | 581 | 1400 |
| | Vladislav Sukharev | 195 | 332 | 0 | 597 | 1124 |
| 5 | Kyrgyzstan (KGZ) | 820 | 1173 | 832 | 2202 | 5027 |
| | Temirlan Aitimbetov | 240 | 307 | 295 | 558 | 1400 |
| | Daniiar Baktybekov | 190 | 301 | 258 | 561 | 1310 |
| | Nikita Kuznetsov | 205 | 293 | 0 | 527 | 1025 |
| | Tilek Talaibekov | 185 | 272 | 279 | 556 | 1292 |
