= Dmitriy Tyurin =

Kazakhstani modern pentathlete

Personal information
- Nationality: Kazakhstani
- Born: 1 October 1968 (age 57)

Sport
- Sport: Modern pentathlon
Medal record
Men's modern pentathlon
Representing Kazakhstan
Asian Games
Gold medal – first place	1994 Hiroshima	Team

Dmitriy Tyurin (Дмитрий Борисович Тюрин; born 1 October 1968) is a Kazakhstani modern pentathlete. He competed in the men's individual event at the 1996 Summer Olympics.
