= Olivier Clergeau =

French modern pentathlete

Personal information
- Born: 15 June 1969 (age 55)

Sport
- Country: France
- Sport: Modern pentathlon

Olivier Clergeau (born 15 June 1969) is a French modern pentathlete. He represented France at the 2000 Summer Olympics held in Sydney, Australia in the men's modern pentathlon and he finished in 8th place.
