= Heorhiy Chymerys =

Ukrainian modern pentathlete

Personal information
- Nationality: Ukrainian
- Born: 5 October 1972 (age 52)

Sport
- Sport: Modern pentathlon

Heorhiy Chymerys (born 5 October 1972) is a Ukrainian modern pentathlete. He competed at the 1996 Summer Olympics and the 2000 Summer Olympics.
