= Hiroshi Miyagahara =

Japanese modern pentathlete (born 1964)

Personal information
- Born: 29 August 1964 (age 61) Kagoshima Prefecture, Japan

Sport
- Sport: Modern pentathlon

Hiroshi Miyagahara (宮ヶ原 浩, Miyagahara Hiroshi; born 29 August 1964) is a Japanese modern pentathlete. He competed at the 1992 Summer Olympics.
