= Khalifa Hamad Khamis =

Bahraini fencer

Khalifa Khamis
Personal information
- Born: 21 April 1966 (age 60)

Sport
- Sport: Fencing

Khalifa Khamis (born 21 April 1966) is a Bahraini fencer. He competed in the team épée event at the 1988 Summer Olympics.
