= Alexander Parygin =

Kazakh-Australian modern pentathlete

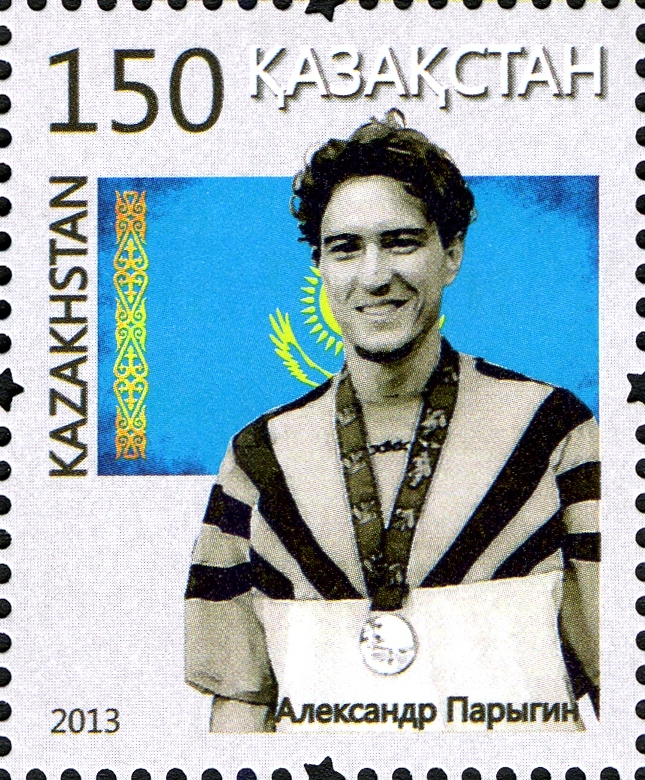
- Parygin depicted on a stamp from Kazakhstan

Personal information
- Born: 25 April 1973 (age 53) Almaty, Kazakh SSR, Soviet Union
- Height: 180 cm (5 ft 11 in)
- Weight: 75 kg (165 lb)

Sport
- Sport: Modern pentathlon
- Club: Modern Pentathlon Victoria
Medal record
Modern pentathlon
Representing Kazakhstan
Olympic Games
Gold medal – first place	1996 Atlanta	Individual
Asian Games
Gold medal – first place	1994 Hiroshima	Team
Silver medal – second place	1994 Hiroshima	Individual

Alexander Parygin (Russian: Александр Владимирович Парыгин, romanized: Aleksandr Vladimirovich Parygin, born 25 April 1973) is a Kazakh-Australian modern pentathlete and Olympic champion. He competed at the 1996 Summer Olympics in Atlanta where he won the individual gold medal.

He competed for Australia at the 2004 Summer Olympics in Athens and finished 27th overall. He initially qualified for the 2008 Summer Olympics in Beijing, but his qualification was called into question by the British team for failing to meet the minimum number of points required to be eligible (as his qualification took place at the Oceanian Championship in Tokyo, where the show jumping segment was called off after an outbreak of equine flu; however, the Australian Olympic Committee initially insisted he had met the requirements), and was eventually revoked by the Court of Arbitration for Sport (CAS). Alex now lives in Melbourne, Australia.
