= Guo Jianli =

Chinese modern pentathlete (born 1988)

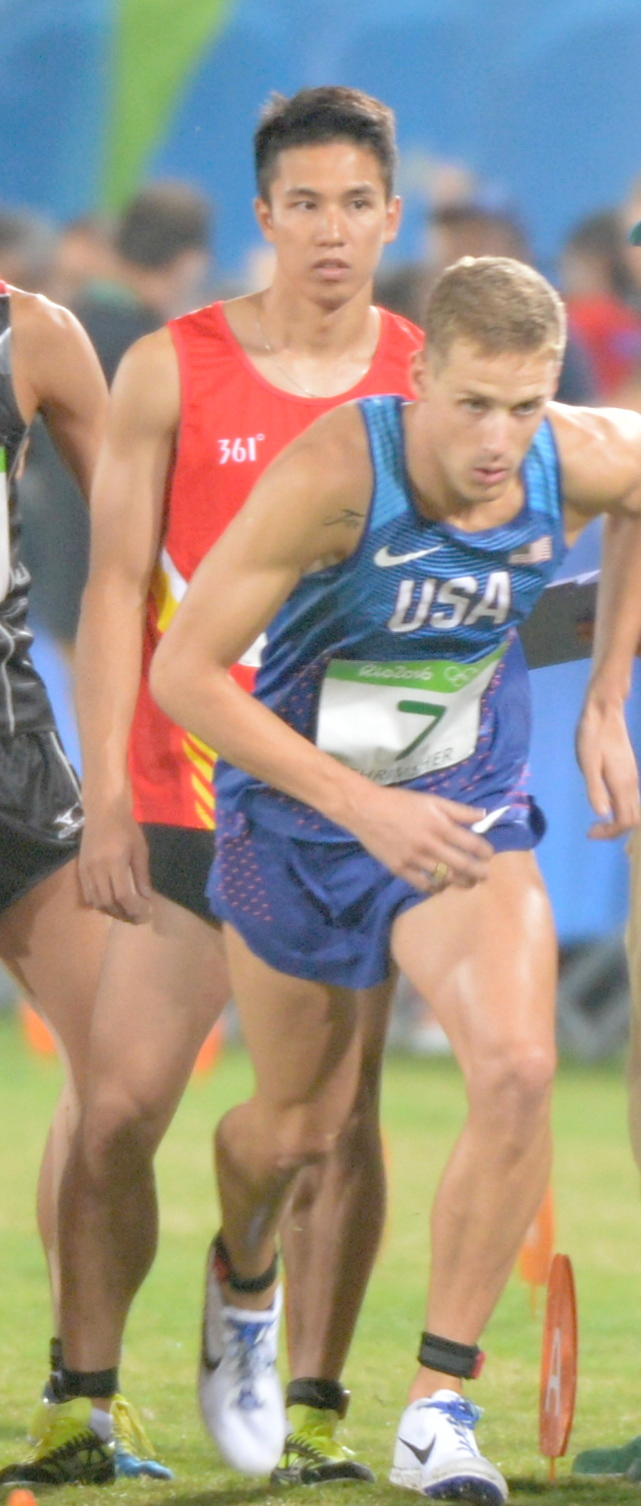
- Guo (left) at the 2016 Olympics

Personal information
- Born: 6 March 1988 (age 38)
- Height: 178 cm (5 ft 10 in)
- Weight: 73 kg (161 lb)

Sport
- Sport: Modern pentathlon
- Club: Guangdong Province
- Coached by: Shen Kejian
Medal record
Representing China
World championships
Silver medal – second place	2013 Kaoshiung	Relay
Bronze medal – third place	2014 Poland	Team
Asian Games
Gold medal – first place	2014 Incheon	Individual
Gold medal – first place	2014 Incheon	Team

Guo Jianli (born 6 March 1988) is a Chinese modern pentathlete who won individual and team gold medals at the 2014 Asian Games. He finished 11th at the 2016 Olympics.
