= Lee Choon-huan =

South Korean modern pentathlete

Lee Choon-Huan
Personal information
- Nationality: South Korea
- Born: 9 May 1980 (age 46)
- Height: 1.84 m (6 ft 1/2 in)
- Weight: 75 kg (165 lb)

Sport
- Sport: Modern pentathlon
- Club: Korea Armed Forces
Medal record
Men's modern pentathlon
Representing South Korea
Asian Games
Gold medal – first place	2010 Guangzhou	Team
Silver medal – second place	2010 Guangzhou	Individual
World Championships
Silver medal – second place	2004 Moscow	Individual
Silver medal – second place	2011 Moscow	Team
Bronze medal – third place	2004 Moscow	Relay

Lee Choon-Huan (Korean: 이춘헌; born May 9, 1980) is a two-time Olympic modern pentathlete from South Korea. He won a gold medal for the team relay, and an individual silver at the 2010 Asian Games in Guangzhou, China. Lee also led his team to win the silver medal at the 2011 World Modern Pentathlon Championships in Moscow, emerging him as one of South Korea's most prominent modern pentathletes in an international level.

Lee first competed at the 2004 Summer Olympics in Athens, Greece, where he finished in twenty-first place, with a score of 5,068 points. He continued to improve his performance at his second Olympics in Beijing, but a discontinuous riding segment affected and hampered his chances of reaching the top position in the men's event, as he finished abruptly in thirty-third place.
