= Jung Jin-hwa =

South Korean modern pentathlete

Jung Jin-Hwa
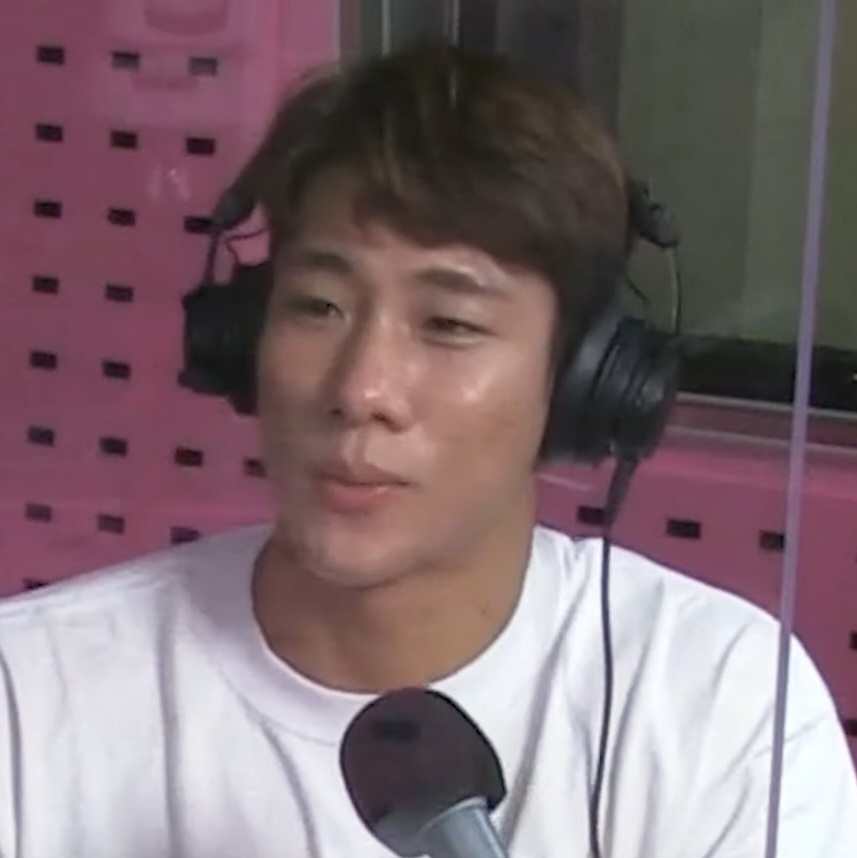

Personal information
- Nationality: South Korea
- Born: 25 May 1989 (age 37) Ulsan, South Korea
- Height: 1.82 m (5 ft 11 1/2 in)
- Weight: 74 kg (163 lb)

Sport
- Sport: Modern pentathlon
- Coached by: Nam Kyung-Guk
Medal record
Men's modern pentathlon
Representing South Korea
World Championships
Gold medal – first place	2012 Rome	Relay
Gold medal – first place	2015 Berlin	Team
Gold medal – first place	2016 Moscow	Relay
Gold medal – first place	2017 Cairo	Individual
Gold medal – first place	2019 Budapest	Team
Gold medal – first place	2022 Alexandria	Relay
Silver medal – second place	2019 Budapest	Relay
Silver medal – second place	2021 Cairo	Relay
Bronze medal – third place	2012 Rome	Individual
Bronze medal – third place	2012 Rome	Team
Bronze medal – third place	2013 Kaohsiung	Team
Bronze medal – third place	2016 Moscow	Individual
Bronze medal – third place	2016 Moscow	Team
Bronze medal – third place	2017 Cairo	Team
Bronze medal – third place	2023 Bath	Team
Asian Games
Gold medal – first place	2022 Hangzhou	Team
Silver medal – second place	2014 Incheon	Individual
Bronze medal – third place	2014 Incheon	Team

Jung Jin-Hwa (also Jeong Jin-Hwa, Korean: 정진화; born May 25, 1989, in Ulsan) is a modern pentathlete from South Korea. He competed at the 2012 Summer Olympics in London, where he finished eleventh in the men's event, tying for the best result for a South Korean with Kim Mi-Seop at Atlanta in 1996.

Jung also won an individual bronze medal at the 2012 World Modern Pentathlon Championships in Rome, Italy, finishing behind the Russians, world champion Aleksander Lesun and two-time Olympic champion Andrey Moiseev.

At the 2016 Olympics, he finished in 13th place.
