= Igor Feldman =

Kyrgyzstani modern pentathlete

Personal information
- Nationality: Kyrgyzstani
- Born: 28 April 1962 (age 63)

Sport
- Sport: Modern pentathlon

Igor Feldman (born 28 April 1962) is a Kyrgyzstani modern pentathlete. He competed in the men's individual event at the 1996 Summer Olympics.
