= Yoshihiro Murakami =

Japanese modern pentathlete

Personal information
- Nationality: Japan
- Born: 28 November 1976 (age 49) Shizuoka, Japan
- Height: 1.74 m (5 ft 8 1/2 in)
- Weight: 70 kg (154 lb)

Sport
- Sport: Modern pentathlon
- Club: Japan Self-Defense Forces
- Coached by: Tatsuya Kosai

Yoshihiro Murakami (村上 佳宏, Murakami Yoshihiro; born November 28, 1976, in Shizuoka) is a Japanese modern pentathlete. Murakami represented Japan at the 2008 Summer Olympics in Beijing, where he finished thirty-first in the men's event, with a score of 4,744 points.
