= Wang Guan =

Chinese modern pentathlete

Personal information
- Born: 16 February 1987 (age 39) Anshan, Liaoning, China

Sport
- Sport: Modern pentathlon

Wang Guan (王冠; born 16 February 1987) is a Chinese modern pentathlete. He competed at the 2012 Summer Olympics.
