= Liang Caixia =

Chinese modern pentathlete

Liang Caixia (Chinese: 梁彩霞; pinyin: Liáng Cǎixiá; Cantonese Yale: Leung4 Choi2 Ha4; born September 20, 1981, in Xinhui, Jiangmen, Guangdong) is a Chinese modern pentathlete who competed at the 2004 Summer Olympics.

She finished 29th in the women's competition.
