= Aleksandr Poddubny =

Kyrgyzstani fencer (born 1960)

Personal information
- Born: 24 June 1960 (age 66)

Sport
- Sport: Fencing

Aleksandr Poddubny (born 24 June 1960) is a Kyrgyz fencer. He competed in the individual épée event at the 1997 Tehran West Asian Games and 2000 Summer Olympics.
