= Hwang Woo-jin =

South Korean modern pentathlete

Personal information
- Nickname: Careless
- Nationality: South Korea
- Born: 8 May 1990 (age 36) Gwangju, South Korea
- Height: 1.81 m (5 ft 11 1/2 in)
- Weight: 64 kg (141 lb)

Sport
- Sport: Modern pentathlon
- Coached by: Nam Kyung-guk

Korean name
- Hangul: 황우진
- RR: Hwang Ujin
- MR: Hwang Ujin
Medal record
Men's modern pentathlon
Representing South Korea
World Championships
Gold medal – first place	2012 Rome	Relay
Gold medal – first place	2016 Moscow	Relay

Hwang Woo-jin (Korean: 황우진, also Hwang Wu-Jin, born May 8, 1990, in Gwangju) is a modern pentathlete from South Korea. He competed for the modern pentathlon at the 2012 Summer Olympics in London, along with his compatriot Jung Jin-hwa.

== "Careless" ==
Hwang merely called himself Careless, because he made numerous slight mistakes in his modern pentathlon career. He became one of the major highlights in the men's event at the 2012 Olympics, when his horse Shearwater Oscar threw him off the ground before he had even started his round in the riding segment. With the time already running and his left leg injured from the fall, Hwang set off the course, and managed to jump aboard, only for Shearwater Oscar to kick over the fence. Hwang finished with 464 obstacle and time penalties by a warm applause from the audience. Following his fair scores in fencing and swimming, and his disastrous and sudden fall in riding, Hwang placed thirty-fourth out of thirty-six competitors in the men's event.

Hwang also won two gold medals at the 2011 UIPM Junior World Championships in Buenos Aires, Argentina.
