= Shinichi Tomii =

Japanese modern pentathlete (born 1980)

Personal information
- Born: 1 September 1980 (age 45) Nagoya, Japan

Sport
- Sport: Modern pentathlon

Shinichi Tomii (富井 慎一, Tomii Shin'ichi; born 1 September 1980) is a Japanese modern pentathlete. He competed at the 2012 Summer Olympics.
