= Tomoya Miguchi =

Japanese modern pentathlete

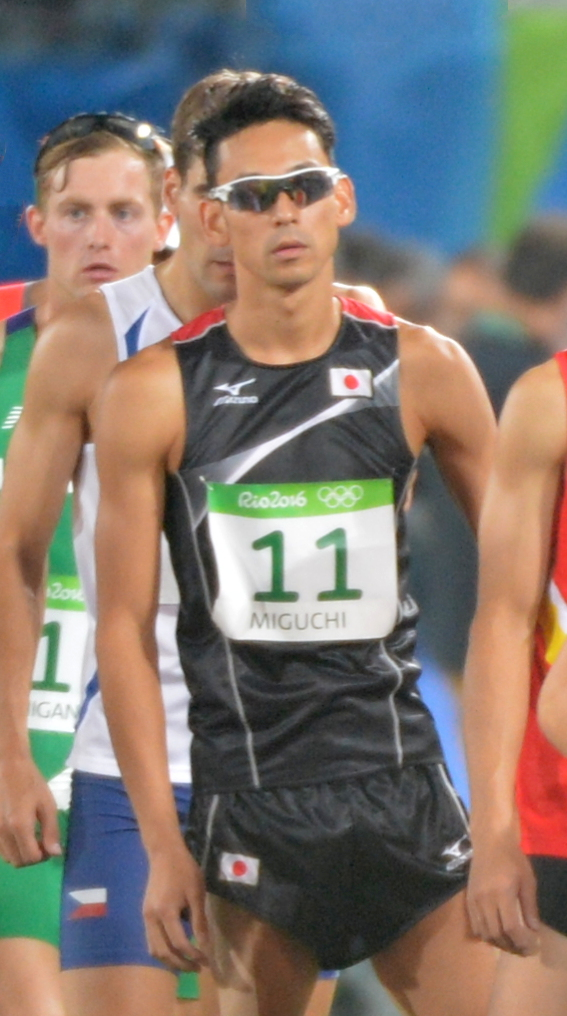
- Miguchi at the 2016 Olympics

Personal information
- Native name: 三口智也
- Nationality: Japanese
- Born: April 26, 1986 (age 40)
- Height: 180 cm (5 ft 11 in)
- Weight: 67 kg (148 lb)

Sport
- Sport: Modern pentathlon
- Club: JSDF Physical Training School
- Coached by: Hiroshi Miyagahara
Medal record
Representing Japan
Asian Games
Bronze medal – third place	2010 Guangzhou	Team
Silver medal – second place	2014 Incheon	Team

Tomoya Miguchi (三口智也, Miguchi Tomoya; born April 26, 1986) is a Japanese modern pentathlete who won two team medals at the 2010 and 2014 Asian Games. He finished 22nd at the 2016 Olympics.

Miguchi started as a swimmer and competed for the national junior team. He changed to pentathlon in 2006, and in 2010 received the Japan Sports Award.
