= Dong Le'an =

Chinese modern pentathlete (born 1982)

Dong Le'an (simplified Chinese: 董乐安; traditional Chinese: 董樂安; pinyin: Dǒng Lèān; born January 28, 1982, in Hunan) is a female Chinese modern pentathlete who competed at the 2004 Summer Olympics.

She finished 24th in the women's competition.
