= Galina Dolgushina =

Kazakhstani modern pentathlete

Personal information
- Nationality: Kazakhstan
- Born: 28 March 1981 (age 45) Alma-Ata, Kazakh SSR, Soviet Union
- Height: 1.68 m (5 ft 6 in)
- Weight: 58 kg (128 lb)

Sport
- Sport: Modern pentathlon
- Club: Dinamo Almaty
- Coached by: Nikolay Vassilyev
Medal record
Women's modern pentathlon
Representing Kazakhstan
Asian Games
Bronze medal – third place	2010 Guangzhou	Team

Galina Dolgushina (Kazakh: Галина Долгушина; born March 28, 1981, in Alma-Ata) is a Kazakhstani modern pentathlete. As of 2011, she is ranked no. 194 in the world by the Union Internationale de Pentathlon Moderne (UIPM).

Dolgushina qualified for the 2008 Summer Olympics in Beijing, where she competed in the women's modern pentathlon, along with her teammate Lada Jienbalanova. During the competition, Dolgushina struggled to attain a higher position in the early rounds, with slightly fair scores in pistol shooting, and freestyle swimming. She quickly moved to the top of the rankings, when she finished third in a one-touch épée fencing, and thirteenth in show jumping. In the end, Dolgushina finished the event with cross-country running in twenty-sixth place, for a total score of 5,216 points.

At the 2010 Asian Games in Guangzhou, China, Dolgushina became one of the major highlights in the women's modern pentathlon, when a nine-year-old retired racehorse died from a neck injury following a spill that left her hospitalized. Dolgushina appeared to be having a difficulty handling the horse, which failed to jump twice over the course barrier and repeatedly knocked off other obstacles. She almost completed the course of the show jumping segment, until she was suddenly thrown forward and pinned by the horse's body. Dolgushina was immediately taken by an ambulance to nearby hospital, where her condition was later upgraded to stable.
