= Lyudmila Shumilova =

Kazakhstani modern pentathlete

Lyudmila Shumilova (born August 2, 1969) is a Kazakhstani modern pentathlete. She placed 30th in the women's individual event at the 2004 Summer Olympics.
