= Han Do-ryung =

South Korean modern pentathlete

Personal information
- Nationality: South Korean
- Born: 25 November 1976 (age 48)

Sport
- Sport: Modern pentathlon

Han Do-ryung (born 25 November 1976) is a South Korean modern pentathlete. He competed in the men's individual event at the 2004 Summer Olympics.
