= Pavel Uvarov (pentathlete) =

Kyrgyzstani modern pentathlete

Personal information
- Nationality: Kyrgyzstani
- Born: 9 February 1971 (age 54); Kara-Balta, Kyrgyzstan

Sport
- Sport: Modern pentathlon

Pavel Uvarov (born 9 February 1971) is a Kyrgyzstani former modern pentathlete. He competed in the men's individual event at the 2004 Summer Olympics.
