= Qian Zhenhua =

Chinese modern pentathlete

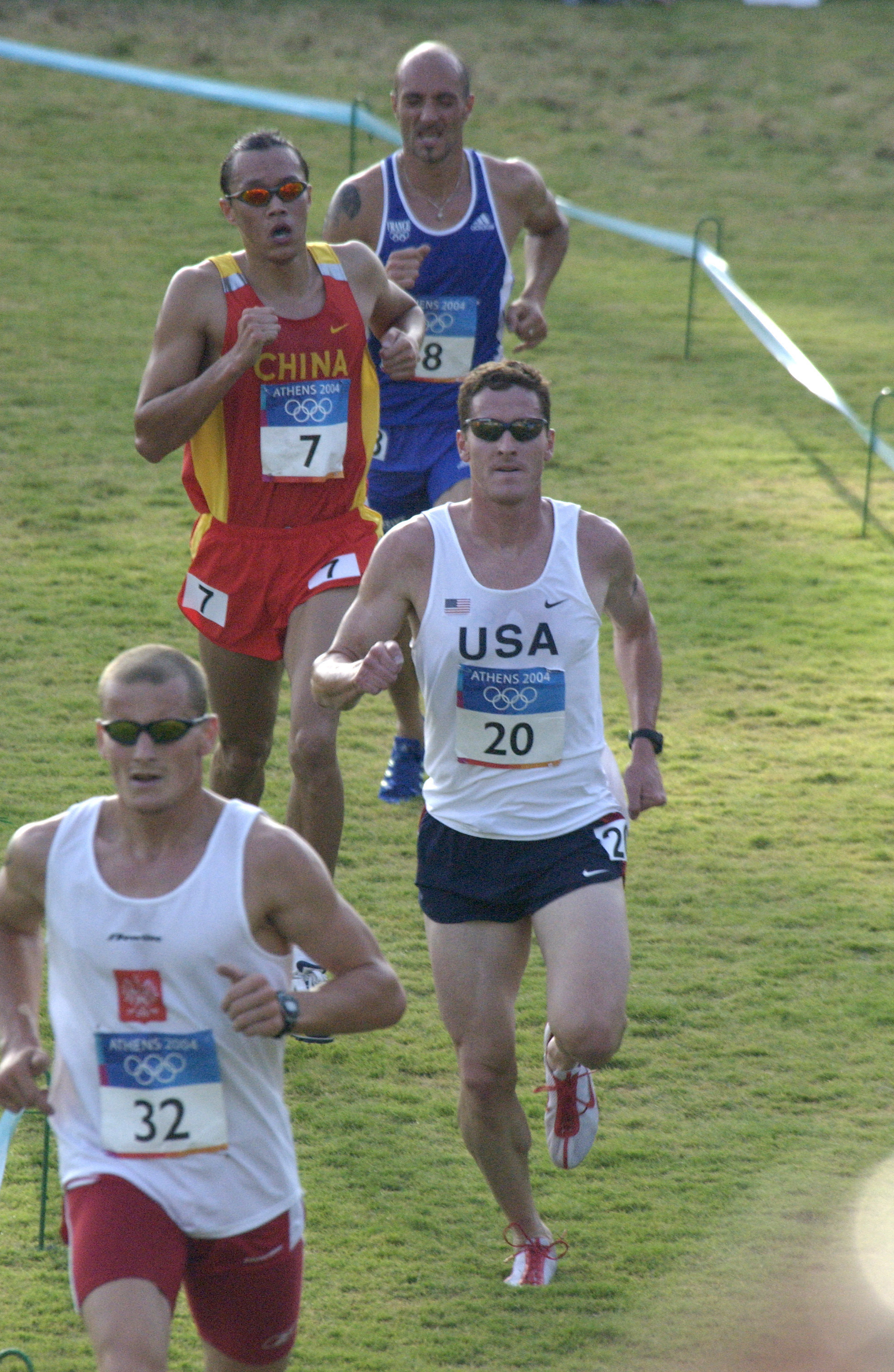
- Qian Zhenhua (no. 7) during the men's pentathlon at the 2004 Summer Olympics

Medal record

Men's modern pentathlon

Representing China

World Championships
Gold medal – first place	2005 Warsaw	Individual
Silver medal – second place	2007 Berlin	Relay
Bronze medal – third place	2006 Guatemala City	Relay

Qian Zhenhua (simplified Chinese: 钱震华; traditional Chinese: 錢震華; pinyin: Qián Zhènhuá; born September 1, 1979, in Shanghai) is a male Chinese modern pentathlete who competed in the 2000 Summer Olympics, in the 2004 Summer Olympics and also in the 2008 Summer Olympics.

In 2000, he finished 24th in the men's competition.

Four years later, he finished 16th in the men's competition.

He won the gold medal of the individual event at the 2005 World Modern Pentathlon Championships.

He made great improvement and finished 4th in the men's competition at the 2008 Summer Olympics.
