= Lada Jiyenbalanova =

Kazakhstani modern pentathlete

Lada Jienbalanova
Personal information
- Full name: Lada Vladimirovna Jienbalanova
- Nationality: Kazakhstan
- Born: 10 April 1970 (age 56)
- Height: 1.66 m (5 ft 5 1/2 in)
- Weight: 54 kg (119 lb)

Sport
- Sport: Modern pentathlon
Medal record
Women's modern pentathlon
Representing Kazakhstan
Asian Games
Gold medal – first place	2002 Busan	Individual
Bronze medal – third place	2010 Guangzhou	Team

Lada Vladimirovna Jienbalanova (Russian: Лада Владимировна Джиенбаланова; born April 10, 1970) is a female modern pentathlete from Kazakhstan. She competed at the 2004 Summer Olympics in Athens, Greece, where she finished fourteenth in the women's event with a score of 5,076 points. At the 2008 Summer Olympics, Jienbalanova fell off her horse during the riding segment, and decided not to run in the 3 km-cross country race, finishing only in last place.

In 2002, Jienbalanova achieved her best results in the modern pentathlon by winning gold medals at the Asian Championships in Tokyo, Japan, and at the Asian Games in Busan, South Korea. She also led her national team to obtain the bronze medal at the 2010 Asian Games in Guangzhou, China.
