= Kim Mi-sub =

South Korean modern pentathlete (1972–2025)

Personal information
- Nationality: South Korean
- Born: 24 December 1972 Suncheon, South Korea
- Died: 15 December 2025 (aged 52) Carrollton, Texas, U.S.

Sport
- Sport: Modern pentathlon

Kim Mi-sub (24 December 1972 – 15 December 2025) was a South Korean modern pentathlete. He competed in the men's individual event at the 1996 Summer Olympics.

Kim died on 15 December 2025 in Carrollton, Texas, at the age of 52.
